= List of county roads in Isanti County, Minnesota =

- Standard county road markers

Highway names
- Interstates: Interstate X (I-X)
- US Highways: U.S. Highway X (US X)
- State: Trunk Highway X (MN X or TH X)
- County State-Aid Highways: County State-Aid Highway X (CSAH X)
- County Roads: County Road X (CR X)

System links
- County roads of Minnesota; Isanti County

The following is an incomplete list of county-maintained roads in Isanti County, Minnesota, United States.

== CR 1–CR 30 ==

County Road 1 is a county route serving Bradford Township, Springvale Township, Walbo and Maple Ridge Township. The southern leg of this route begins at its intersection with 325th Avenue Northwest / State Highway 47 (MN 47), located 1 mile (1.6 km) east of West Point, heads 1.25 miles (2.01 km) east on 325th Avenue Northwest, heads northwest on Heather Street Northwest and Walbo Drive, east on 333rd Avenue Northwest, and terminates 1 mile (1.6 km) southeast of Walbo at State Highway 95 (MN 95). The northern leg of the route begins in Walbo, at its intersection with Highway 95, heads north 6.5 miles (10.5 km) on Vernon Street Northwest, and terminates at its intersection with 389th Avenue Northwest (CR 3). Originally not segmented, the portion of the southern leg along 333rd Avenue Northwest was designated as County Road 65, but when the bridge over the Rum River was decommissioned, CR 1 was segmented and re-routed, making use of the Rum River bridge servicing Highway 95.

County Road 2 is a county route serving Cambridge Township. It begins 1 mile (1.6 km) east of Cambridge at its intersection with State Highway 95 (MN 95), heads northeast along Stark Road Northeast and terminates at the county line. The road continues eastward as Stark Road West (Chisago CR 10).

County Road 3 is a county route serving Dalbo Township, Maple Ridge Township, Elm Park, Stanchfield Township and Stanchfield. It begins 0.5 miles (0.80 km) east of Dalbo at its intersection with State Highway 47 (MN 47), heads east 0.5 miles (0.80 km) along 381st Avenue Northwest, heads north 0.5 miles (0.80 km) along Jivaro Street, heads east 1.5 miles (2.4 km) along 385th Avenue Northwest, heads north 0.5 miles (0.80 km) along Lily Street Northwest, then heads east 10 miles (16 km), terminating at the county line. The road continues eastward as 500th Street (Chisago CR 6). Inter-county G maintains concurrency along the entire CR 3.

County Road 4 is a county route serving Dalbo Township, Day, Maple Ridge Township, Stanchfield Township, Andree and Braham. It begins 1.6 miles (2.6 km) west of Day at its intersection with State Highway 47 (MN 47), heads northeast 0.6 miles (0.97 km) on Day Road, continues east 2.5 miles (4.0 km) on 409th Avenue West through Day, heads north 0.5 miles (0.80 km) on Lily Street Northwest, heads east 3.5 miles (5.6 km) on 413th Avenue Northwest, heads north 0.5 miles (0.80 km) on Holly Street Northwest, heads east and northeast approximately 2.5 miles (4.0 km) through Andree on 417th Avenue Northwest and Andree Road, heads southeast concurrently for 0.2 miles (0.32 km) with State Highway 65 (MN 65) and heads northeast 0.2 miles (0.32 km) to the county line on Rice Lake Road Northeast. Once on the county line, the road heads east, first 1 mile (1.6 km) as 421st Avenue Northeast (Kanabec CR 4), then 0.2 miles (0.32 km) as 421st Avenue Northeast (Isanti CR 4), and then 1.1 miles (1.8 km) through Braham as 6th Avenue Northwest (Isanti CR 4). County Road 4 heads south on Main Street for 1.2 miles (1.9 km), concurrently with State Highway 107 (MN 107), then heads east 1.6 miles (2.6 km) to the county line on 8th Street Southeast, which becomes 413th Avenue Northeast upon leaving Braham. The road continues eastward as North Lake Drive (Chisago CR 2).

County Road 5 is a county route serving Spencer Brook Township, Oxlip, Bradford Township, Isanti, Isanti Township, Blomford and North Branch Township. The 28 miles (45 km) route begins as a continuation of 140th Street (Sherburne CR 2), heads east on 313th Avenue Northwest, heads south on Dolphin Street, then east on 293rd Avenue Northwest, where for the rest of the route maintains concurrency with Inter-county H. The route briefly heads south on Palm Street Northwest (CR 10), heads east on 289th Avenue Northwest through Isanti, and continues east on 293rd Avenue Northeast to the county line. The route continues eastward as Isanti Trail (Chisago CR 13).

County Road 6 is a county route serving Wyanett Township, Springvale Township, Springvale, Cambridge Township and Grandy. The 21.5 miles (34.6 km) route begins as a continuation of 60th Street (Mille Lacs CR 13) at its intersection with Jarvis Street Northwest (Isanti CR 13), generally heads east, briefly heads north concurrently with State Highway 47 (MN 47), continues to head east through Springvale and Grandy, briefly heads south concurrently with State Highway 65 (MN 65), then continues to head east to the county line. The route continues eastward as Rush Point Drive (Chisago CR 7).

County Road 7 is a county route serving Stanford Township, Crown, Spencer Brook Township, Spencer Brook and Wyanett Township. Roughly paralleling State Highway 47 (MN 47), the 15 miles (24 km) route begins as a continuation of Nacre Street Northwest (Anoka CR 28), heads north to 261st Avenue Northwest (CR 8), briefly heads west into Crown, then generally heads north through Spencer Brook to its terminus at the intersection of Helium Street Northwest (CR 7 / CR 57) and State Highway 95 (MN 95). The road continues north as Helium Street Northwest (CR 57) and eventually as Highway 47.

County Road 8 is a county route serving Stanford Township and Crown. The 21.5 miles (34.6 km) route begins as a continuation of 260th Avenue (Sherburne CR 4), heads east on 261st Avenue Northwest, and terminates at its intersection with Verdin Street Northwest (CR 10).

County Road 9 is a county route serving Athens Township, Athens, and Oxford Township. The 10.7 miles (17.2 km) route begins at its intersection with State Highway 65 (MN 65), heads generally east on 269th Avenue Northeast and 267th Avenue Northeast, and terminates at the county line. the road continues eastward as Athens Trail (Chisago CR 17).

County Road 10 is a county route serving Athens Township, Stanford Township, Bradford Township and Springvale Township.

County Road 11 is a county route serving Spencer Brook Township and Wyanett Township.

County Road 12 is a county route serving Athens Township, Oxford Township, Weber, Isanti Township and North Branch Township.

County Road 13 is a county route serving Princeton Township and Bogus Brook Township in Mille Lacs County,

Wyanett Township and Dalbo Township in Isanti County.

County Road 14 is a county route serving Cambridge, Cambridge Township, Springvale Township and Maple Ridge Township.

County Road 15 is a county route serving Wyanett Township and Dalbo Township.

County Road 16 is a county route starting at (Mille Lacs CR 10) serving Dalbo Township.

County Road 17 is a county route serving Bradford Township.

County Road 18 is a county route serving Oxford Township and North Branch Township.

County Road 19 is a county route serving Cambridge, Isanti Township and Bodum.

County Road 19A is a short route located in Isanti Township. It begins at the intersection of 311th Avenue Northeast (CR 19) and Durant Street Northeast, heads north 1 mile (1.6 km) on Durant Street Northeast, heads east 0.5 miles (0.80 km) on 317th Avenue Northeast, heads north 1 mile (1.6 km) through Stanley on Lever Street Northeast and terminates at its intersection with State Highway 95 (MN 95).

County Road 23 is a 8 miles (13 km) route serving Athens Township and Isanti. It begins at the intersection of Verdin Street Northwest (CR 69) with 249th Avenue Northwest (CR 10 / CR 23) and heads east 1.5 miles (2.4 km), heads 1.5 miles (2.4 km) north on Xeon Street Northwest, heads 1.5 miles (2.4 km) east on 261st Avenue Northwest, heads 2.25 miles (3.62 km) north on University Avenue, generally heads north and east on Whiskey Road Northwest, and terminates at its intersection with County Road 5 in Isanti.

County Road 24 is a 3.5 miles (5.6 km) route serving Stanchfield Township. It begins at the intersection of 389th Avenue Northeast (CR 3) with Polk Street Northeast, heads north on Polk Street Northeast, and terminates at 417th Avenue Northeast (CR 4).

County Road 27 is a short route located in Cambridge. It begins at the intersection of 1st Avenue East / State Highway 95 (MN 95) and Emerson Street, heads north on Emerson Street, then briefly heads west and terminates at Main Street (CR 30). Originally, the county road began at the intersection of Main Street and 3rd Avenue Southwest, headed east on 3rd Avenue Southwest, headed north to Buchanan Street, headed concurrently east on 1st Avenue East with Highway 95, before continuing northward along the present routing; this longer routing was shortened to the current shorter routing upon completion and re-routing of the State Highway 65 (MN 65) expressway through Cambridge. County Road 27 is unsigned.

County Road 28 is a 2.5 miles (4.0 km) route serving Spencer Brook Township. The highway is a continuation of 289th Avenue (Sherburne CR 28) as it becomes 289th Avenue Northwest (Isanti CR 28) and heads east and north on Tiger Road Northwest, 291st Avenue Northwest and Bison Road Northwest, terminating at its intersection with 293rd Avenue Northwest (CR 5). Inter-County H runs concurrently on CR 28.

County Road 30 is a short route serving Cambridge and Cambridge Township. The route begins when Emerson Street (CR 27) intersects with Main Street, heads north on Main Street for approximately 1.3 miles (2.1 km), and terminates at its intersection with State Highway 65 (MN 65). When the Highway 65 expressway through Cambridge was completed, the former routing of Highway 65 along Main Street was designated as CR 30. The route was shortened to just the northern portion on Main Street in 2004, but a sign indicating this former routing is still seen along east-bound 1st Street / State Highway 95 (MN 95) as it approaches Main Street. The highway was marked with a white square shield until 2010 and was re-marked with the blue pentagon shield, but is still indicated along MN 65 with the white square shield as MN 65 approaches the northern terminus of county road.

== CR 31–CR 72 ==

County Road 36 is a county route serving Cambridge Township, Stanchfield Township, Stanchfield and Braham. The southern segment, signed as County Road 36A, begins at its intersection with State Highway 95 (MN 95), heads north on Vickers Street Northeast, heads west on 333rd Avenue Northeast, and terminates at its intersection with MN 95. The central segment, signed as County Road 36, begins at its intersection with Stark Road (CR 2), heads north and northeast 3.85 miles (6.20 km) on Vickers Street Northeast, heads concurrently east on 267th Avenue Northeast (CR 6), heads north and west 3 miles (4.8 km) on Lever Street Northeast and terminates at its intersection with 389th Avenue Northeast (CR 3). The northern segment, also signed as County Road 36, begins at its intersection with 389th Avenue Northeast (CR 3), 1.25 miles (2.01 km) west of the northern terminus of the central segment, heads northeast, paralleling the rail line, on Stanchfield Road Northeast and Naples Street Northeast, heads east 0.5 miles (0.80 km) on 395th Avenue Northeast, heads north 2.25 miles (3.62 km) on Vickers Street Northeast, and terminates at its intersection with 8th Street Southeast (CR 4).

County Road 69 is a 0.5 miles (0.80 km) road serving Athens Township. It begins at the county line, heads north on Verdin Street Northwest, and terminates at 249th Avenue Northwest (CR 10 / CR 23).

County Road 70 is a 6.4 miles (10.3 km) road serving Bradford Township, Isanti Township, Cambridge Township and Cambridge. It begins at County Road 5, heads north 2 miles (3.2 km) on Holly Street Northwest, heads east 0.5 miles (0.80 km) on 305th Avenue Northwest, heads north 1 mile (1.6 km) on University Avenue, generally heads north and northeast on Jackson Road, and terminates at 1st Avenue West / State Highway 95 (MN 95).

County Road 71 is a 4.5 miles (7.2 km) road serving Stanford Township. It begins at the county line as a continuation of Seelye Brook Drive (Anoka CR 71), heads north 2 miles (3.2 km) on Helium Street Northwest, heads east 0.5 miles (0.80 km) concurrently on 261st Avenue Northwest (CR 8), heads generally north 2 miles (3.2 km) on Zuni Street Northwest, and terminates at German Lake Road Northwest (CR 59).

County Road 72 is a 2.5 miles (4.0 km) road serving Maple Ridge Township. It begins at its intersection with 397th Avenue Northwest (CR 63), heads north 1 mile (1.6 km) on Dahlia Street Northwest, heads east 0.5 miles (0.80 km) on 405th Avenue Northwest, heads north 1 mile (1.6 km) on Verdin Street Northwest, and terminates at its intersection with 413th Avenue Northwest (CR 4).

== Inter-county ==

Presumably as Mille Lacs County Road 13 becomes Isanti County Road 13 heading east, Inter-county Highway G begins when 381st Street Northwest (CR 13) becomes 381st Street Northwest (CR 3). Inter-county G maintains concurrency on County Road 3. The Inter-county designation terminates at the intersection with MN 65.

=== Former Inter-county ===

Inter-county Highway H began at the southwestern edge of Isanti County as 289th Avenue (Sherburne County Road 28) becomes 289th Avenue Northwest (CR 28) and runs concurrently east on County Road 28. When County Road 28 terminates at County Road 5, Inter-county Highway H continued its concurrency east on County Road 5. While County Road 5 continues on Isanti Trail (Chisago County Road 13), the Inter-county designation terminated at the termination of County Road 5.
