= Stanchfield =

Stanchfield may refer to:

== Places in the United States ==
- Stanchfield, Minnesota, a census-designated place
- Stanchfield Corner, Minnesota, an unincorporated community
- Stanchfield Creek, a creek in Minnesota
- Stanchfield Lake, a lake in Minnesota
- Stanchfield Township, Isanti County, Minnesota

== People with the surname ==
- Daniel Stanchfield (1820–1908), American businessman, politician, and explorer
- Darby Stanchfield (born 1971), American actress
- John B. Stanchfield (1855–1921), American lawyer and politician
- Samuel B. Stanchfield (1837–1919), American politician
- Walt Stanchfield (1919-2000), American animator, teacher, and writer
