= Blomford, Minnesota =

Unincorporated community in Minnesota, United States

Blomford
- Unincorporated community
- Location within Minnesota Location within the United States
- Coordinates: 45°30′01″N 93°08′33″W
- Country: United States
- State: Minnesota
- County: Isanti County
- Township: North Branch Township and Isanti Township
- Elevation: 945 ft (288 m)
- Time zone: UTC-6 (Central (CST))
  - Summer (DST): UTC-5 (CDT)
- ZIP code: 55008 and 55040
- Area code: 763
- GNIS feature ID: 640266

Blomford is an unincorporated community in Isanti County, Minnesota, United States.

The community is located between Isanti and North Branch at the junction of Isanti County Roads 5 and 12.

Blomford is located within Isanti Township and North Branch Township. Nearby places also include Cambridge and Weber.

== Transportation ==
- Isanti County Road 5
- Isanti County Road 12
