= Oxlip, Minnesota =

Unincorporated community in Minnesota, United States

Oxlip
- Unincorporated community
- Location within Minnesota Location within the United States
- Coordinates: 45°30′01″N 93°23′20″W
- Country: United States
- State: Minnesota
- County: Isanti
- Township: Spencer Brook Township and Bradford Township
- Elevation: 958 ft (292 m)
- Time zone: UTC-6 (Central (CST))
  - Summer (DST): UTC-5 (CDT)
- ZIP code: 55040
- Area code: 763
- GNIS feature ID: 654867

Oxlip is an unincorporated community in Isanti County, Minnesota, United States. It is within Spencer Brook Township and Bradford Township.

Oxlilp is at the junction of Isanti County Road 5 and Roanoke Street NW. State Highway 47 (MN 47) is nearby. Oxlip is west of Isanti and near Bradford.
