= West Point, Minnesota =

Unincorporated community in Minnesota, United States

West Point
- Unincorporated community
- Location within Minnesota Location within the United States
- Coordinates: 45°33′28″N 93°23′21″W
- Country: United States
- State: Minnesota
- County: Isanti
- Elevation: 945 ft (288 m)
- Time zone: UTC-6 (Central (CST))
  - Summer (DST): UTC-5 (CDT)
- ZIP code: 55008 and 55371
- Area code: 763
- GNIS feature ID: 655005

West Point is an unincorporated community in Isanti County, Minnesota, United States.

The community is located at the junction of State Highway 47 (MN 47) and Roanoke Street NW. The Rum River flows through the community.

West Point is located at the survey point boundary line for:

- Wyanett Township
- Springvale Township
- Bradford Township
- Spencer Brook Township
