= Crown, Minnesota =

Unincorporated community in Minnesota, United States

Crown
- Unincorporated community
- Location within Minnesota Location within the United States
- Coordinates: 45°26′41″N 93°27′37″W
- Country: United States
- State: Minnesota
- County: Isanti
- Township: Stanford Township
- Elevation: 961 ft (293 m)
- Time zone: UTC-6 (Central (CST))
  - Summer (DST): UTC-5 (CDT)
- Area code: 763
- GNIS feature ID: 642513

Crown is an unincorporated community in Stanford Township, Isanti County, Minnesota, United States. The community is located north of St. Francis.

Isanti County Roads 7 and 8 are two of the main routes in the community. State Highway 47 (MN 47) and U.S. Highway 169 are nearby.

== History ==
Crown was founded in the late 19th century by primarily German immigrants as a farming community. Among the first residents in the area were families with the surnames of Grams, Whittlef (also spelled Wittlief and Wittlef), Stoeckel, Lemke, Hartfiel, and Hass. Frederick Wilhelm Grams (December 4, 1859 - May 5, 1918) was born in Friedentau, Germany. He immigrated to the USA and was one of the founders of Crown, Minnesota.

Crown had a creamery, three stores with bars, a blacksmith shop, a garage repair shop, and a German Lutheran Church and a Lutheran School. The Lemke family owned the community store from 1905 to 2005, when it was sold and renamed "Crown Gas and Goodies".

In 2008, a fire destroyed the County Line Bar and Grill, formerly Hierlinger’s general store, and the Farmers Cooperative Mercantile Company of West Stanford it reopened January 2013 at the same location. Crown now largely consists of the store, a bar, and Zion Lutheran Church and School one mile north of Crown.

== Infrastructure ==
=== Transportation ===
- United States Highway 169
- Minnesota State Highway 47
- Isanti County Road 8
- Isanti County Road 7
