= Spencer Brook =

Spencer Brook may refer to:

- Spencer Brook (New York), a river in Delaware County, New York
- Spencer Brook (Minnesota), a stream in Isanti County, Minnesota
- Spencer Brook Township, Isanti County, Minnesota
- Spencer Brook, Minnesota, an unincorporated community in Spencer Brook Township
