= Grandy, Minnesota =

Unincorporated community in Minnesota, United States

Grandy
- Unincorporated community
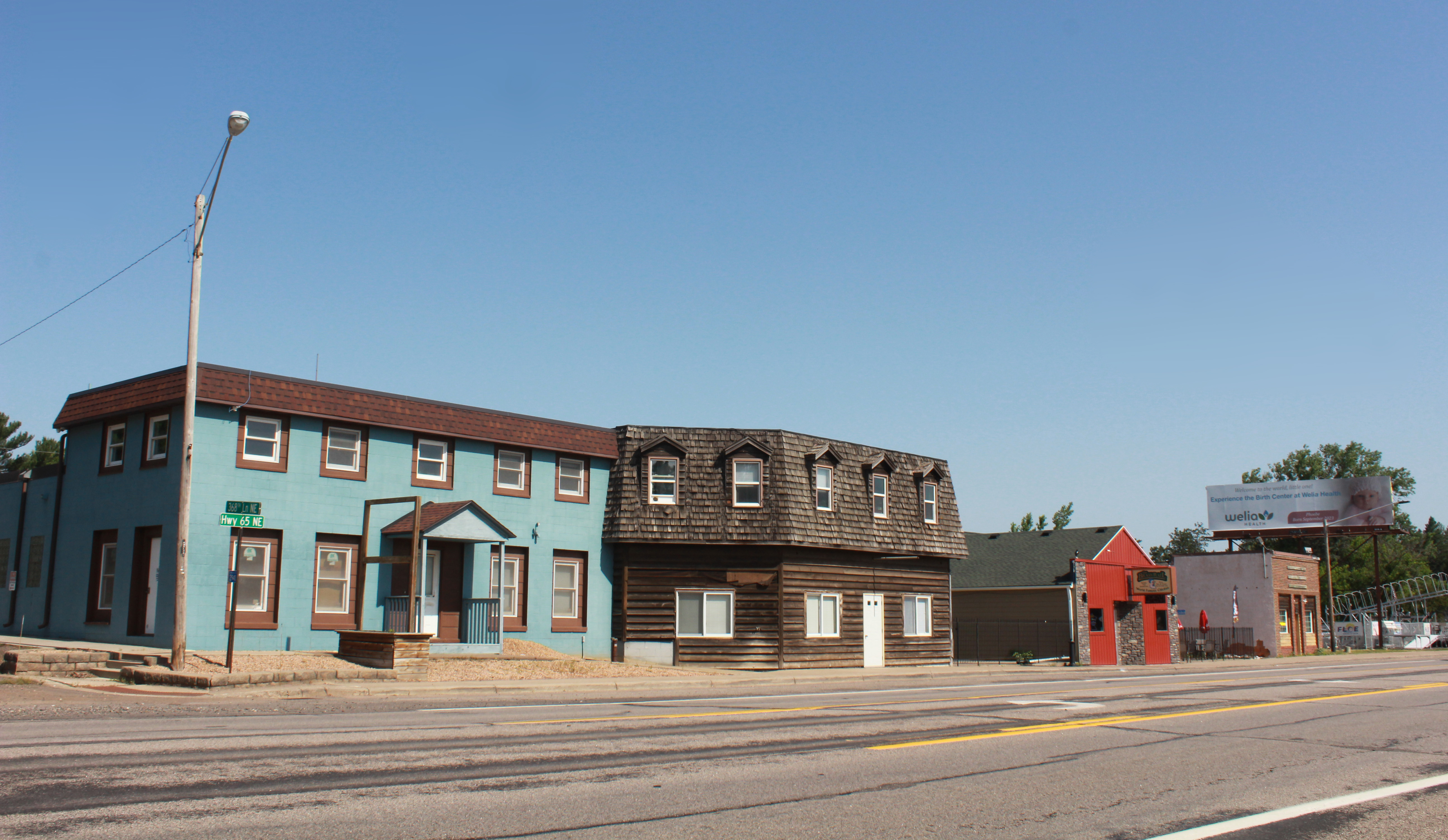
- Residences and businesses on Hwy MN-65

- Location within Minnesota Location within the United States
- Coordinates: 45°38′07″N 93°11′43″W
- Country: United States
- State: Minnesota
- County: Isanti
- Township: Cambridge Township
- Elevation: 938 ft (286 m)
- Time zone: UTC-6 (Central (CST))
  - Summer (DST): UTC-5 (CDT)
- ZIP code: 55029 and 55080
- Area code: 763
- GNIS feature ID: 644344

Grandy is an unincorporated community in Cambridge Township, Isanti County, Minnesota, United States.

Grandy is located north of the city of Cambridge at the junction of State Highway 65 (MN 65) and Isanti County Road 6.

Stanchfield and Braham are nearby. ZIP codes 55029 (Grandy), 55008 (Cambridge), and 55080 (Stanchfield) all meet near Grandy.

A post office called Grandy has been in operation since 1899. Grandy was a station on the Great Northern Railroad.

== Infrastructure ==
=== Transportation ===
- MN 65
- Isanti County Road 6
