= Wyanett, Minnesota =

Unincorporated community in Minnesota, United States

Wyanett
- Unincorporated community
- Location within Minnesota Location within the United States
- Coordinates: 45°35′13″N 93°27′03″W
- Country: United States
- State: Minnesota
- County: Isanti
- Township: Wyanett Township
- Elevation: 971 ft (296 m)
- Time zone: UTC-6 (Central (CST))
  - Summer (DST): UTC-5 (CDT)
- ZIP code: 55371
- Area code: 763
- GNIS feature ID: 655023

Wyanett is an unincorporated community in Wyanett Township, Isanti County, Minnesota, United States.

The community is located between Cambridge and Princeton at the junction of State Highway 95 (MN 95) and Nacre Street NW.
