= Weber, Minnesota =

Unincorporated community in Minnesota, United States

Weber
- Unincorporated community
- Location within Minnesota Location within the United States
- Coordinates: 45°28′30″N 93°07′27″W
- Country: United States
- State: Minnesota
- County: Isanti
- Township: Oxford Township and North Branch Township
- Elevation: 932 ft (284 m)
- Time zone: UTC-6 (Central (CST))
  - Summer (DST): UTC-5 (CDT)
- ZIP code: 55056
- Area code: 763
- GNIS feature ID: 655000

Weber is an unincorporated community in Isanti County, Minnesota, United States.

The community is located at the junction of Isanti County Road 12 (Jodrell Street NE) and Isanti County Road 47 (279th Avenue NE).

Weber is located within Oxford Township and North Branch Township. The North Branch of the Sunrise River flows from west to east, a quarter mile north of Weber. Nearby places include North Branch, Stacy, Isanti, and Cambridge.

Local business establishments include Jumpin Jacks Bar. Formerly it was the site of the Weber Store. St. John's Lutheran Church (LCMS) is located about 1500 feet north of the junction of 12 and 47.
