= Bradford, Minnesota =

Unincorporated community in Minnesota, United States

Bradford
- Unincorporated community
- Location within Minnesota Location within the United States
- Coordinates: 45°31′21″N 93°22′08″W
- Country: United States
- State: Minnesota
- County: Isanti
- Township: Bradford Township
- Elevation: 938 ft (286 m)
- Time zone: UTC-6 (Central (CST))
  - Summer (DST): UTC-5 (CDT)
- ZIP code: 55008, 55040
- Area code: 763
- GNIS feature ID: 640415

Bradford is an unincorporated community in Bradford Township, Isanti County, Minnesota, United States.

The community is located west of Cambridge and Isanti and north of St. Francis on State Highway 47 (MN 47). The center of Bradford is generally considered at the junction of Highway 47 and Isanti County Road 40. Other routes include County Roads 5, 10, and 17.

Bradford currently has a gas station, a used car lot, a few small industries, which include, but are not limited to, Heat Mizer Glass, and has a restaurant "Bradford Roadhouse" on the site of the former Bradford Store.

== Infrastructure ==
=== Transportation ===
- Minnesota State Highway 47
- Isanti County Road 40
- Isanti County Road 5
- Isanti County Road 17
- Isanti County Road 10
