= List of modern cities named after Athens =

This List of modern cities named after Athens recounts modern city names entirely named after Athens, Greece, or containing Athens as a segment.

United States

- Athens, Alabama (pop. 30,904)
- Athens, Arkansas
- Athens, California
- West Athens, California (pop. 9,101)
- Athens, Georgia (pop. 114,983)
- Athens, Illinois (pop. 1,726)
- New Athens, Illinois (pop. 2,620)
- New Athens Township, St. Clair County, Illinois (pop. 2,620)
- Athens, Indiana
- Athens, Kentucky
- Athens, Louisiana (pop. 262)
- Athens Township, Jewell County, Kansas (pop. 74)
- Athens, Maine (pop. 847)
- Athens, Michigan (pop. 1,111)
- Athens Township, Michigan (pop. 2,571)
- Athens, Minnesota
- Athens Township, Minnesota (pop. 2,322)
- Athens, Mississippi
- Athens (town), New York (pop. 3,991)
- Athens (village), New York (pop. 1,695)
- Athens, Ohio (pop. 21,909)
- Athens County, Ohio (pop. 62,223)
- Athens Township, Athens County, Ohio (pop. 27,714)
- Athens Township, Harrison County, Ohio (pop. 520)
- New Athens, Ohio (pop. 342)
- Athena, Oregon (pop. 1,270)
- Athens, Pennsylvania (pop. 3,415)
- Athens Township, Bradford County, Pennsylvania (pop. 5,058)
- Athens Township, Crawford County, Pennsylvania (pop. 775)
- Athens, Tennessee (pop. 13,220)
- Athens, Texas (pop. 11,297)
- Athens, Vermont (pop. 340)
- Athens, West Virginia (pop. 1,102)
- Athens, Wisconsin (pop. 1,095)

Canada

- Athens Township, Ontario (pop. 3,086)

Costa Rica

- Atenas (pop. 7,716)
- Atenas (canton) (pop. 23,743)

Germany

- Athenstedt, Saxony-Anhalt (pop. 431)

Honduras

- Atenas De San Cristóbal, Atlántida

Italy

- Atena Lucana, Province of Salerno, Campania (pop. 2,344)
- Atina, Province of Frosinone, Lazio (pop. 4,480)

Poland

- Ateny, Podlaskie Voivodeship (pop. 40)

Ukraine

- Afini (Zoria – Зоря), Donetsk (pop. 200)
