= Edgewood, Minnesota =

Unincorporated community in Minnesota, United States

Edgewood
- Unincorporated community
- Location within Minnesota Location within the United States
- Coordinates: 45°32′11″N 93°13′51″W
- Country: United States
- State: Minnesota
- County: Isanti County
- Township: Isanti Township
- Elevation: 961 ft (293 m)
- Time zone: UTC-6 (Central (CST))
  - Summer (DST): UTC-5 (CDT)
- ZIP code: 55008
- Area code: 763
- GNIS feature ID: 643172

Edgewood is an unincorporated community in Isanti Township, Isanti County, Minnesota, United States.

The community is located between the cities of Cambridge and Isanti at the junction of State Highway 65 (MN 65) and old Highway 65. Davenport Street is one of the main routes in the community. Florence Lake is nearby to the east. Local business establishments include a gas station. Edgewood's motto is Little pine in the middle.

== Infrastructure ==
=== Transportation ===
- MN 65
