= Athens, Minnesota =

Unincorporated community in Minnesota, United States

Athens
- Unincorporated community
- Location within Minnesota Location within the United States
- Coordinates: 45°26′35″N 93°14′55″W
- Country: United States
- State: Minnesota
- County: Isanti
- Township: Athens Township
- Elevation: 925 ft (282 m)
- Time zone: UTC-6 (Central (CST))
  - Summer (DST): UTC-5 (CDT)
- ZIP code: 55040
- Area code: 763
- GNIS feature ID: 663470

Athens is an unincorporated community in Athens Township, Isanti County, Minnesota, United States.

Main routes include Isanti CR 9 (269th Avenue NE), Isanti CR 56 (261st Avenue NE), and MN 65.

Nearby places include Isanti, East Bethel, Stacy, and Athens Wildlife Management Area.

The Cedar Creek Ecosystem Reserve, operated by the University of Minnesota, is also nearby.

== Infrastructure ==
=== Transportation ===
- MN 65
- Isanti CR 9
- Isanti CR 56
