= Walbo, Minnesota =

Unincorporated community in Minnesota, United States

Walbo
- Unincorporated community
- Location within Minnesota Location within the United States
- Coordinates: 45°35′14″N 93°19′37″W
- Country: United States
- State: Minnesota
- County: Isanti
- Township: Springvale Township
- Elevation: 945 ft (288 m)
- Time zone: UTC-6 (Central (CST))
  - Summer (DST): UTC-5 (CDT)
- ZIP code: 55008
- Area code: 763
- GNIS feature ID: 654991

Walbo is an unincorporated community in Springvale Township, Isanti County, Minnesota, United States.

The community is located at the junction of State Highway 95 (MN 95) and Isanti County Road 1. Walbo is located west of Cambridge.

The Rum River flows through the community. Nearby places also include Bradford, Pine Brook, and Springvale County Park.
