= Andree, Minnesota =

Unincorporated community in Minnesota, United States

Andree
- Unincorporated community
- Location within Minnesota Location within the United States
- Coordinates: 45°43′42″N 93°13′26″W
- Country: United States
- State: Minnesota
- County: Isanti
- Township: Stanchfield Township

Government
- Elevation: 958 ft (292 m)
- Time zone: UTC-6 (Central (CST))
  - Summer (DST): UTC-5 (CDT)
- ZIP code: 55073
- Area code: 320
- GNIS feature ID: 654569

Andree is an unincorporated community in Stanchfield Township, Isanti County, Minnesota, United States.

Isanti County Road 4 and State Highway 65 (MN 65) are two of the main routes in the community.

Nearby places include Braham, Stanchfield, Coin, Brunswick, and Rice Creek Wildlife Management Area.

== Infrastructure ==
=== Transportation ===
- Minnesota State Highway 65
- Isanti County Road 4
