= Spring Lake, Isanti County, Minnesota =

Unincorporated community in Minnesota, United States

Spring Lake
- Unincorporated community
- Location within Minnesota Location within the United States
- Coordinates: 45°32′32″N 93°03′57″W
- Country: United States
- State: Minnesota
- County: Isanti
- Township: North Branch Township
- Elevation: 948 ft (289 m)

Population
  - Total: 70
- Time zone: UTC-6 (Central (CST))
  - Summer (DST): UTC-5 (CDT)
- Area code: 651
- GNIS feature ID: 652476

Spring Lake is an unincorporated community in North Branch Township, Isanti County, Minnesota, United States.

The community is located 4.5 miles (7.2 km) northwest of the city of North Branch at the junction of State Highway 95 (MN 95) and Isanti County Road 21 (Cedar Crest Trail). Spring Lake Road NE also serves the community.

Spring Lake is 8 miles (13 km) east of Cambridge, Minnesota.
