= Springvale, Minnesota =

Unincorporated community in Minnesota, United States

Springvale
- Unincorporated community
- Location within Minnesota Location within the United States
- Coordinates: 45°37′50″N 93°18′25″W
- Country: United States
- State: Minnesota
- County: Isanti
- Township: Springvale Township
- Elevation: 938 ft (286 m)
- Time zone: UTC-6 (Central (CST))
  - Summer (DST): UTC-5 (CDT)
- ZIP code: 55008
- Area code: 763
- GNIS feature ID: 654956

Springvale is an unincorporated community in Springvale Township, Isanti County, Minnesota, United States.

The community is located at the junction of Isanti County Road 6 and Flamingo Street NW. County Roads 1 and 14 are nearby. Stanchfield Creek flows through the community. Springvale is located northwest of Cambridge.
