= Stanchfield Creek =

Stream in Isanti County, Minnesota, U.S.

Coordinates: 45.6024630°N 93.2893939°W

Stanchfield Creek is a stream in Isanti County, in the U.S. state of Minnesota.

== History ==
Stanchfield Creek was named for Daniel Stanchfield, an explorer of the area and afterward state politician.

== See also ==
- List of rivers of Minnesota
