= Stanley, Minnesota =

Unincorporated community in Minnesota, United States

Stanley
- Unincorporated community
- Location within Minnesota Location within the United States
- Coordinates: 45°33′02″N 93°09′10″W
- Country: United States
- State: Minnesota
- County: Isanti County
- Township: Isanti Township
- Elevation: 981 ft (299 m)
- Time zone: UTC-6 (Central (CST))
  - Summer (DST): UTC-5 (CDT)
- ZIP code: 55008
- Area code: 763
- GNIS feature ID: 654960

Stanley is an unincorporated community in Isanti Township, Isanti County, Minnesota, United States.

Stanley is located east of Cambridge at the junction of Lever Street NE and 321st Avenue NE.

Nearby is Lake Fannie, also spelled Lake Fanny.

Isanti County Roads 12 and 19, and State Highway 95 (MN 95) are also nearby.
