= Trollin Lake =

Lake in the state of Minnesota, United States

- Location within Minnesota
- Location: Isanti County, Minnesota
- Coordinates: 45°40′10″N 93°9′50″W
- Type: lake

Trollin Lake is a lake in Isanti County, in the U.S. state of Minnesota.

Trollin Lake was named for a pioneer blacksmith who settled there.

== See also ==
- List of lakes in Minnesota
