= Stanchfield Corner, Minnesota =

Unincorporated community in Minnesota, United States

Stanchfield Corner
- Unincorporated community
- Location within Minnesota Location within the United States
- Coordinates: 45°40′25″N 93°11′35″W
- Country: United States
- State: Minnesota
- County: Isanti
- Elevation: 942 ft (287 m)
- Time zone: UTC-6 (Central (CST))
  - Summer (DST): UTC-5 (CDT)
- Area code: 763
- GNIS feature ID: 654959

Stanchfield Corner is an unincorporated community in Stanchfield Township, Isanti County, Minnesota, United States.
