= Day, Minnesota =

Unincorporated community in Minnesota, United States

Day
- Unincorporated community
- Location within Minnesota Location within the United States
- Coordinates: 45°42′33″N 93°22′46″W
- Country: United States
- State: Minnesota
- County: Isanti
- Township: Maple Ridge Township
- Elevation: 1,033 ft (315 m)
- Time zone: UTC-6 (Central (CST))
  - Summer (DST): UTC-5 (CDT)
- ZIP code: 55006
- Area code: 320
- GNIS feature ID: 642660

Day is an unincorporated community in Maple Ridge Township, Isanti County, Minnesota, United States.

Isanti County Roads 4 and 22 are two of the main routes in the community. Nearby places include Dalbo, Coin, Braham, Lewis Lake, and Cranberry Wildlife Management Area. State Highway 47 (MN 47) is nearby.

== Infrastructure ==
=== Transportation ===
- Isanti County Road 4
- Isanti County Road 22
