= Elm Park, Minnesota =

Unincorporated community in Minnesota, United States

Elm Park
- Unincorporated community
- Location within Minnesota Location within the United States
- Coordinates: 45°40′23″N 93°16′34″W
- Country: United States
- State: Minnesota
- County: Isanti
- Township: Maple Ridge Township
- Elevation: 961 ft (293 m)
- Time zone: UTC-6 (Central (CST))
  - Summer (DST): UTC-5 (CDT)
- ZIP code: 55080
- Area codes: 320 and 763
- GNIS feature ID: 654691

Elm Park is an unincorporated community in Maple Ridge Township, Isanti County, Minnesota, United States.

Isanti County Roads 3 and 14 are two of the main routes in the community.
