= Spencer Brook (Minnesota) =

Stream in Isanti County, Minnesota, U.S.

Coordinates: 45°31′44″N 93°26′22″W

Spencer Brook is a stream in Isanti County, in the U.S. state of Minnesota.

Spencer Brook was named for Judge Benjamin Nicholson Spencer (1806–1881) from Pennsylvania, an early settler.
