= Bodum, Minnesota =

Ghost town in Isanti Township, Minnesota, US

Coordinates: 45°31′18″N 93°12′16″W

Bodum is a ghost town in section 16 of Isanti Township, in Isanti County, Minnesota.

== History ==
Bodum had a post office from 1899 until 1903, as well as a store, a creamery, and an ice house. Bodum was not on a railroad line or major road, and never developed beyond a farm community. Today, the only trace of the town that remains is the old store that is currently being used as a house.
