= Stanchfield Lake =

Lake in the state of Minnesota, United States

- Location within Minnesota
- Location: Morrison County, Minnesota
- Coordinates: 46°16′6″N 94°32′27″W
- Type: lake

Stanchfield Lake is a lake in Morrison County, in the U.S. state of Minnesota.

Stanchfield Lake bears the name of a local lumberman.

== See also ==
- List of lakes in Minnesota
