= Stanchfield, Minnesota =

Unincorporated community in Minnesota, US

Stanchfield
- Census-designated place
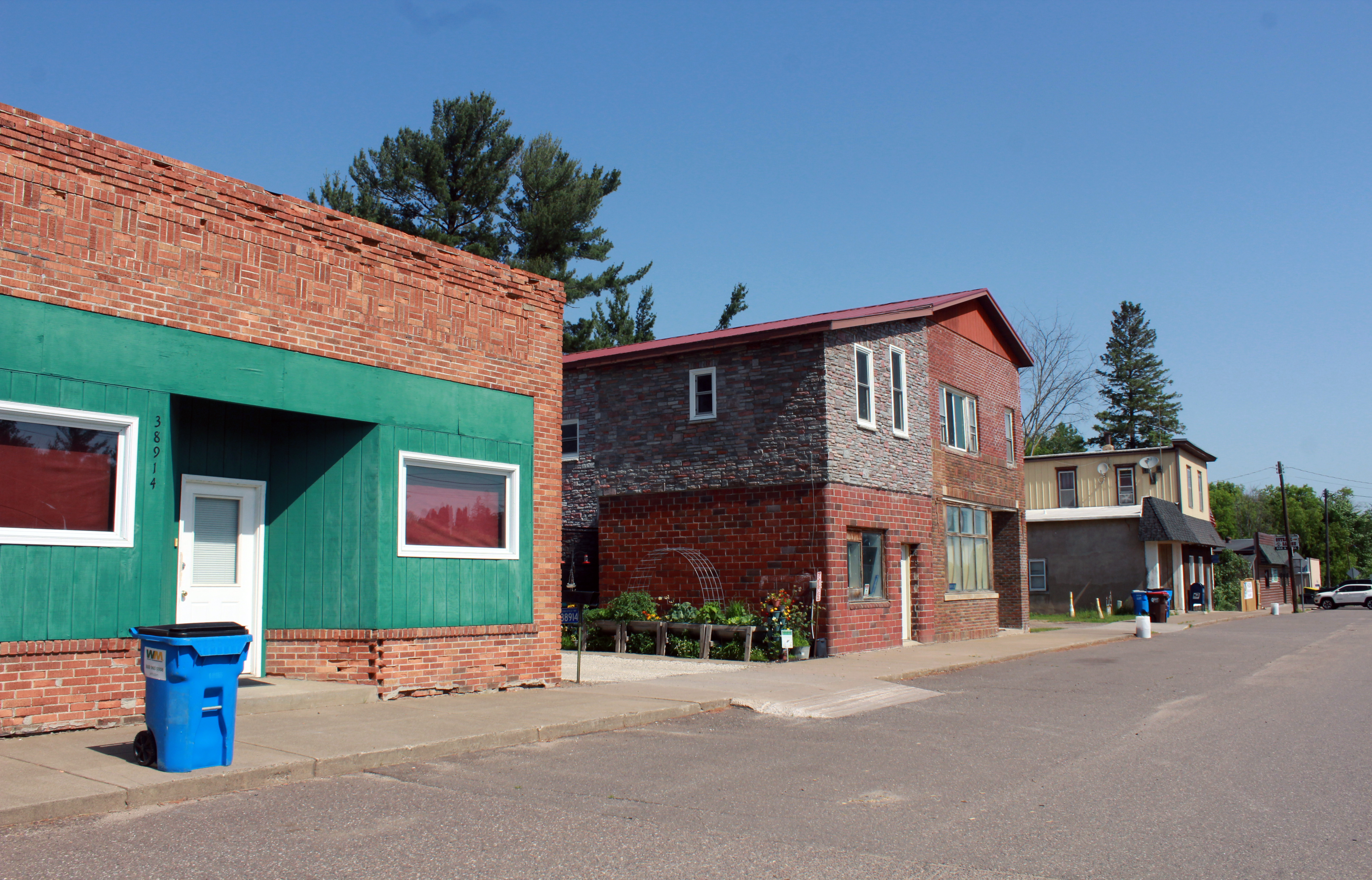
- Buildings on Stanchfield Road NE

- Location within Minnesota Location within the United States
- Coordinates: 45°40′24″N 93°11′00″W
- Country: United States
- State: Minnesota
- County: Isanti
- Township: Stanchfield

Area
  - Total: 0.74 sq mi (1.91 km^{2})
  - Land: 0.74 sq mi (1.91 km^{2})
  - Water: 0 sq mi (0.00 km^{2})
- Elevation: 942 ft (287 m)

Population (2020)
  - Total: 103
  - Density: 139.8/sq mi (53.99/km^{2})
- Time zone: UTC-6 (Central (CST))
  - Summer (DST): UTC-5 (CDT)
- Area code: 763
- GNIS feature ID: 652540

Stanchfield is an unincorporated community and census-designated place (CDP) in Stanchfield Township, Isanti County, Minnesota, United States. As of the 2020 census, its population was 103.

Isanti County Roads 3 and 36 and State Highway 65 (MN 65) are three of the main routes in the community. The community is between Cambridge and Braham. Grandy is nearby.

Trollin and Section lakes are nearby.

== Notable person ==
Wendell Erickson (1925-2018), educator and Minnesota state legislator, was born in Stanchfield.

== Demographics ==
Historical population
Census	Pop.	Note	%±
2010	118		—
2020	103		−12.7%
U.S. Decennial Census

=== 2010 census ===
As of the census of 2010, there were 118 people, 42 households, and 33 families in the CDP. The population density was 222.2 inhabitants per square mile (85.8/km^{2}). There were 46 housing units at an average density of 86.6 per square mile (33.4/km^{2}). The racial makeup of the CDP was 99.2% White, and 0.8% Asian.

There were 42 households, of which 42.9% had children under the age of 18 living with them, 57.1% were married couples living together, 9.5% had a female householder with no husband present, 11.9% had a male householder with no wife present, and 21.4% were non-families. 11.9% of all households were made up of individuals, and 4.8% had someone living alone who was 65 years of age or older. The average household size was 2.81 and the average family size was 3.06.

The median age in the CDP was 30.5 years. 31.4% of residents were under the age of 18; 5.1% were between the ages of 18 and 24; 29.7% were from 25 to 44; 25.4% were from 45 to 64; and 8.5% were 65 years of age or older. The gender makeup of the CDP was 53.4% male and 46.6% female.

== Gallery ==
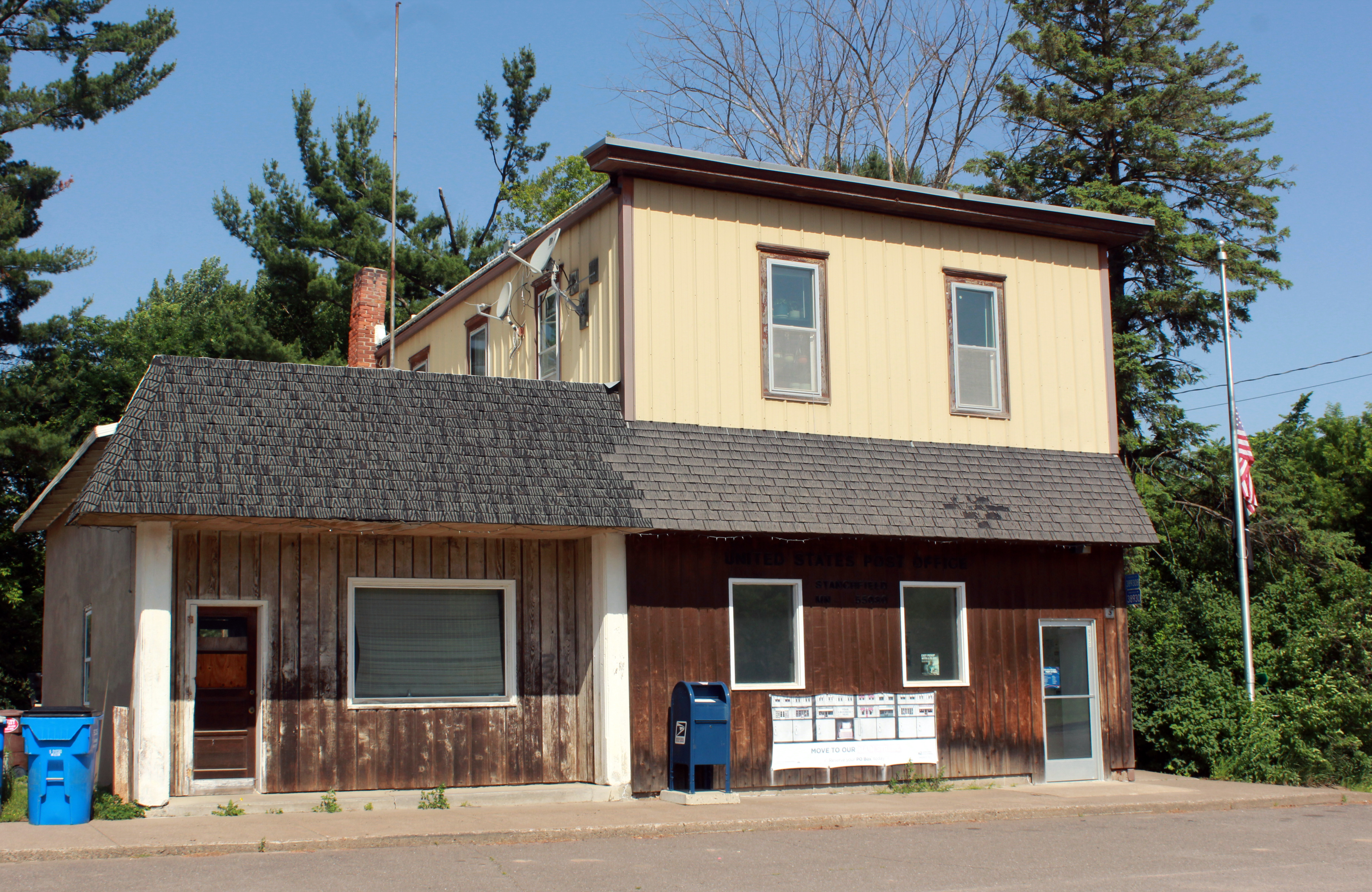
Post Office

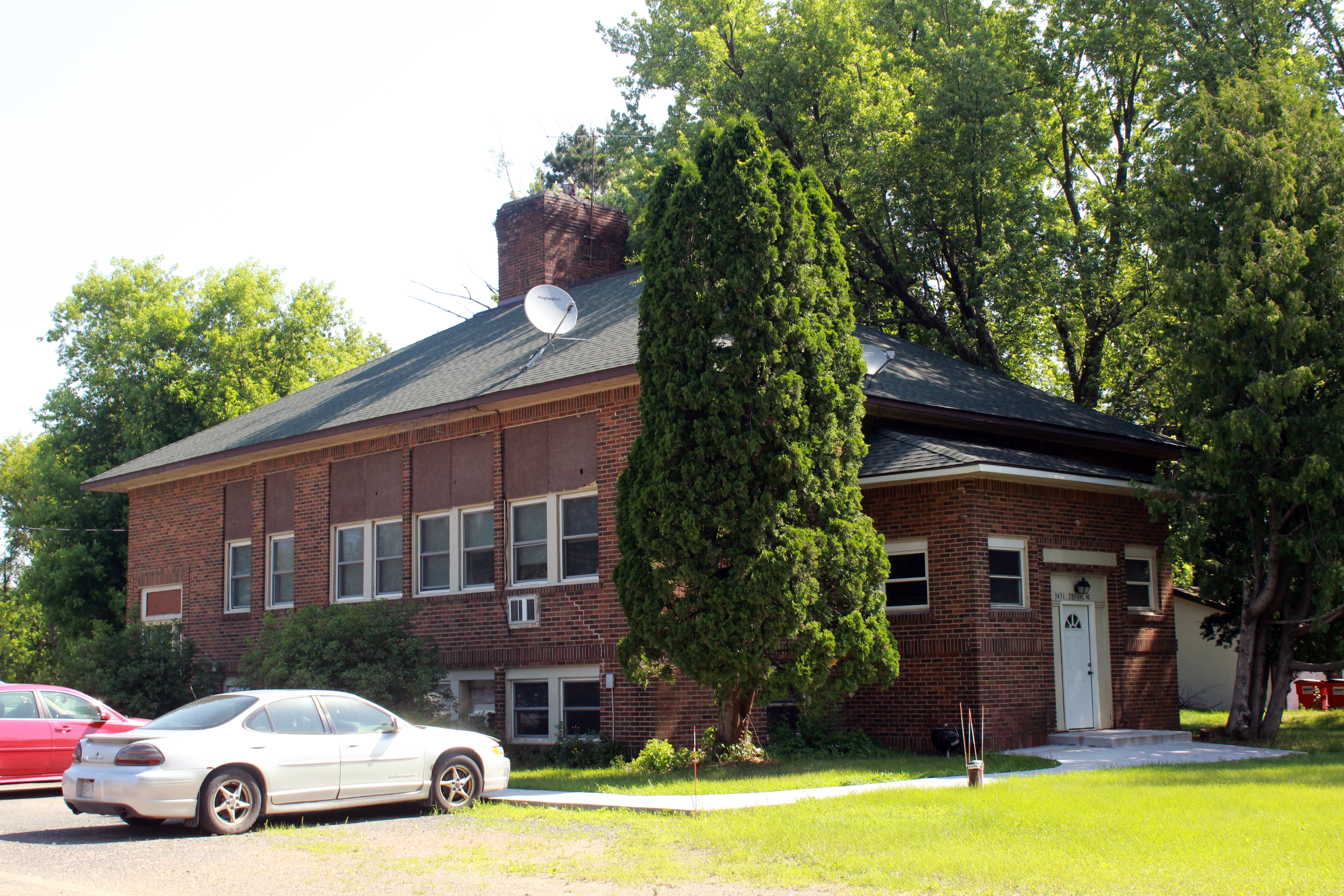
Former school building

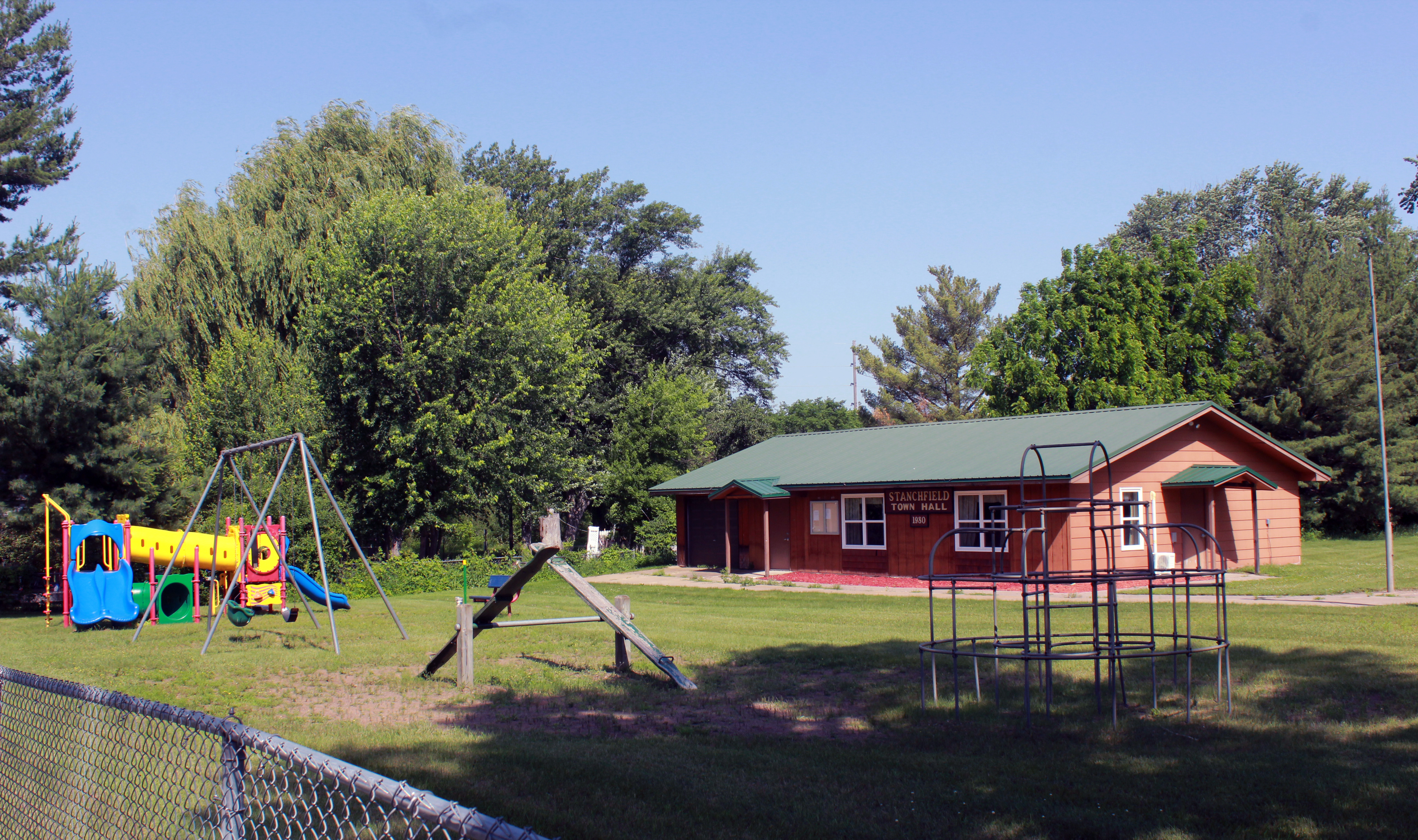
Town hall and playground
