= Cambridge Township, Isanti County, Minnesota =

Township in Minnesota, United States

Cambridge Township
- Township
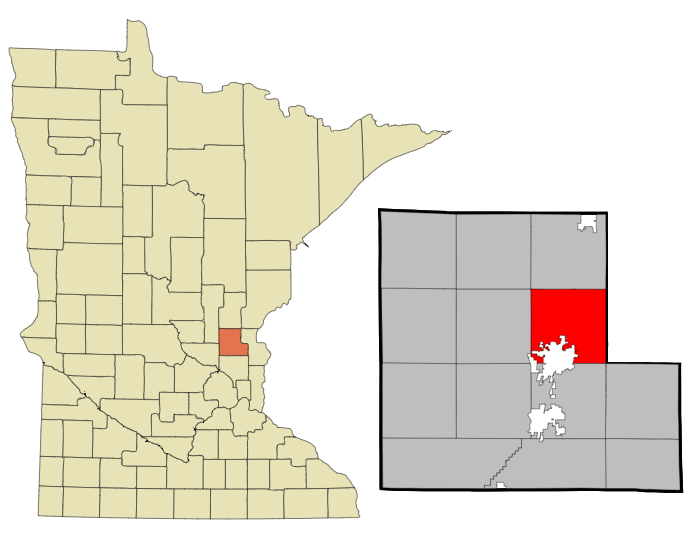
- Location of the township of Cambridge within Isanti County, Minnesota
- Coordinates: 45°35′47″N 93°11′50″W
- Country: United States
- State: Minnesota
- County: Isanti

Area
  - Total: 32.0 sq mi (82.9 km^{2})
  - Land: 30.7 sq mi (79.4 km^{2})
  - Water: 1.4 sq mi (3.5 km^{2})
- Elevation: 942 ft (287 m)

Population (2000)
  - Total: 2,413
  - Density: 79/sq mi (30.4/km^{2})
- Time zone: UTC-6 (Central (CST))
  - Summer (DST): UTC-5 (CDT)
- ZIP code: 55008
- Area code: 763
- FIPS code: 27-09388
- GNIS feature ID: 0663730
- Website: http://www.cambridgetownship.us/

Cambridge Township is a township in Isanti County, Minnesota, United States. The population was 2,413 at the 2000 census.

Cambridge Township was named after Cambridge, Maine, the native home of a share of the early settlers.

== Geography ==
According to the United States Census Bureau, the township has a total area of 32.0 square miles (83 km^{2}), of which 30.6 square miles (79 km^{2}) is land and 1.4 square miles (3.6 km^{2}) (4.25%) is water.

== Demographics ==
Historical population
Census	Pop.	Note	%±
1870	374		—
1880	698		86.6%
1890	926		32.7%
1900	1,295		39.8%
1910	1,130		−12.7%
1920	1,145		1.3%
1930	1,407		22.9%
1940	2,285		62.4%
1950	2,076		−9.1%
1960	2,167		4.4%
1970	2,174		0.3%
1980	2,300		5.8%
1990	1,988		−13.6%
2000	2,413		21.4%
2010	2,379		−1.4%
U.S. Decennial Census

As of the census of 2000, there were 2,413 people, 833 households, and 676 families residing in the township. The population density was 78.7 inhabitants per square mile (30.4/km^{2}). There were 893 housing units at an average density of 29.1 per square mile (11.2/km^{2}). The racial makeup of the township was 97.47% White, 0.21% African American, 0.29% Native American, 0.41% Asian, 0.08% Pacific Islander, 0.21% from other races, and 1.33% from two or more races. Hispanic or Latino of any race were 0.87% of the population.

There were 833 households, out of which 39.7% had children under the age of 18 living with them, 71.9% were married couples living together, 6.1% had a female householder with no husband present, and 18.8% were non-families. 13.6% of all households were made up of individuals, and 4.7% had someone living alone who was 65 years of age or older. The average household size was 2.89 and the average family size was 3.18.

In the township the population was spread out, with 29.3% under the age of 18, 6.7% from 18 to 24, 30.7% from 25 to 44, 24.0% from 45 to 64, and 9.3% who were 65 years of age or older. The median age was 36 years. For every 100 females, there were 104.7 males. For every 100 females age 18 and over, there were 105.4 males.

The median income for a household in the township was $57,148, and the median income for a family was $60,583. Males had a median income of $39,063 versus $28,493 for females. The per capita income for the township was $20,747. About 4.2% of families and 5.4% of the population were below the poverty line, including 5.8% of those under age 18 and 7.7% of those age 65 or over.
