= Stanford Township, Isanti County, Minnesota =

Township in Minnesota, United States

Stanford Township
- Township
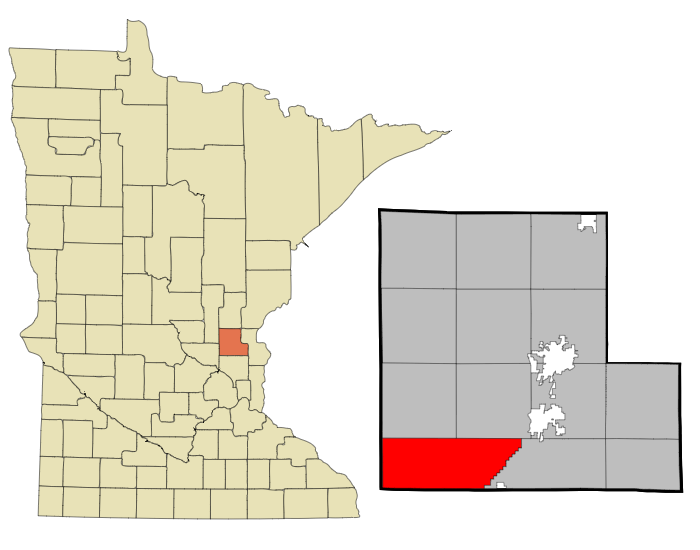
- Location of the township of Stanford within Isanti County, Minnesota
- Coordinates: 45°26′43″N 93°22′41″W
- Country: United States
- State: Minnesota
- County: Isanti

Area
  - Total: 39.4 sq mi (102.1 km^{2})
  - Land: 38.6 sq mi (99.9 km^{2})
  - Water: 0.85 sq mi (2.2 km^{2})
- Elevation: 915 ft (279 m)

Population (2000)
  - Total: 2,075
  - Density: 54/sq mi (20.8/km^{2})
- Time zone: UTC-6 (Central (CST))
  - Summer (DST): UTC-5 (CDT)
- ZIP code: 55070,55398,55040
- Area code: 763
- FIPS code: 27-62374
- GNIS feature ID: 0665693
- Website: https://www.stanfordtownship.com/

Stanford Township is a township in Isanti County, Minnesota, United States. The population was 2,075 at the 2000 census.

== History ==
Stanford had a post office from circa 1898 to 1901, a sawmill on the creek that lay about a mile south of the town, and a school on a site of 0.5 acres (2,000 m^{2}) directly across from the post office. The school existed from approximately 1890 until 1945, when it was converted into a private residence. The school was burned because it was in vast disrepair in 1995, and was replaced with a new home. This community was settled by primarily English settlers from the Eastern United States, although Germans and Scandinavians followed. The town was never more than a farming community or crossroads community- the last remnant was the country school.

=== Today ===
Today, there is no evidence of anything ever being at the site, except for two homes that sit on 1-acre (4,000 m^{2}) lots removed from larger parcels, which are common in this rural area. Sullivan Woods Trail has increasingly become upscale, with large homes in the ancient burr oak forest, with many residents being exurban commuters and residents, in contrast to the original population.

== Geography ==
According to the United States Census Bureau, the township has a total area of 39.4 square miles (102.1 km^{2}), of which 38.6 square miles (99.9 km^{2}) is land and 0.8 square mile (2.2 km^{2}) (2.13%) is water.

== Demographics ==
Historical population
Census	Pop.	Note	%±
1870	215		—
1880	360		67.4%
1890	531		47.5%
1900	729		37.3%
1910	817		12.1%
1920	825		1.0%
1930	676		−18.1%
1940	651		−3.7%
1950	563		−13.5%
1960	714		26.8%
1970	922		29.1%
1980	1,592		72.7%
1990	1,822		14.4%
2000	2,075		13.9%
2010	2,267		9.3%
U.S. Decennial Census

As of the census of 2000, there were 2,075 people, 704 households, and 568 families residing in the township. The population density was 53.8 inhabitants per square mile (20.8/km^{2}). There were 768 housing units at an average density of 19.9/sq mi (7.7/km^{2}). The racial makeup of the township was 97.40% White, 0.24% African American, 0.77% Native American, 0.19% Asian, 0.29% from other races, and 1.11% from two or more races. Hispanic or Latino of any race were 0.77% of the population.

There were 704 households, out of which 37.9% had children under the age of 18 living with them, 70.9% were married couples living together, 4.5% had a female householder with no husband present, and 19.2% were non-families. 15.2% of all households were made up of individuals, and 5.0% had someone living alone who was 65 years of age or older. The average household size was 2.91 and the average family size was 3.23.

In the township the population was spread out, with 28.4% under the age of 18, 8.0% from 18 to 24, 30.0% from 25 to 44, 26.0% from 45 to 64, and 7.6% who were 65 years of age or older. The median age was 36 years. For every 100 females, there were 112.6 males. For every 100 females age 18 and over, there were 110.9 males.

The median income for a household in the township was $56,384, and the median income for a family was $60,260. Males had a median income of $41,205 versus $25,500 for females. The per capita income for the township was $20,958. About 1.9% of families and 3.7% of the population were below the poverty line, including 2.7% of those under age 18 and 7.9% of those age 65 or over.
