= Isanti County, Minnesota =

County in the United States

- County
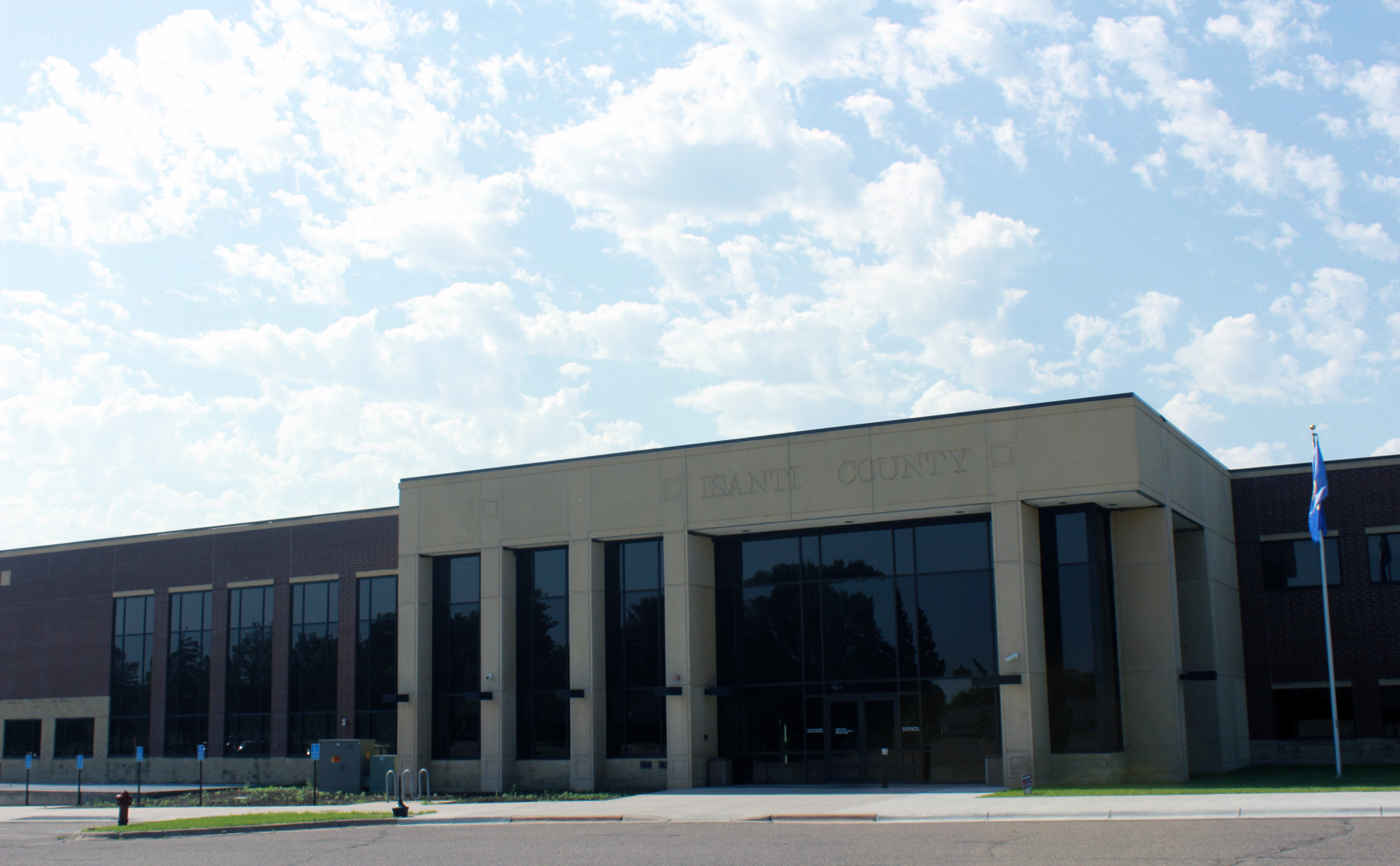
- Isanti County Government Center

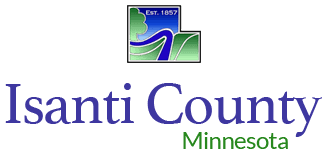
- Logo

- Location within the U.S. state of Minnesota
- Coordinates: 45°34′N 93°17′W
- Country: United States
- State: Minnesota
- Founded: February 13, 1857
- Named for: Izaty Indians
- Seat: Cambridge
- Largest city: Cambridge

Area
  - Total: 452 sq mi (1,170 km^{2})
  - Land: 436 sq mi (1,130 km^{2})
  - Water: 16 sq mi (41 km^{2}) 3.5%

Population (2020)
  - Total: 41,135
  - Estimate (2025): 44,386 ▲
  - Density: 88.8/sq mi (34.3/km^{2})
- Time zone: UTC−6 (Central)
  - Summer (DST): UTC−5 (CDT)
- Congressional district: 8th
- Website: www.isanticountymn.gov

Isanti County (/aɪˈsæntiː/ eye-SAN-tee) is a county in the east-central part of the U.S. state of Minnesota. As of the 2020 census, the population was 41,135. Its county seat is Cambridge.

== History ==
The county was formed on February 13, 1857. Its name came from the Izaty Indians, the ancient name for the Santee Indians, members of the Dakota alliance. Isanti derives from the Dakota word for "knife" and refers to the Santee tribe.

In March 1915, a law was signed to give Minnesota counties the right to choose whether to allow alcohol production. At this point, all cities in Isanti had voted to ban alcohol already. Until May 1965, when county option was eliminated, Isanti County was a dry county; no beverages with over 3.2% alcohol could be sold.

Isanti County is included in the Minneapolis-St. Paul-Bloomington Metropolitan Statistical Area.

== Geography ==
The Rum River flows south through the county's central part. The county's terrain is hilly and etched with drainages and gullies, and dotted with lakes and ponds. The terrain generally slopes to the south and east; its highest point is near its northwest corner, at 1,020 ft (310 m) ASL. The county has an area of 452 square miles (1,170 km^{2}), of which 436 square miles (1,130 km^{2}) is land and 16 square miles (41 km^{2}) (3.5%) is water.

Soils and Savanna distribution in Isanti County

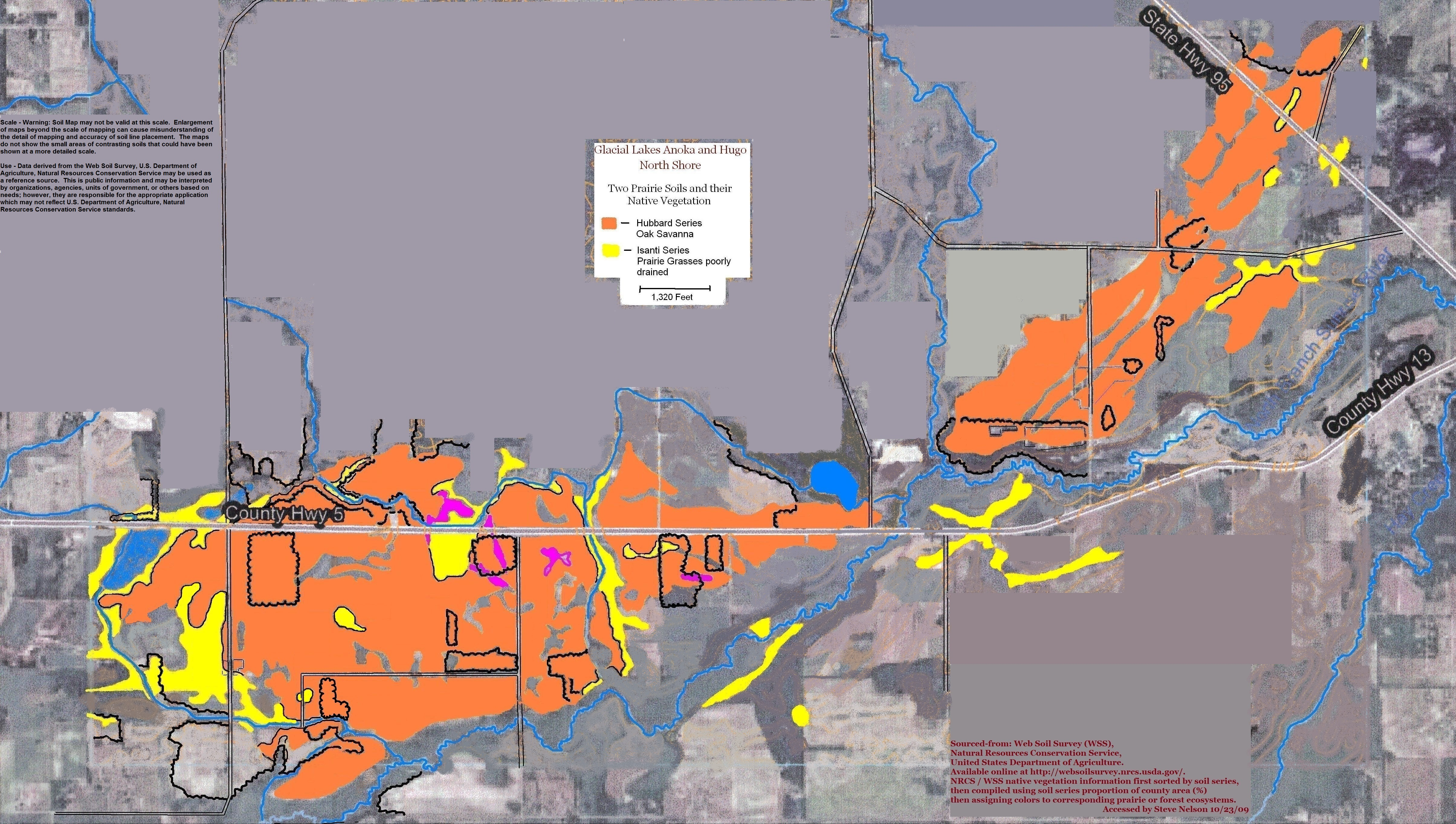
Soils of Isanti County's Tip Toe Savannas

=== Major highways ===
- Minnesota State Highway 47
- Minnesota State Highway 65
- Minnesota State Highway 95
- Minnesota State Highway 107
- List of county roads

=== Adjacent counties ===
- Kanabec County - north
- Pine County - northeast
- Chisago County - east
- Anoka County - south
- Sherburne County - southwest
- Mille Lacs County - northwest

=== Protected areas ===
- Cranberry Wildlife Management Area
- Crooked Road State Wildlife Management Area
- Marget Lake State Wildlife Management Area
- Marvin W. Schubring Memorial Wildlife Management Area
- Maywood County Park
- Spectacle Lake Wildlife Management Area
- Springvale County Park
- Twin Lake Scientific and Natural Area

== Demographics ==
Historical population
Census	Pop.	Note	%±
1860	284		—
1870	2,035		616.5%
1880	5,063		148.8%
1890	7,607		50.2%
1900	11,675		53.5%
1910	12,615		8.1%
1920	13,278		5.3%
1930	12,081		−9.0%
1940	12,950		7.2%
1950	12,123		−6.4%
1960	13,530		11.6%
1970	16,560		22.4%
1980	23,600		42.5%
1990	25,921		9.8%
2000	31,287		20.7%
2010	37,816		20.9%
2020	41,135		8.8%
2025 (est.)	44,386	▲	7.9%
U.S. Decennial Census; 1790-1960 1900-1990; 1990-2000 2010-2020

=== Racial and ethnic composition ===
Isanti County, Minnesota – Racial and ethnic composition Note: the US Census treats Hispanic/Latino as an ethnic category. This table excludes Latinos from the racial categories and assigns them to a separate category. Hispanics/Latinos may be of any race.
Race / Ethnicity (NH = Non-Hispanic)	Pop 1980	Pop 1990	Pop 2000	Pop 2010	Pop 2020	% 1980	% 1990	% 2000	% 2010	% 2020
White alone (NH)	23,291	25,492	30,383	35,958	37,559	98.69%	98.34%	97.11%	95.09%	91.31%
Black or African American alone (NH)	44	67	78	228	314	0.19%	0.26%	0.25%	0.60%	0.76%
Native American or Alaska Native alone (NH)	76	134	169	163	201	0.32%	0.52%	0.54%	0.43%	0.49%
Asian alone (NH)	60	105	120	302	488	0.25%	0.41%	0.38%	0.80%	1.19%
Native Hawaiian or Pacific Islander alone (NH)	x	x	4	12	13	x	x	0.01%	0.03%	0.03%
Other race alone (NH)	18	4	11	20	154	0.08%	0.02%	0.04%	0.05%	0.37%
Mixed race or Multiracial (NH)	x	x	263	551	1,510	x	x	0.84%	1.46%	3.67%
Hispanic or Latino (any race)	111	119	259	582	896	0.47%	0.46%	0.83%	1.54%	2.18%
Total	23,600	25,921	31,287	37,816	41,135	100.00%	100.00%	100.00%	100.00%	100.00%

=== 2020 census ===
As of the 2020 census, the county had a population of 41,135. The median age was 39.6 years. 24.1% of residents were under the age of 18 and 16.7% of residents were 65 years of age or older. For every 100 females there were 101.0 males, and for every 100 females age 18 and over there were 99.5 males age 18 and over.

The racial makeup of the county was 92.1% White, 0.8% Black or African American, 0.5% American Indian and Alaska Native, 1.2% Asian, <0.1% Native Hawaiian and Pacific Islander, 0.8% from some other race, and 4.5% from two or more races. Hispanic or Latino residents of any race comprised 2.2% of the population.

40.7% of residents lived in urban areas, while 59.3% lived in rural areas.

There were 15,615 households in the county, of which 32.2% had children under the age of 18 living in them. Of all households, 53.9% were married-couple households, 16.4% were households with a male householder and no spouse or partner present, and 19.7% were households with a female householder and no spouse or partner present. About 22.7% of all households were made up of individuals and 10.3% had someone living alone who was 65 years of age or older.

There were 16,550 housing units, of which 5.6% were vacant. Among occupied housing units, 82.5% were owner-occupied and 17.5% were renter-occupied. The homeowner vacancy rate was 0.8% and the rental vacancy rate was 5.3%.

=== 2010 census ===
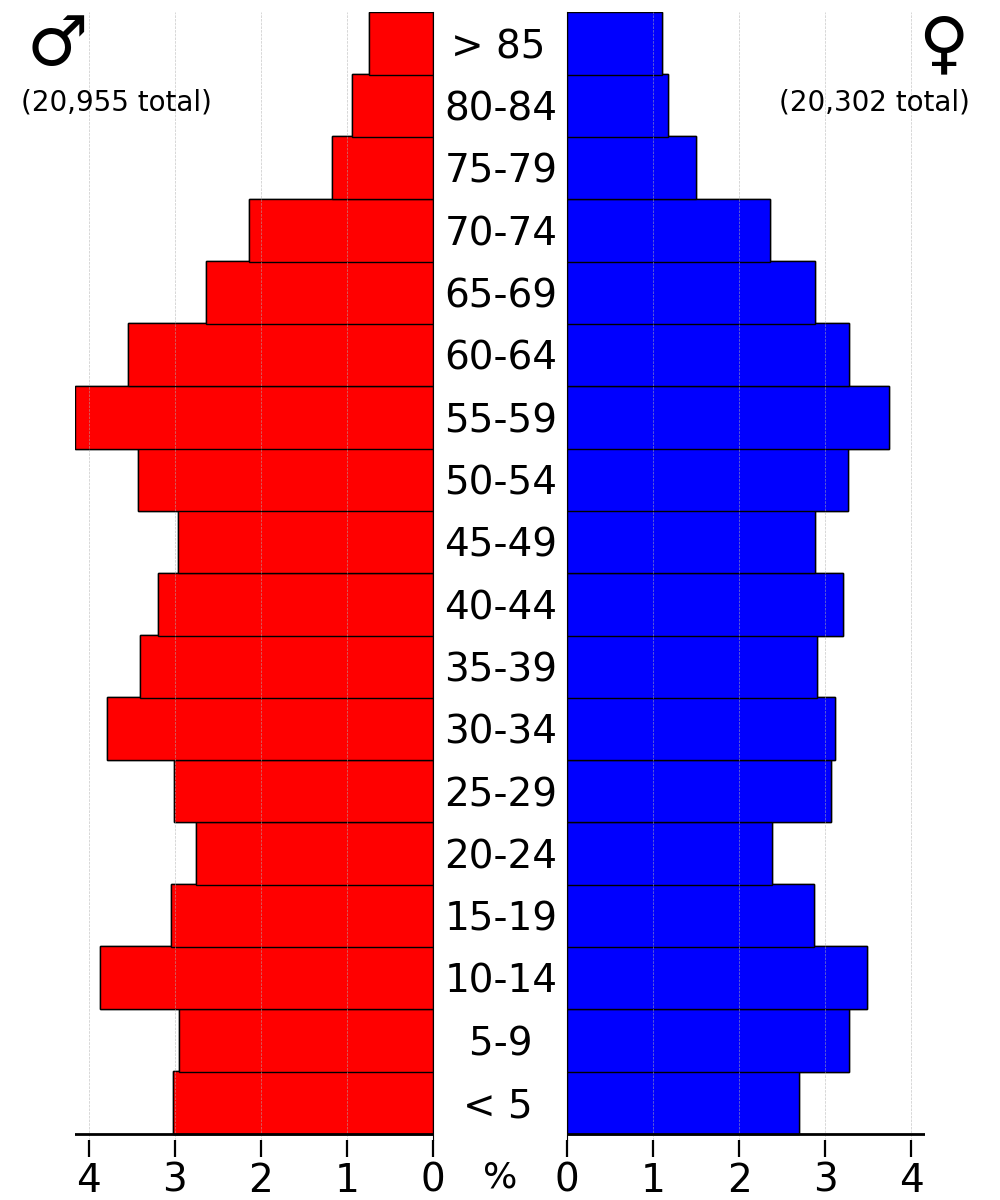
2022 US Census population pyramid for Isanti County, from ACS 5-year estimates

As of the census of 2010, there were 37,816 people, 14,331 households, and 8,415 families in the county. The population density was 86.7 per square mile (33.5/km^{2}). There were 12,062 housing units at an average density of 27.7 per square mile (10.7/km^{2}). The racial makeup of the county was 96.0% White, 0.6% Black or African American, 0.5% Native American, 0.8% Asian, 0% Pacific Islander, 1.6% from other races, and 0.94% from two or more races. 1.5% of the population were Hispanic or Latino of any race. 30.3% were of German, 21.3% Swedish, 12.7% Norwegian and 5.1% Irish ancestry.

There were 11,236 households, of which 38.1% had children under 18 living with them, 62.1% were married couples living together, 8.4% had a female householder with no husband present, and 25.1% were non-families. 20.1% of all households were made up of individuals, and 8.2% had someone living alone who was 65 or older. The average household size was 2.74 and the average family size was 3.15.

The county population contained 28.7% under 18, 7.8% from 18 to 24, 30.4% from 25 to 44, 22.2% from 45 to 64, and 10.8% who were 65 or older. The median age was 36. For every 100 females there were 100.5 males. For every 100 females age 18 and over, there were 98.8 males.

The median income for a household in the county was $50,127, and the median income for a family was $55,996. Males had a median income of $39,381 versus $26,427 for females. The per capita income for the county was $20,348. About 4.0% of families and 5.7% of the population were below the poverty line, including 5.7% of those under 18 and 8.6% of those 65 or older.

== Communities ==
=== Cities ===
- Braham (partially in Kanabec County)
- Cambridge (county seat)
- Isanti
- St. Francis (mostly in Anoka County)

=== Census-designated place ===
- Stanchfield

=== Unincorporated communities ===
- Andree
- Bodum (ghost town)
- Athens
- Blomford
- Bradford
- Carmody
- Crown
- Dalbo
- Day
- Edgewood
- Elm Park
- Grandy
- Oxlip
- Pine Brook
- Spencer Brook
- Spring Lake
- Springvale
- Stanchfield Corner
- Stanford
- Stanley
- Walbo
- Weber
- West Point
- Wyanett

=== Townships ===
- Athens Township
- Bradford Township
- Cambridge Township
- Dalbo Township
- Isanti Township
- Maple Ridge Township
- North Branch Township
- Oxford Township
- Spencer Brook Township
- Springvale Township
- Stanchfield Township
- Stanford Township
- Wyanett Township

== Politics ==
This rural turned exurban county is more conservative than the state as a whole. In 2008, John McCain won Isanti County with almost 57% of the vote, while losing the state with 44% of the vote. Norm Coleman also did well, obtaining 48% of the vote while losing the state with 42%. Both George W. Bush and Tim Pawlenty won this county twice, winning a majority of the county each time.

Democrats tend to do poorly here. In 2008, Barack Obama obtained just 41% of the vote while he won the state with 54%. Al Franken received just 33% of Isanti County's votes. Since 1992, no Democrat has won this county with over 50% of the vote. In 2016, Donald Trump won almost 65% of the vote here while narrowly losing the state to Hillary Clinton. Trump increased his vote share to just over 68% in 2020 and to nearly 70% in 2024.

Independents also do well in this county. In 1998, the county's results were Jesse Ventura's best in the state, as he won the county with over 50% of the vote. Ross Perot came in a close third place with 29% of the vote while getting 24% statewide.

United States presidential election results for Isanti County, Minnesota
Year	Republican		Democratic		Third party(ies)	
Year	No.	%	No.	%	No.	%
1892	728	52.11%	105	7.52%	564	40.37%
1896	1,490	66.52%	750	33.48%	0	0.00%
1900	1,525	72.69%	504	24.02%	69	3.29%
1904	1,603	84.06%	137	7.18%	167	8.76%
1908	1,198	58.47%	466	22.74%	385	18.79%
1912	314	14.54%	333	15.42%	1,513	70.05%
1916	1,123	48.18%	935	40.11%	273	11.71%
1920	3,007	67.57%	405	9.10%	1,038	23.33%
1924	1,588	39.54%	79	1.97%	2,349	58.49%
1928	3,137	71.13%	1,191	27.01%	82	1.86%
1932	1,484	30.43%	3,147	64.53%	246	5.04%
1936	1,437	28.05%	3,442	67.19%	244	4.76%
1940	2,617	48.82%	2,654	49.51%	90	1.68%
1944	2,205	49.14%	2,225	49.59%	57	1.27%
1948	1,918	38.41%	2,758	55.23%	318	6.37%
1952	2,682	52.16%	2,393	46.54%	67	1.30%
1956	2,348	47.35%	2,605	52.53%	6	0.12%
1960	3,067	53.86%	2,599	45.64%	28	0.49%
1964	1,982	32.93%	4,026	66.90%	10	0.17%
1968	2,429	38.33%	3,439	54.27%	469	7.40%
1972	3,715	48.66%	3,660	47.94%	259	3.39%
1976	3,159	33.55%	6,013	63.85%	245	2.60%
1980	4,480	41.45%	5,457	50.49%	872	8.07%
1984	5,660	50.91%	5,378	48.38%	79	0.71%
1988	5,246	45.81%	6,075	53.05%	131	1.14%
1992	3,988	29.84%	5,386	40.30%	3,992	29.87%
1996	4,450	34.35%	6,041	46.63%	2,464	19.02%
2000	7,668	51.36%	6,247	41.84%	1,014	6.79%
2004	11,190	57.94%	7,883	40.82%	240	1.24%
2008	11,324	56.47%	8,248	41.13%	481	2.40%
2012	11,675	57.75%	8,024	39.69%	518	2.56%
2016	13,635	64.88%	5,657	26.92%	1,724	8.20%
2020	16,491	68.05%	7,138	29.45%	606	2.50%
2024	18,027	69.55%	7,384	28.49%	507	1.96%

== See also ==
- National Register of Historic Places listings in Isanti County, Minnesota
