= Spencer Brook Township, Isanti County, Minnesota =

Township in Minnesota, United States

Spencer Brook Township
- Township
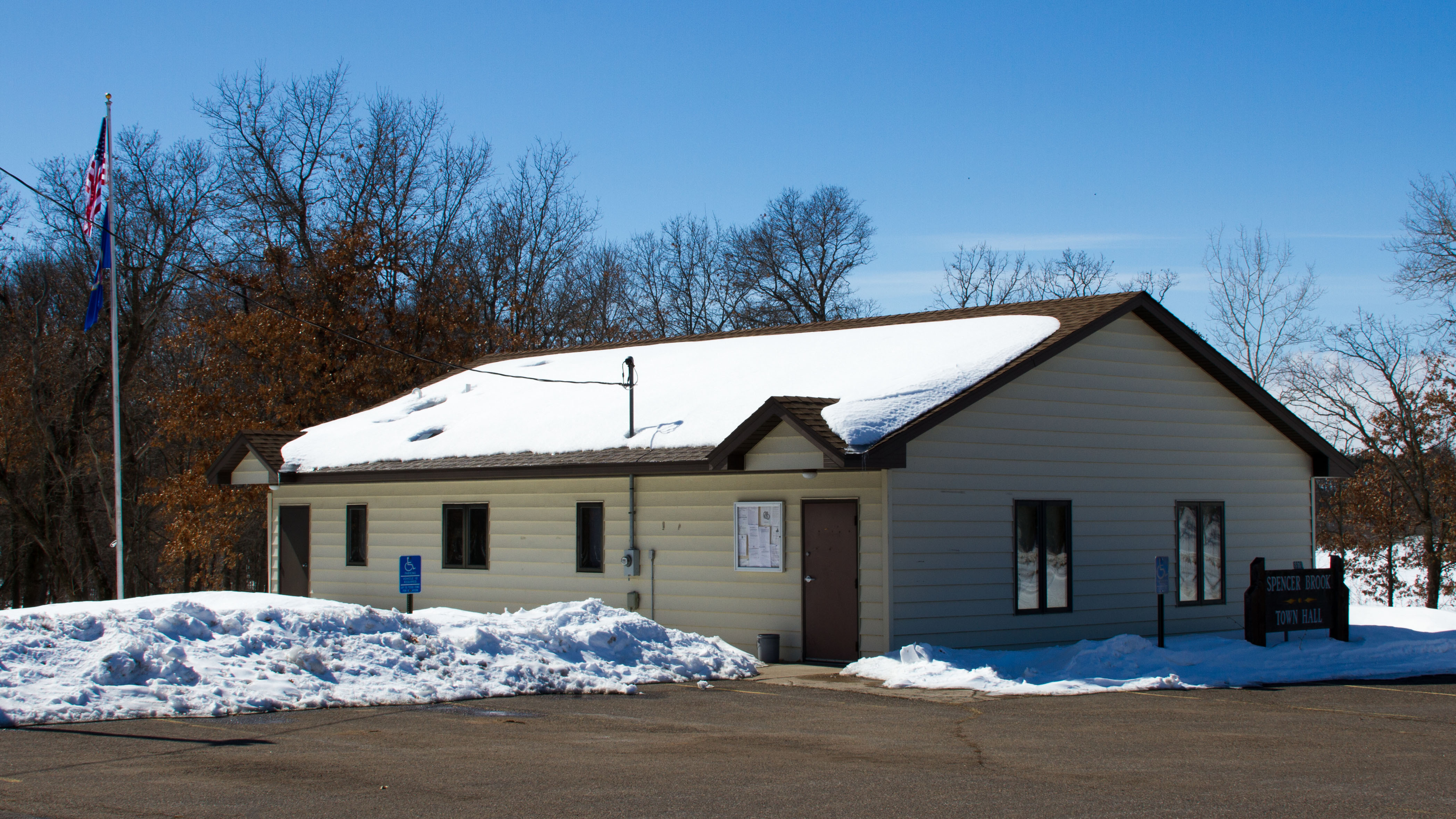
- Spencer Brook Town Hall

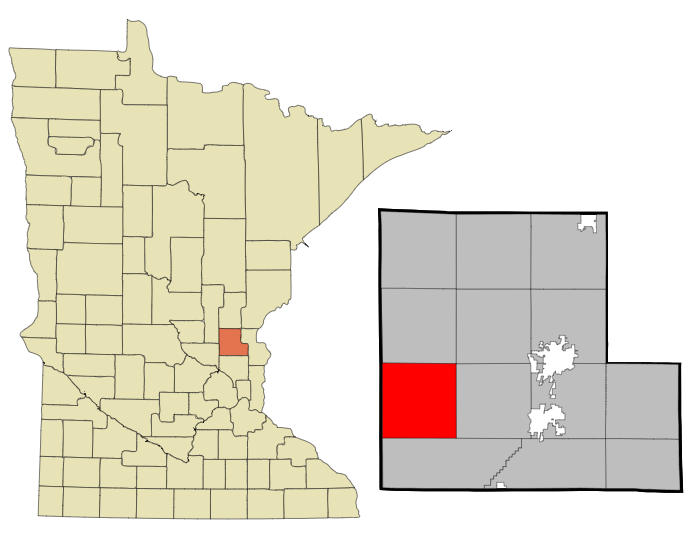
- Location of the township of Spencer Brook within Isanti County, Minnesota
- Coordinates: 45°30′46″N 93°26′49″W
- Country: United States
- State: Minnesota
- County: Isanti

Area
  - Total: 35.4 sq mi (91.8 km^{2})
  - Land: 34.4 sq mi (89.0 km^{2})
  - Water: 1.1 sq mi (2.8 km^{2})
- Elevation: 945 ft (288 m)

Population (2000)
  - Total: 1,638
  - Density: 44/sq mi (16.8/km^{2})
- Time zone: UTC-6 (Central (CST))
  - Summer (DST): UTC-5 (CDT)
- FIPS code: 27-61672
- GNIS feature ID: 0665662
- Website: https://spencerbrooktwp.org/

Spencer Brook Township is a township in Isanti County, Minnesota, United States. The population was 1,495 at the 2000 census.

This township took its name from Spencer Brook.

== Geography ==
According to the United States Census Bureau, the township has a total area of 35.4 square miles (91.8 km^{2}), of which 34.3 square miles (89.0 km^{2}) is land and 1.1 square miles (2.8 km^{2}) (3.05%) is water.

== Demographics ==
Historical population
Census	Pop.	Note	%±
1870	403		—
1880	295		−26.8%
1890	386		30.8%
1900	500		29.5%
1910	510		2.0%
1920	730		43.1%
1930	591		−19.0%
1940	576		−2.5%
1950	429		−25.5%
1960	499		16.3%
1970	666		33.5%
1980	1,146		72.1%
1990	1,203		5.0%
2000	1,495		24.3%
2010	1,589		6.3%
U.S. Decennial Census

As of the census of 2000, there were 1,495 people, 532 households, and 427 families residing in the township. The population density was 43.5 inhabitants per square mile (16.8/km^{2}). There were 602 housing units at an average density of 17.5/sq mi (6.8/km^{2}). The racial makeup of the township was 97.59% White, 0.74% Native American, 0.33% Asian, and 1.34% from two or more races. Hispanic or Latino of any race were 0.40% of the population.

There were 532 households, out of which 35.2% had children under the age of 18 living with them, 70.3% were married couples living together, 4.1% had a female householder with no husband present, and 19.7% were non-families. 14.3% of all households were made up of individuals, and 3.4% had someone living alone who was 65 years of age or older. The average household size was 2.81 and the average family size was 3.10.

In the township the population was spread out, with 26.6% under the age of 18, 7.2% from 18 to 24, 31.9% from 25 to 44, 25.6% from 45 to 64, and 8.8% who were 65 years of age or older. The median age was 37 years. For every 100 females, there were 103.1 males. For every 100 females age 18 and over, there were 107.6 males.

The median income for a household in the township was $55,500, and the median income for a family was $58,235. Males had a median income of $39,333 versus $29,038 for females. The per capita income for the township was $21,615. About 1.8% of families and 3.7% of the population were below the poverty line, including 6.6% of those under age 18 and 2.3% of those age 65 or over.
