= Athens Township, Isanti County, Minnesota =

Township in Minnesota, United States

Athens Township
- Township
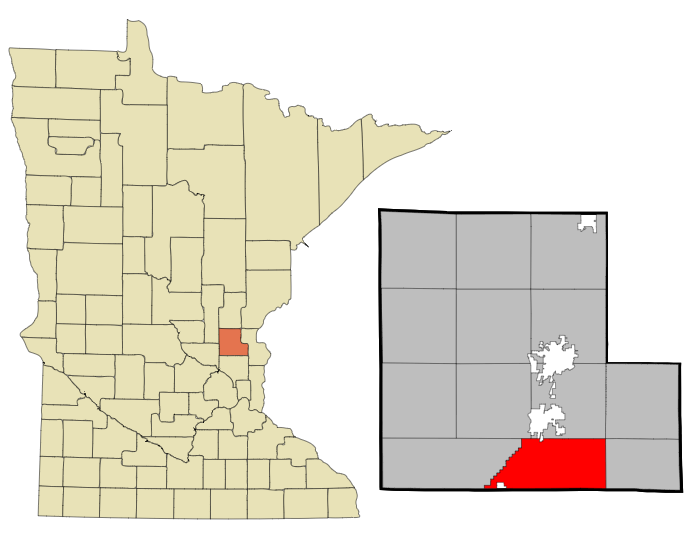
- Location of the township of Athens within Isanti County, Minnesota
- Coordinates: 45°26′47″N 93°14′40″W
- Country: United States
- State: Minnesota
- County: Isanti

Area
  - Total: 31.7 sq mi (82.2 km^{2})
  - Land: 31.4 sq mi (81.2 km^{2})
  - Water: 0.39 sq mi (1.0 km^{2})
- Elevation: 925 ft (282 m)

Population (2000)
  - Total: 2,322
  - Density: 74/sq mi (28.6/km^{2})
- Time zone: UTC-6 (Central (CST))
  - Summer (DST): UTC-5 (CDT)
- FIPS code: 27-02602
- GNIS feature ID: 0663470
- Website: https://athenstownshipmn.gov/

Athens Township is a township in Isanti County, Minnesota. The population was 2,322 in the 2000 census.

The township was named directly or indirectly after Athens, the capital of Greece.

== Geography ==
According to the United States Census Bureau, the township has a total area of 31.8 square miles (82 km^{2}), of which 31.4 square miles (81 km^{2}) is land and 0.4 square miles (1.0 km^{2}) (1.23%) is water.

The Cedar Creek Long-Term Ecological Research Site (LTER), an ecosystem ecology and biodiversity research area owned and operated by the University of Minnesota, lies partially within the boundaries of Athens township (the rest is in nearby Anoka County). Although a scarce nine square miles in area, Cedar Creek LTER sits at the confluence of three major North American biomes (Boreal Forest, Deciduous Forest, and Prairie), and as such is regarded as an ecologists "dream laboratory." In fact, it was through his extensive studies at the township's Cedar Bog Lake that the seminal ecology researcher Raymond Lindeman first laid the groundwork for what was to become the modern science of ecosystem ecology.

== Demographics ==
Historical population
Census	Pop.	Note	%±
1880	46		—
1890	421		815.2%
1900	601		42.8%
1910	597		−0.7%
1920	647		8.4%
1930	558		−13.8%
1940	467		−16.3%
1950	468		0.2%
1960	455		−2.8%
1970	849		86.6%
1980	1,793		111.2%
1990	2,062		15.0%
2000	2,322		12.6%
2010	2,177		−6.2%
U.S. Decennial Census

As of the census of 2000, there were 2,322 people, 779 households, and 627 families residing in the township. The population density was 74.0 inhabitants per square mile (28.6/km^{2}). There were 804 housing units at an average density of 25.6 per square mile (9.9/km^{2}). The racial makeup of the township was 98.06% White, 0.30% African American, 0.52% Native American, 0.22% Asian, 0.17% from other races, and 0.73% from two or more races. Hispanic or Latino of any race were 0.69% of the population.

There were 779 households, out of which 39.7% had children under the age of 18 living with them, 66.1% were married couples living together, 8.5% had a female householder with no husband present, and 19.5% were non-families. 13.4% of all households were made up of individuals, and 1.8% had someone living alone who was 65 years of age or older. The average household size was 2.98 and the average family size was 3.24.

In the township the population was spread out, with 29.9% under the age of 18, 8.3% from 18 to 24, 31.6% from 25 to 44, 23.9% from 45 to 64, and 6.3% who were 65 years of age or older. The median age was 34 years. For every 100 females, there were 107.3 males. For every 100 females age 18 and over, there were 105.0 males.

The median income for a household in the township was $53,807, and the median income for a family was $60,650. Males had a median income of $40,744 versus $24,038 for females. The per capita income for the township was $22,005. About 3.0% of families and 3.6% of the population were below the poverty line, including 3.7% of those under age 18 and 4.1% of those age 65 or over.
