= Wyanett Township, Isanti County, Minnesota =

Township in Minnesota, United States

Wyanett Township
- Township
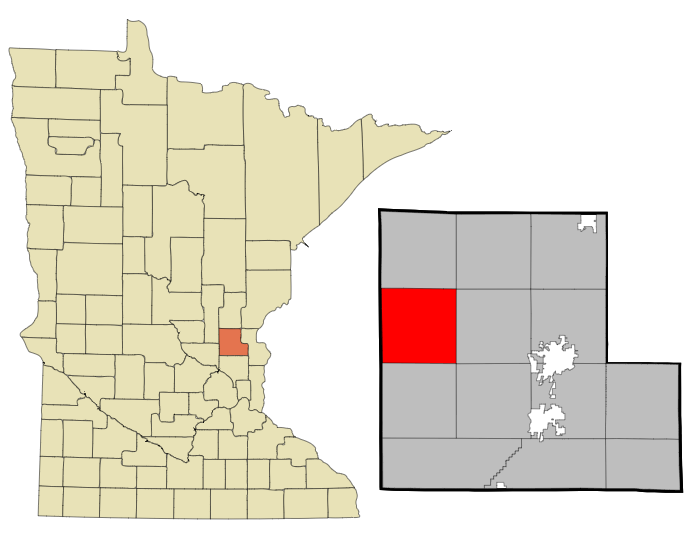
- Location of the township of Wyanett within Isanti County, Minnesota
- Coordinates: 45°35′40″N 93°26′46″W
- Country: United States
- State: Minnesota
- County: Isanti

Area
  - Total: 35.7 sq mi (92.5 km^{2})
  - Land: 33.2 sq mi (86.0 km^{2})
  - Water: 2.5 sq mi (6.5 km^{2})
- Elevation: 981 ft (299 m)

Population (2000)
  - Total: 1,698
  - Density: 51/sq mi (19.7/km^{2})
- Time zone: UTC-6 (Central (CST))
  - Summer (DST): UTC-5 (CDT)
- FIPS code: 27-71896
- GNIS feature ID: 0666060
- Website: http://wyanetttownship.com/

Wyanett Township is a township in Isanti County, Minnesota, United States. The population was 1,698 at the 2000 census.

Wyanett Township derives its name from a place in Illinois.

== Geography ==
According to the United States Census Bureau, the township has a total area of 35.7 square miles (92.5 km^{2}), of which 33.2 square miles (86.0 km^{2}) is land and 2.5 square miles (6.5 km^{2}) (7.00%) is water.

== Demographics ==
Historical population
Census	Pop.	Note	%±
1880	369		—
1890	550		49.1%
1900	942		71.3%
1910	1,026		8.9%
1920	896		−12.7%
1930	703		−21.5%
1940	652		−7.3%
1950	639		−2.0%
1960	617		−3.4%
1970	927		50.2%
1980	1,429		54.2%
1990	1,377		−3.6%
2000	1,698		23.3%
2010	1,729		1.8%
U.S. Decennial Census

As of the census of 2000, there were 1,698 people, 620 households, and 497 families residing in the township. The population density was 51.1 inhabitants per square mile (19.7/km^{2}). There were 767 housing units at an average density of 23.1/sq mi (8.9/km^{2}). The racial makeup of the township was 97.94% White, 0.24% African American, 0.29% Native American, 0.35% Asian, 0.18% from other races, and 1.00% from two or more races. Hispanic or Latino of any race were 1.59% of the population.

There were 620 households, out of which 32.4% had children under the age of 18 living with them, 71.6% were married couples living together, 4.4% had a female householder with no husband present, and 19.7% were non-families. 15.6% of all households were made up of individuals, and 5.5% had someone living alone who was 65 years of age or older. The average household size was 2.74 and the average family size was 3.02.

In the township the population was spread out, with 25.6% under the age of 18, 6.8% from 18 to 24, 27.8% from 25 to 44, 27.4% from 45 to 64, and 12.5% who were 65 years of age or older. The median age was 40 years. For every 100 females, there were 105.3 males. For every 100 females age 18 and over, there were 105.9 males.

The median income for a household in the township was $53,309, and the median income for a family was $61,806. Males had a median income of $41,612 versus $29,922 for females. The per capita income for the township was $22,481. About 3.3% of families and 4.9% of the population were below the poverty line, including 3.5% of those under age 18 and 5.7% of those age 65 or over.
