= North Branch Township, Isanti County, Minnesota =

Township in Minnesota, United States

North Branch Township
- Township
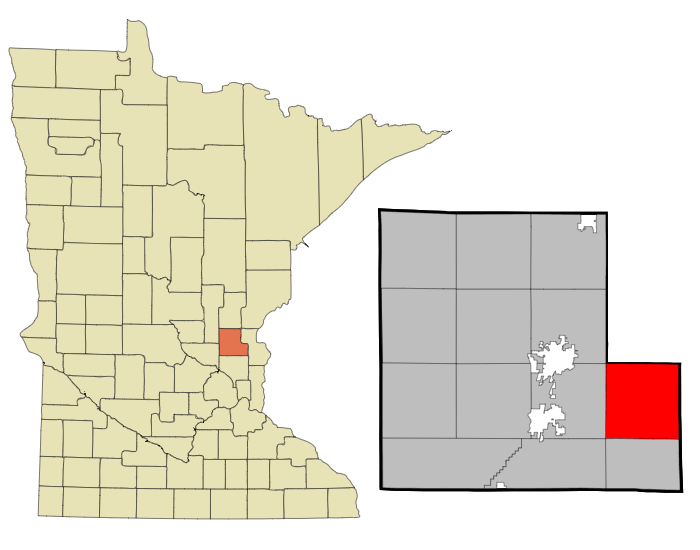
- Location of the township of North Branch within Isanti County, Minnesota
- Coordinates: 45°30′35″N 93°5′0″W
- Country: United States
- State: Minnesota
- County: Isanti

Area
  - Total: 35.0 sq mi (90.6 km^{2})
  - Land: 34.6 sq mi (89.7 km^{2})
  - Water: 0.35 sq mi (0.9 km^{2})
- Elevation: 932 ft (284 m)

Population (2000)
  - Total: 1,654
  - Density: 48/sq mi (18.4/km^{2})
- Time zone: UTC-6 (Central (CST))
  - Summer (DST): UTC-5 (CDT)
- FIPS code: 27-46816
- GNIS feature ID: 0665145
- Website: https://twp.northbranch.mn.us/

North Branch Township is a township in Isanti County, Minnesota, United States. The population was 1,654 at the 2000 census.

This township took its name from the north branch of the Sunrise River.

== Geography ==
According to the United States Census Bureau, the township has a total area of 35.0 square miles (90.6 km^{2}), of which 34.7 square miles (89.7 km^{2}) is land and 0.3 square mile (0.9 km^{2}) (0.97%) is water.

== Demographics ==
Historical population
Census	Pop.	Note	%±
1870	224		—
1880	707		215.6%
1890	885		25.2%
1900	1,139		28.7%
1910	1,090		−4.3%
1920	1,028		−5.7%
1930	820		−20.2%
1940	773		−5.7%
1950	739		−4.4%
1960	693		−6.2%
1970	960		38.5%
1980	1,507		57.0%
1990	1,486		−1.4%
2000	1,654		11.3%
2010	1,779		7.6%
U.S. Decennial Census

As of the census of 2000, there were 1,654 people, 597 households, and 475 families residing in the township. The population density was 47.7 inhabitants per square mile (18.4/km^{2}). There were 616 housing units at an average density of 17.8/sq mi (6.9/km^{2}). The racial makeup of the township was 97.82% White, 0.85% Native American, 0.42% Asian, 0.12% from other races, and 0.79% from two or more races. Hispanic or Latino of any race were 1.15% of the population.

There were 597 households, out of which 36.7% had children under the age of 18 living with them, 68.0% were married couples living together, 6.4% had a female householder with no husband present, and 20.3% were non-families. 15.2% of all households were made up of individuals, and 5.4% had someone living alone who was 65 years of age or older. The average household size was 2.75 and the average family size was 3.04.

In the township the population was spread out, with 25.9% under the age of 18, 6.4% from 18 to 24, 31.2% from 25 to 44, 28.1% from 45 to 64, and 8.5% who were 65 years of age or older. The median age was 38 years. For every 100 females, there were 102.9 males. For every 100 females age 18 and over, there were 110.7 males.

The median income for a household in the township was $55,833, and the median income for a family was $59,917. Males had a median income of $41,020 versus $28,289 for females. The per capita income for the township was $21,849. About 1.9% of families and 2.3% of the population were below the poverty line, including 2.1% of those under age 18 and 4.8% of those age 65 or over.
