= Bradford Township, Isanti County, Minnesota =

Township in Minnesota, United States

Bradford Township
- Township
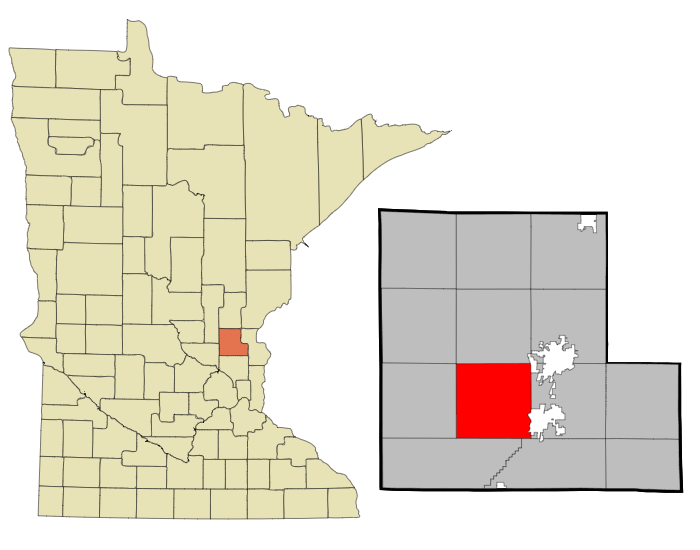
- Location of the township of Bradford within Isanti County, Minnesota
- Coordinates: 45°30′19″N 93°19′24″W
- Country: United States
- State: Minnesota
- County: Isanti

Area
  - Total: 35.9 sq mi (93.1 km^{2})
  - Land: 34.5 sq mi (89.3 km^{2})
  - Water: 1.5 sq mi (3.8 km^{2})
- Elevation: 922 ft (281 m)

Population (2000)
  - Total: 3,472
  - Density: 101/sq mi (38.9/km^{2})
- Time zone: UTC-6 (Central (CST))
  - Summer (DST): UTC-5 (CDT)
- FIPS code: 27-07246
- GNIS feature ID: 0663646
- Website: https://bradfordtownship.org/

Bradford Township is a township in Isanti County, Minnesota, United States. The population was 3,472 at the 2000 census.

Bradford Township was named after Bradford, England, the native home of an early settler.

== Geography ==
According to the United States Census Bureau, the township has a total area of 35.9 square miles (93 km^{2}), of which 34.5 square miles (89 km^{2}) is land and 1.5 square miles (3.9 km^{2}) (4.12%) is water.

== Demographics ==
Historical population
Census	Pop.	Note	%±
1880	375		—
1890	468		24.8%
1900	658		40.6%
1910	775		17.8%
1920	754		−2.7%
1930	641		−15.0%
1940	571		−10.9%
1950	507		−11.2%
1960	539		6.3%
1970	912		69.2%
1980	2,370		159.9%
1990	2,637		11.3%
2000	3,472		31.7%
2010	3,380		−2.6%
U.S. Decennial Census

As of the census of 2000, there were 3,472 people, 1,163 households, and 945 families residing in the township. The population density was 100.8 inhabitants per square mile (38.9/km^{2}). There were 1,276 housing units at an average density of 37.0 per square mile (14.3/km^{2}). The racial makeup of the township was 97.87% White, 0.29% African American, 0.52% Native American, 0.40% Asian, 0.09% Pacific Islander, 0.12% from other races, and 0.72% from two or more races. Hispanic or Latino of any race were 0.72% of the population.

Also from the 2000 census, there were 1,163 households, out of which 44.5% had children under the age of 18 living with them, 71.0% were married couples living together, 5.4% had a female householder with no husband present, and 18.7% were non-families. 14.3% of all households were made up of individuals, and 3.7% had someone living alone who was 65 years of age or older.

The average household size was 2.99 and the average family size was 3.28.

In the township the population was spread out, with 30.7% under the age of 18, 7.9% from 18 to 24, 34.4% from 25 to 44, 21.8% from 45 to 64, and 5.2% who were 65 years of age or older. The median age was 34 years. For every 100 females, there were 112.2 males. For every 100 females age 18 and over, there were 113.2 males.

The median income for a household in the township was $55,515, and the median income for a family was $60,257. Males had a median income of $40,335 versus $28,359 for females. The per capita income for the township was $19,888. About 3.2% of families and 3.3% of the population were below the poverty line, including 3.3% of those under age 18 and 5.3% of those age 65 or over.
