= Isanti, Minnesota =

City in the United States

Isanti
- City
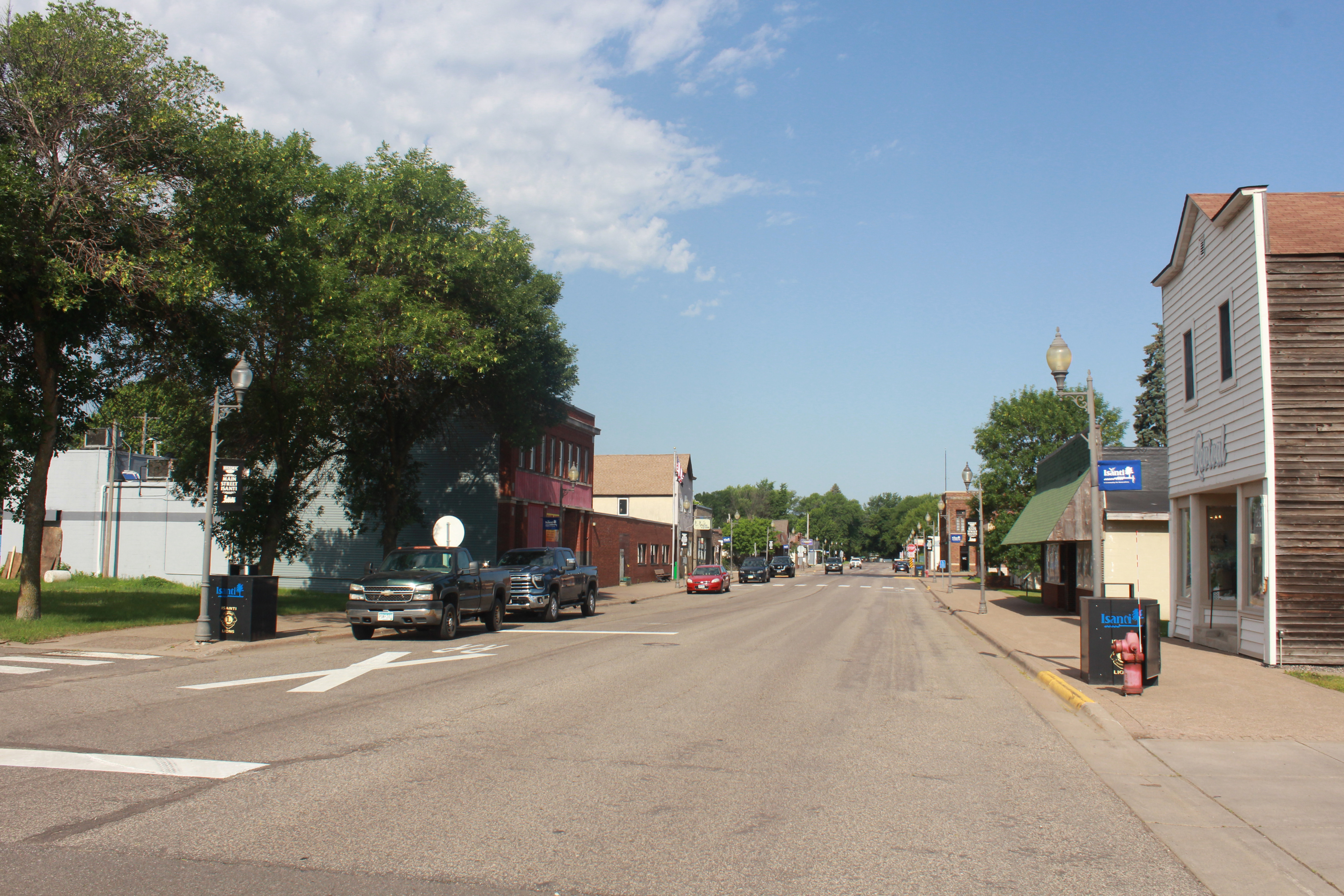
- Main Street in Isanti
- Motto: A Community for Generations
- Interactive map of Isanti
- Coordinates: 45°29′34″N 93°14′52″W
- Country: United States
- State: Minnesota
- County: Isanti

Area
  - Total: 5.13 sq mi (13.29 km^{2})
  - Land: 5.09 sq mi (13.19 km^{2})
  - Water: 0.039 sq mi (0.10 km^{2})
- Elevation: 942 ft (287 m)

Population (2020)
  - Total: 6,804
  - Density: 1,336.2/sq mi (515.91/km^{2})
- Time zone: UTC-6 (Central)
  - Summer (DST): UTC-5 (Central)
- Zip code: 55040
- Area code: 763
- FIPS code: 27-31328
- GNIS feature ID: 2395443
- Website: www.cityofisanti.us

Isanti (/aɪˈsænti/ eye-SAN-tee) is a city in Isanti County, Minnesota, United States. The population was 6,804 at the 2020 census. The name Isanti is composed of two Dakota words: isan ("knife") and ati ("camp"), and refers to the Santee Dakota people.

Minnesota State Highway 65 and Isanti County Road 5 are the main routes in Isanti.

== Geography ==
According to the United States Census Bureau, the city has an area of 4.85 square miles (12.56 km^{2}), of which 4.81 square miles (12.46 km^{2}) is land and 0.04 square miles (0.10 km^{2}) is water. The Rum River flows through Isanti's western edge.

== Demographics ==
Historical population
| Census | Pop. | Note | %± |
|---|---|---|---|
| 1910 | 316 | | — |
| 1920 | 411 | | 30.1% |
| 1930 | 371 | | −9.7% |
| 1940 | 354 | | −4.6% |
| 1950 | 422 | | 19.2% |
| 1960 | 521 | | 23.5% |
| 1970 | 679 | | 30.3% |
| 1980 | 858 | | 26.4% |
| 1990 | 1,228 | | 43.1% |
| 2000 | 2,324 | | 89.3% |
| 2010 | 5,251 | | 125.9% |
| 2020 | 6,804 | | 29.6% |
U.S. Decennial Census

=== 2020 census ===
As of the 2020 census, Isanti had a population of 6,804. The median age was 31.8 years. 30.1% of residents were under the age of 18 and 9.4% of residents were 65 years of age or older. For every 100 females there were 100.9 males, and for every 100 females age 18 and over there were 98.2 males age 18 and over.

97.1% of residents lived in urban areas, while 2.9% lived in rural areas.

There were 2,458 households in Isanti, of which 42.9% had children under the age of 18 living in them. Of all households, 48.1% were married-couple households, 16.0% were households with a male householder and no spouse or partner present, and 21.3% were households with a female householder and no spouse or partner present. About 22.2% of all households were made up of individuals and 8.3% had someone living alone who was 65 years of age or older.

There were 2,510 housing units, of which 2.1% were vacant. The homeowner vacancy rate was 0.5% and the rental vacancy rate was 3.4%.

Racial composition as of the 2020 census
| Race | Number | Percent |
|---|---|---|
| White | 6,112 | 89.8% |
| Black or African American | 95 | 1.4% |
| American Indian and Alaska Native | 42 | 0.6% |
| Asian | 80 | 1.2% |
| Native Hawaiian and Other Pacific Islander | 0 | 0.0% |
| Some other race | 86 | 1.3% |
| Two or more races | 389 | 5.7% |
| Hispanic or Latino (of any race) | 258 | 3.8% |

=== 2010 census ===
As of the census of 2010, there were 5,251 people, 1,871 households, and 1,336 families living in the city. The population density was 1,091.7 inhabitants per square mile (421.5/km^{2}). There were 2,038 housing units at an average density of 423.7 units per square mile (163.6 units/km^{2}). The racial makeup of the city was 94.7% White, 1.1% African American, 0.5% Native American, 0.7% Asian, 0.7% from other races, and 2.2% from two or more races. Hispanic or Latino of any race were 2.8% of the population.

There were 1,871 households, of which 48.0% had children under the age of 18 living with them, 49.9% were married couples living together, 13.0% had a female householder with no husband present, 8.6% had a male householder with no wife present, and 28.6% were non-families. 20.6% of all households were made up of individuals, and 6.3% had someone living alone who was 65 years of age or older. The average household size was 2.81 and the average family size was 3.23.

The median age in the city was 28.4 years. 32.8% of residents were under the age of 18; 8.4% were between the ages of 18 and 24; 36.9% were from 25 to 44; 15.4% were from 45 to 64; and 6.5% were 65 years of age or older. The gender makeup of the city was 50.4% male and 49.6% female.

=== 2000 census ===
As of the census of 2000, there were 2,324 people, 816 households, and 576 families living in the city. The population density was 1,095.3 inhabitants per square mile (422.9/km^{2}). There were 834 housing units at an average density of 393.1 units per square mile (151.8 units/km^{2}). The racial makeup of the city was 97.46% White, 0.56% African American, 0.65% Native American, 0.26% Asian, 0.04% Pacific Islander, 0.09% from other races, and 0.95% from two or more races. Hispanic or Latino of any race were 0.90% of the population.

There were 816 households, out of which 48.7% had children under the age of 18 living with them, 49.6% were married couples living together, 16.2% had a female householder with no husband present, and 29.3% were non-families. 22.8% of all households were made up of individuals, and 8.5% had someone living alone who was 65 years of age or older. The average household size was 2.84 and the average family size was 3.31.

In the city, the population was spread out, with 35.8% under the age of 18, 9.6% from 18 to 24, 35.3% from 25 to 44, 11.8% from 45 to 64, and 7.6% who were 65 years of age or older. The median age was 28 years. For every 100 females, there were 97.8 males. For every 100 females age 18 and over, there were 85.5 males.

The median income for a household in the city was $43,587, and the median income for a family was $46,842. Males had a median income of $35,590 versus $25,081 for females. The per capita income for the city was $16,662. About 7.9% of families and 8.0% of the population were below the poverty line, including 9.9% of those under age 18 and 16.4% of those age 65 or over.

== Sports ==
The Minnesota Owls were a Tier III junior hockey team based in Isanti. It played in the Minnesota Junior Hockey League for over 20 seasons.

== Infrastructure ==
=== Transportation ===
- Minnesota State Highway 65
- Isanti County Road 5
- Isanti County Road 23

== Notable people ==
- Blake Bjorklund, Racing driver
- Grace McCallum, Olympic artistic gymnast

== Gallery ==
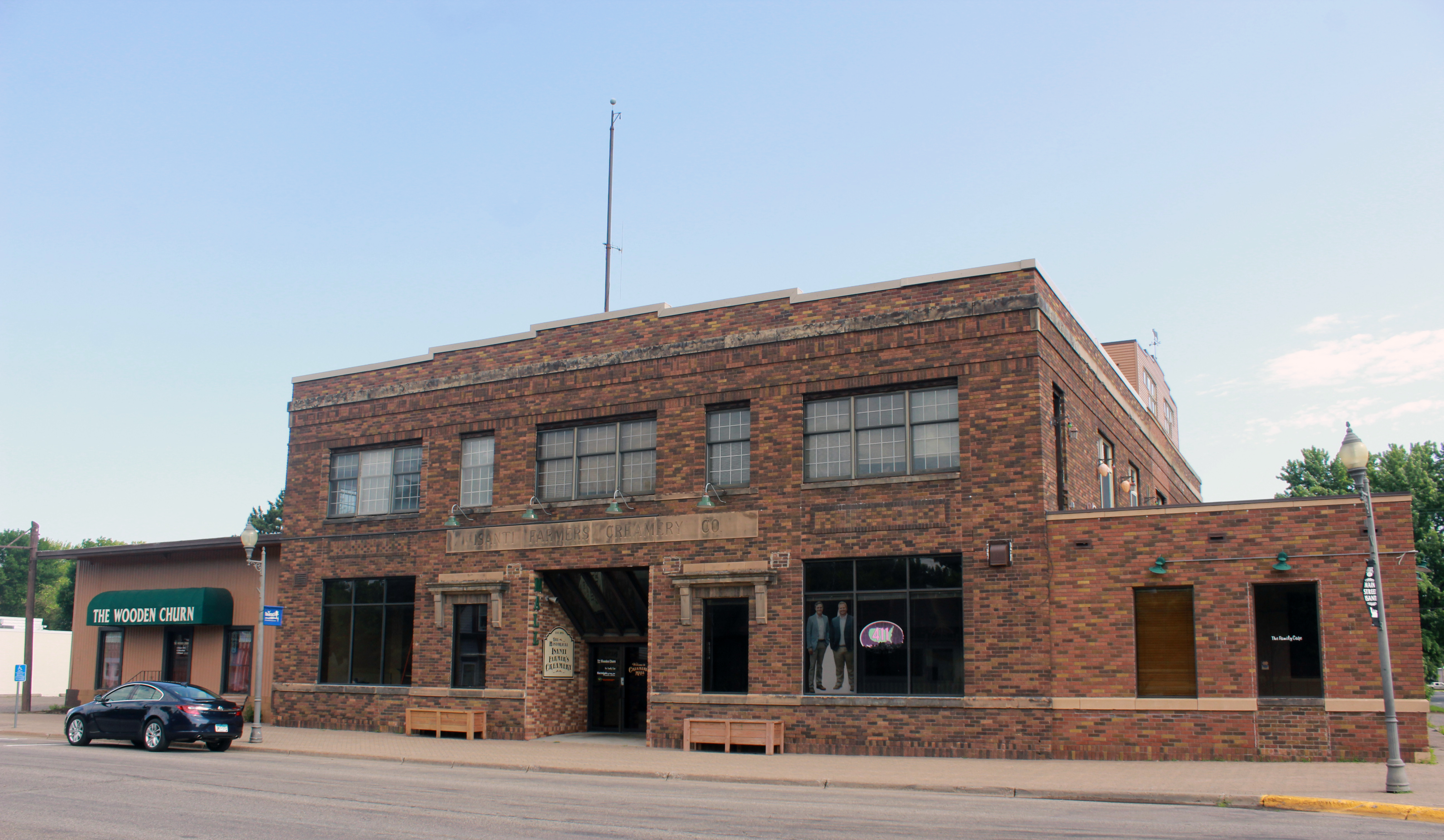
Isanti Farmers Creamery Company building

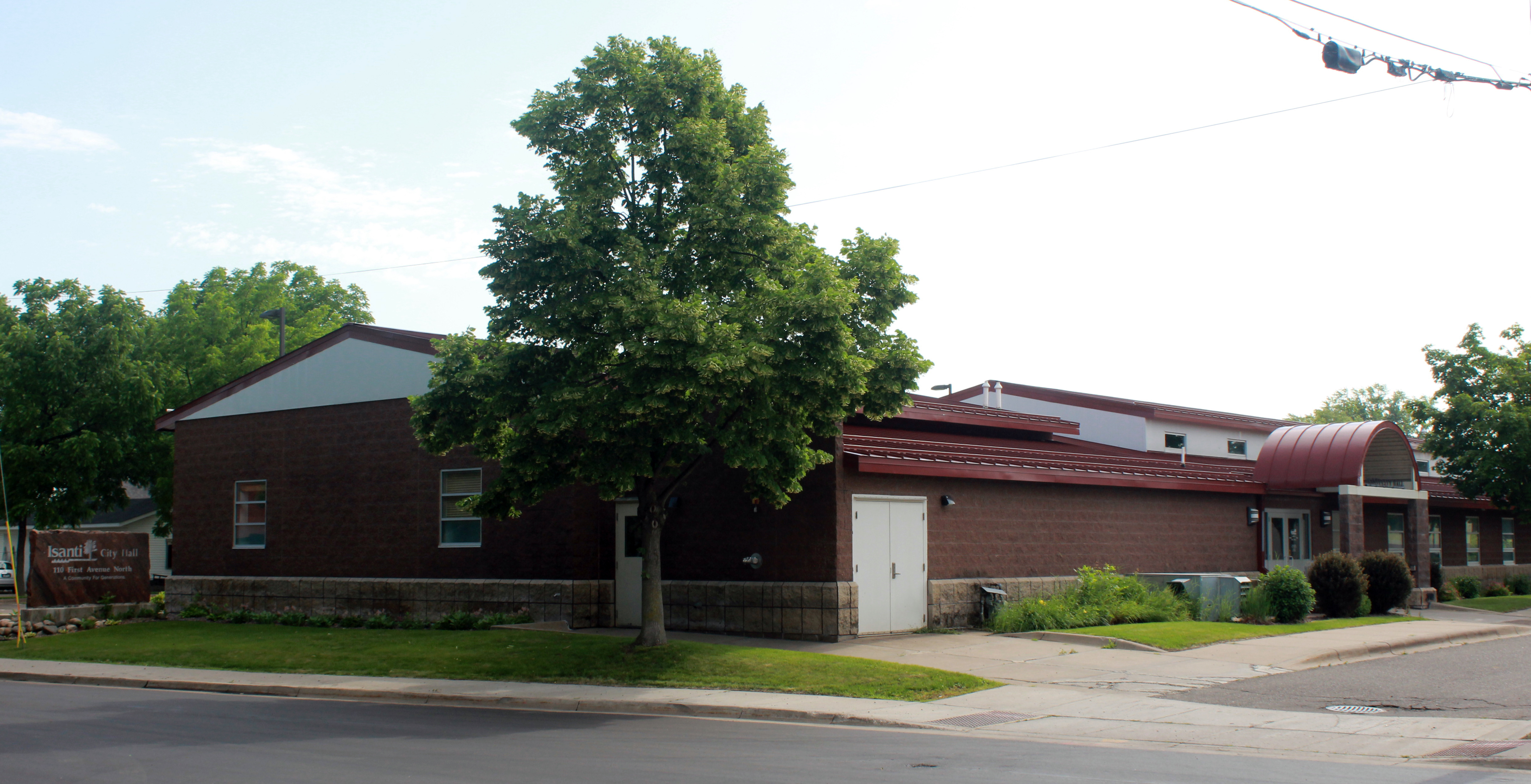
City Hall

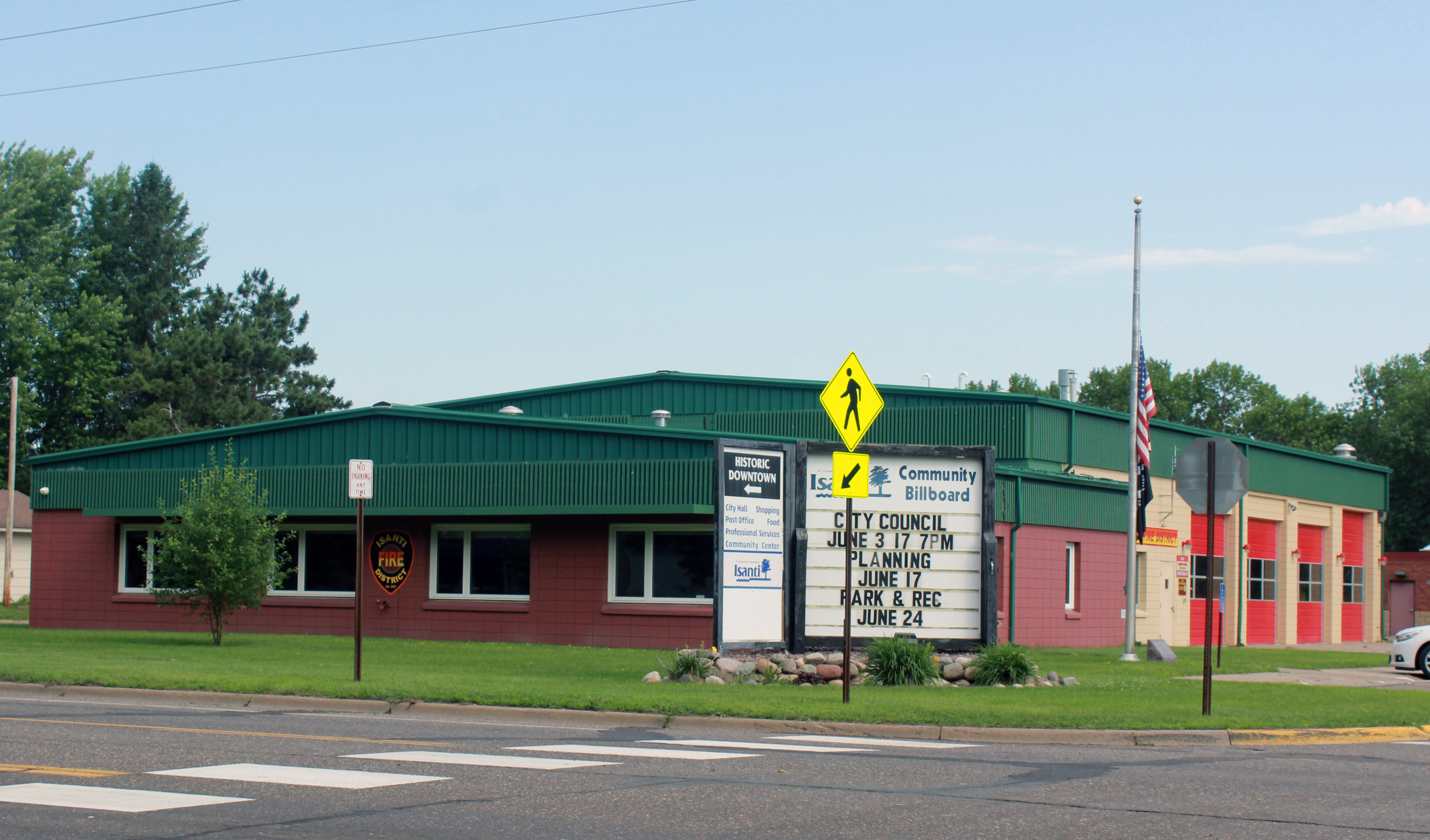
Fire Station

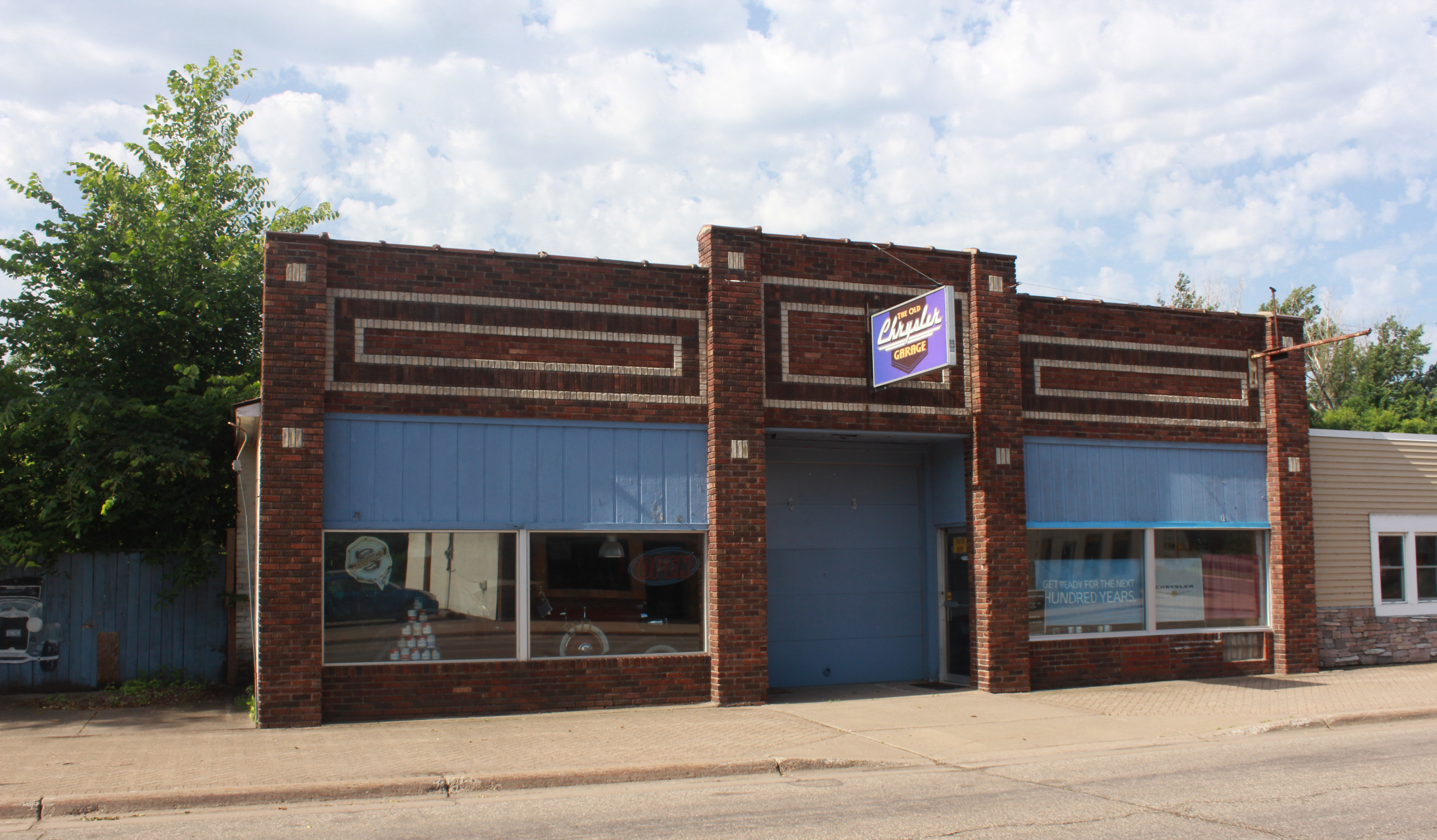
Old Chrysler Garage, museum

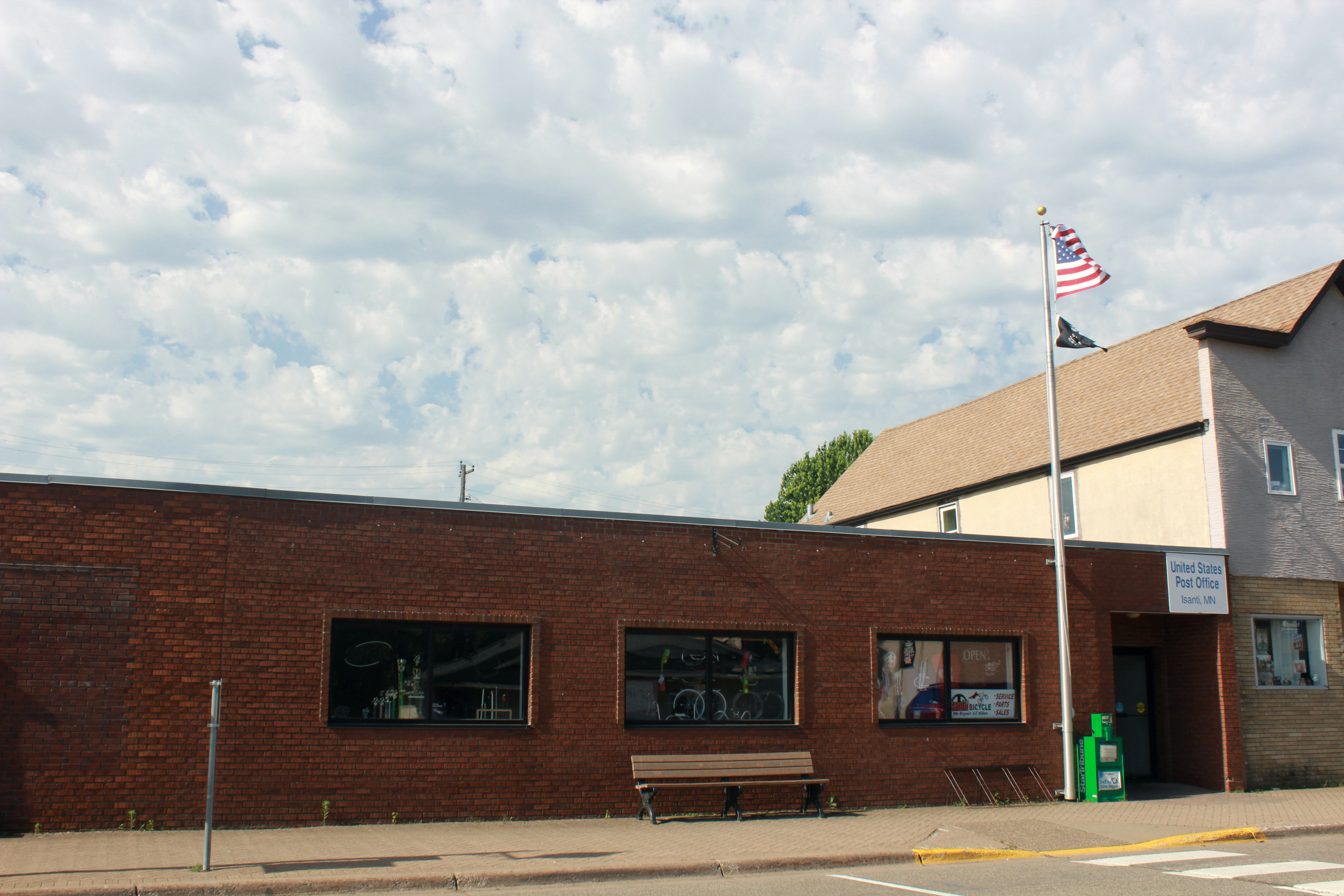
U.S. Post Office
