= Area code 763 =

Area code in Minnesota, United States

Coordinates: 45°16′N 93°32′W

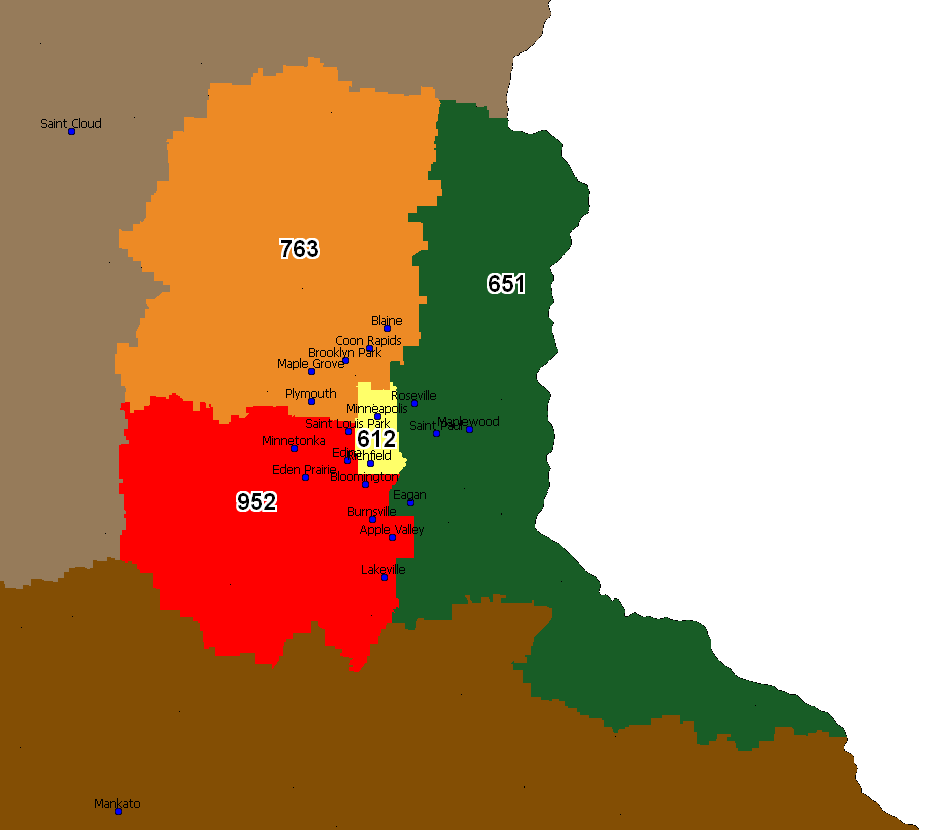
Metropolitan area codes with 763 in orange.

Minnesota area codes.

Area code 763 is a telephone area code in the North American Numbering Plan for the northwestern suburbs of Minneapolis-St. Paul, Minnesota, including cities such as Plymouth, Maple Grove, and Brooklyn Park. It was created in 2000 along with area code 952 (southwest suburbs) when they were split out of numbering plan area 612, which was reduced to the city of Minneapolis and a few inner-ring locales.

763 is bordered on the north and west by area code 320, on the east by area code 651, and by area codes 952 and 612 to the south and southeast respectively.

== History ==
When the American Telephone and Telegraph Company (AT&T) created the first nationwide telephone numbering plan for Operator Toll Dialing in 1947 to automate and speed the connection of long-distance calls, the United States and Canada were divided into 86 geographic numbering plan areas (NPAs) and assigned the original North American area codes. Minnesota was divided into a south-eastern area including the Twin Cities with area code 612 and the rest of the state in the south-west and north with area code 218. In 1954, the southern half of 612 was designated a separate numbering plan area with area code 507 as the third area code for the state, while 612 was rotated out to cover most of central Minnesota as well as the Twin Cities.

Due to the proliferation of cell phones and pagers in the 1990s, the Twin Cities were running out of central office codes for expansion of the numbering plan. In 1996, 612 was divided to create area code 651 for St. Paul and the area east of the Twin Cities. In 1998, the northwestern part of the NPA was split off to area code 320. To mitigate continuing exhaustion, the Minneapolis Public Utilities Commission approved a three-way area code split of the remainder of NPA 612, for which the North American Numbering Plan Administration (NANPA) assigned new area codes 763 and 952 on November 29, 1999.

The area code split took effect on February 27, 2000, and placed the following communities, all suburbs to the north and northwest of Minneapolis, into the 763 numbering plan area, including Brooklyn Center, Fridley, Mounds View, Blaine, Coon Rapids, Circle Pines, Lexington, St. Francis, Isanti, Cambridge, Princeton, Elk River, Becker, Monticello, Buffalo, Waverly, Delano, Medina, Plymouth and Golden Valley.

Despite the three-way split of NPA 612, most of the Twin Cities remained a single rate center shared between all area codes. Likewise, several central offices have their single prefix assignment shared in multiple area codes, so that the area codes split along municipal, rather than exchange area boundaries. As a result, the Twin Cities comprise one of the largest local calling areas in the United States; with a few exceptions, no long-distance charges are applied from one part of the Twin Cities to another. Portions of area codes 320 and 507 are local calls from the Twin Cities as well.

Despite the Twin Cities' rapid growth, 763 is nowhere near exhaustion. The April 2023 NANPA projections estimate an exhaust date of 2075.

== Service area ==
- Albertville
- Andover
- Anoka
- Becker
- Big Lake
- Blaine
- Brooklyn Center
- Brooklyn Park
- Buffalo
- Cambridge
- Champlin
- Circle Pines
- Columbia Heights
- Coon Rapids
- Corcoran
- Crystal
- Dayton
- Delano
- East Bethel
- Elk River
- Fridley
- Golden Valley
- Greenfield
- Ham Lake
- Hanover
- Hilltop
- Independence
- Isanti
- Lino Lakes
- Maple Grove
- Maple Plain
- Medicine Lake
- Medina
- Monticello
- Montrose
- Mounds View
- New Hope
- Oak Grove
- Osseo
- Plymouth
- Princeton
- Ramsey
- Robbinsdale
- Rockford
- Rogers
- St. Francis
- St. Michael
- Spring Lake Park
- Zimmerman

== See also ==
- List of Minnesota area codes
- List of North American Numbering Plan area codes

Minnesota area codes: 218, 320, 507/924, 612, 651, 763, 952
	North: 320	
West: 320	763	East: 612, 651
	South: 612, 952	
