= List of county roads in Anoka County, Minnesota =

- Standard county road markers

Highway names
- Interstates: Interstate X (I-X)
- US Highways: U.S. Highway X (US X)
- State: Trunk Highway X (MN X or TH X)
- County State-Aid Highways: County State-Aid Highway X (CSAH X)
- County Roads: County Road X (CR X)

System links
- County roads of Minnesota; Anoka County

The following is a list of county-maintained roads in Anoka County, Minnesota, United States. Many routes in this list are also county-state-aid-highways (CSAH.)

== CR 1–CR 25 ==
County Road 1 runs from County Road 14 (East Main Street) in Anoka, then follows 5th Avenue, East River Road and Coon Rapids Boulevard into Coon Rapids. It splits with County Road 3 further east in the city, then follows East River Road through Fridley parallel to the Mississippi River. It then proceeds south to the Hennepin County line, where it continues as Hennepin County Road 23. The route runs concurrently with the Great River Road from its southern terminus to Interstate 694. County Road 1 is 14.29 miles (23 km) in length.

County Road 2 is a route in southern Anoka County that begins at an intersection with County 1, then follows 44th Avenue NE, Main Street NE, 40th Avenue NE and Reservoir Boulevard to the Ramsey County line, where it turns into Ramsey County Road 15. County Road 2 is 3.433 miles (5.525 km) in length.

County Road 3 runs from an interchange with County Road 1 in Coon Rapids and follows Coon Rapids Boulevard, County Road 10, and University Avenue to MN 47 in Blaine, near the Northtown Mall.

County Road 4 begins at the intersection of Anoka County Road 2 and Ramsey County Road 15 at the border between Anoka County and Ramsey County. It follows Stinson Boulevard to 49th Avenue Northeast and follows it west to the intersection of County Road 104 and MN 47. It is located in Columbia Heights for its entire length. County Road 4 is 1.98 miles (3.19 km) in length.

County Road 5 begins at County Road 24 in Nowthen. It goes south-east and continues into Ramsey, where it ends at MN 47. County Road 5 is 10.415 miles (16.761 km) in length.

County Road 6 begins at East River Road (County 1) in Fridley. It goes as Mississippi Street until Central Ave (County 35) and goes southbound with County Road 35 until Rice Creek Road, where it turns east-bound and remains so until the Ramsey County line, becoming Ramsey County Road 11. County Road 6 is 2.53 miles (4.07 km) in length.

County Road 7 begins at Main Street (County 14) in Anoka. It proceeds north of US-10 and MN-47, and enters Andover. In Andover, it turns to the west on 165th Avenue Northwest, then turns north onto Roanoke Street. At County Road 27, it becomes Rum River Boulevard. It ends in St. Francis at County Road 24. The route used to go further south to East River Road (County 1.) County Road 7 is 13.87 miles (22.32 km) in length.

County Road 8 begins at East River Road (County 1) in Fridley. It follows Osborne Road to Central Avenue (County 35.) It has a concurrency with County 35 until 73rd Avenue Northeast, where it turns to the east. Then it ends at the Ramsey County line where it continues as Ramsey County Road H2. Between MN 47 and County Road 35, County Road 8 runs on the border of Fridley and Spring Lake Park. County Road 8 is 2.77 miles (4.46 km) in length.

County Road 9 begins at Main Street (County 14) in Coon Rapids. It follows Round Lake Boulevard to County Road 58 near Oak Grove and Andover, where Round Lake Boulevard turns into Lake George Boulevard. It passes through Oak Grove and ends in St. Francis at County Road 24. County Road 9 is 13.429 miles (21.612 km) in length.

County Road 10 goes from the intersection of MN-47 and County Road 3 / Coon Rapids Boulevard to the Ramsey County line, where it continues as Ramsey County Road 10. The route was part of the old alignment of US 10. County Road 10 is 2.576 miles (4.146 km) in length.

County Road 11 begins at East River Road (County 1) and MN-610. It follows Foley Boulevard north to Northdale Boulevard, where it turns to the west (pictured.) It has a brief concurrency with Hanson Boulevard (County Road 78,) before continuing to its endpoint at Crooked Lake Boulevard (County 18.) County Road 11 is 6.303 miles (10.144 km) in length.

County Road 12 begins at County Road 11 as Northdale Boulevard in Coon Rapids. It goes to University Avenue (County 51) and turns into 109th Avenue Northeast in Blaine. It has a brief concurrency with Sunset Avenue (County 53) before entering Lino Lakes. It then ends at Lake Drive (County 23.) County Road 12 is 8.22 miles (13.23 km) in length.

County Road 13 is a route in northern Anoka County. Its southern terminus is at County Road 22 in Oak Grove. It then proceeds north until it reaches the eastern terminus of County Road 103, where it turns to the east briefly. It then proceeds north to County Road 24 and County Road 73, which is the route's northern terminus. County Road 13 is 6.39 miles (10.28 km) in length.

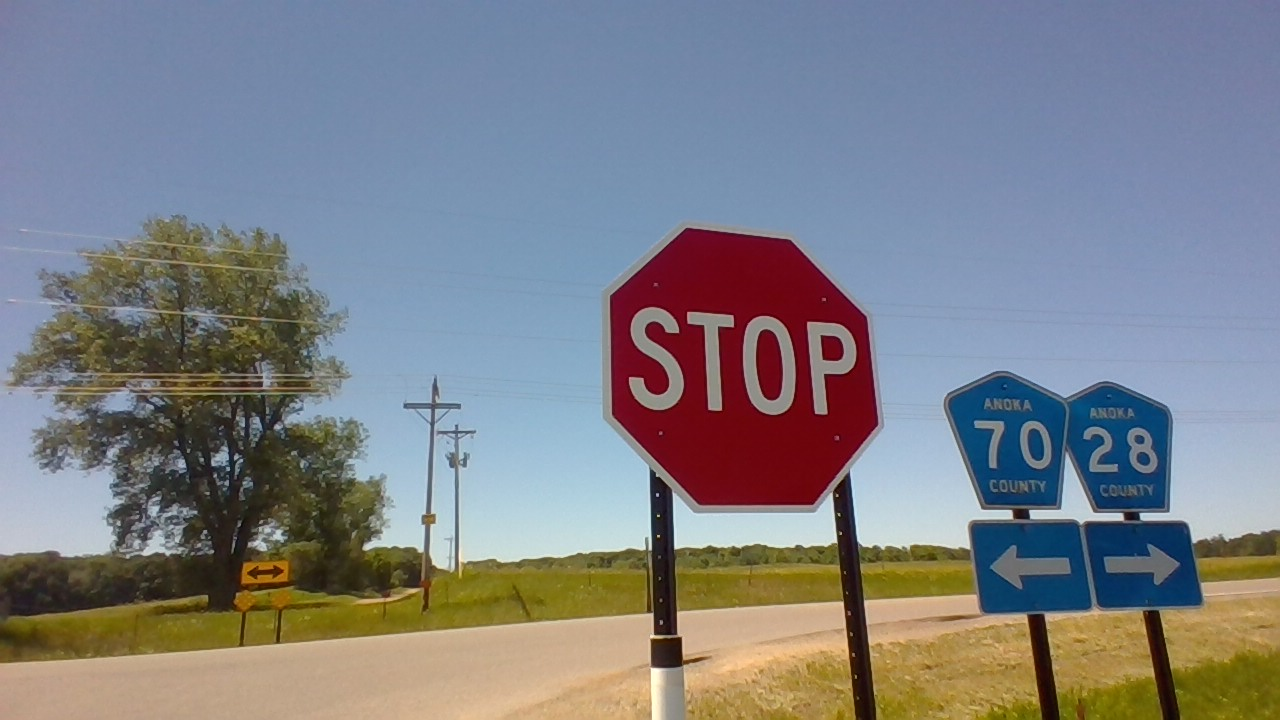
A split where 28 goes to Isanti County and 70 goes to Nowthen

County Road 14 is a major route in southern Anoka County. It begins at 5th Avenue (County Road 1) at its western terminus in Anoka. The route follows Main Street into Coon Rapids before turning into 125th Avenue Northeast in Blaine. It switches back to Main Street in Lino Lakes. It follows Main Street to the Washington County line, where it continues as Washington County Road 8. 5.2 miles of the route used to be Minnesota State Highway 242, until 2007. County Road 14 is 19.549 miles (31.461 km) in length.

County Road 15 (non-CSAH) begins at County 22 and County 68 in East Bethel. It runs concurrent with County Road 74 and then goes northbound to County Road 26.

County Road 16 (non-CSAH) is Andover Boulevard from County Road 78 (Hanson Boulevard) in Andover to MN-65 in Ham Lake.

County Road 17 is a major route in eastern Anoka County. Its southern terminus is at Ramsey County Road 51 and Anoka County Road 32 in Blaine. It follows Lexington Avenue to 197th Avenue Northeast in Columbus, where it turns to the west and follows 197th Avenue to Viking Boulevard (County 22) where it ends at its northern terminus. County Road 17 is 16.394 miles (26.384 km) in length.

County Road 18 is made up of two disjoint sections. The first section is located entirely in Coon Rapids and runs from County Road 1 (Coon Rapids Boulevard) to County Road 11 (Northdale Boulevard.) The second section runs from Main Street (County 14) to the Washington County line where it turns into Washington County Road 2. County Road 18 is 21.7 miles (34.9 km) in length.

County Road 19 (non-CSAH) is a rural road that runs through Columbus from Lake Drive (County 23) to Broadway Avenue (County 18.). County Road 19 is 3.2 miles in length.

County Road 20 begins at 7th Avenue (County 7) in Andover. It follows 157th Avenue North to Round Lake Boulevard (County 9,) then follows 161st Avenue Northwest to County Road 18 and County Road 60. County Road 20 is 4.982 miles (8.018 km) in length.

County Road 21 is a route in Centerville and Lino Lakes, which runs from County Road 14 (Main Street) to the Ramsey County line, where it continues as Ramsey County Road 59. County Road 21 is 2.81 miles (4.52 km) in length.

County Road 22 is a major route in northern Anoka County. The road begins at the border between Elk River and Nowthen at Sherburne County Road 12. It follows 181st Avenue Northwest to Baugh Street at an intersection with County Roads 83 and 64. Then the route turns to the north until it intersects County Road 65. Then the road follows Viking Boulevard through Oak Grove, East Bethel, and Linwood Township, before continuing into Chisago County as Chisago County Road 22. County Road 22 is 29.276 miles (47.115 km) in length.

County Road 23 follows Lake Drive and Naples Street from the interchange of MN 97 and I-35 to County Road 32 (County J.) It runs diagonally across the eastern half of Anoka County. County Road 23 is 13.138 miles (21.144 km) in length.

County Road 24 is a route in north Anoka County that runs from Isanti County Road 12 at the Isanti County line to the Sherburne County line, where it turns into Sherburne County Road 13. County Road 24 is 19.415 miles (31.245 km) in length.

== CR 26–CR 50 ==
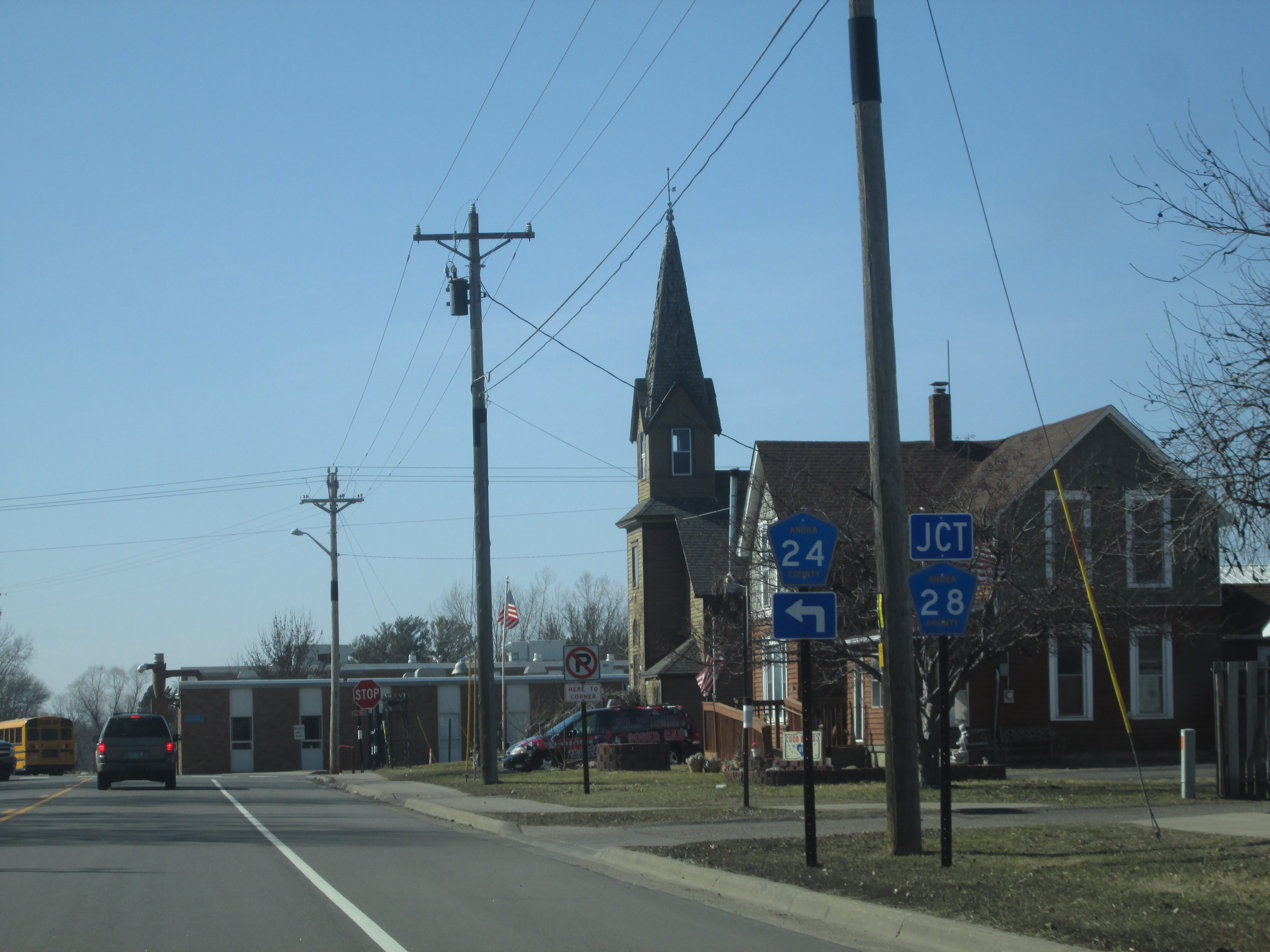
Intersection of Anoka CSAH 24 and CSAH 28 in St. Francis

County Road 26 is a route that runs from County Road 85 in Linwood Township to County Road 24 in East Bethel. County Road 26 is 6.54 miles (10.53 km) in length.

County Road 27 (non-CSAH) is a route in Ramsey that runs from County 7 (Rum River Boulevard) to MN 47 (Saint Francis Boulevard.)

County Road 28 begins at County Road 24 in St. Francis. The route continues past MN 47 and proceeds to County Road 70, where it turns to the north and continues into Isanti County as Isanti County Road 7. County Road 28 is 5.695 miles (9.165 km) in length.

County Road 30 begins at MN-47 (N Ferry Street.) It continues east to 4th Avenue (County 31,) and turns into Pierce Street. It ends at 7th Avenue (County 7.) County Road 30 is 0.58 miles (0.93 km) in length.

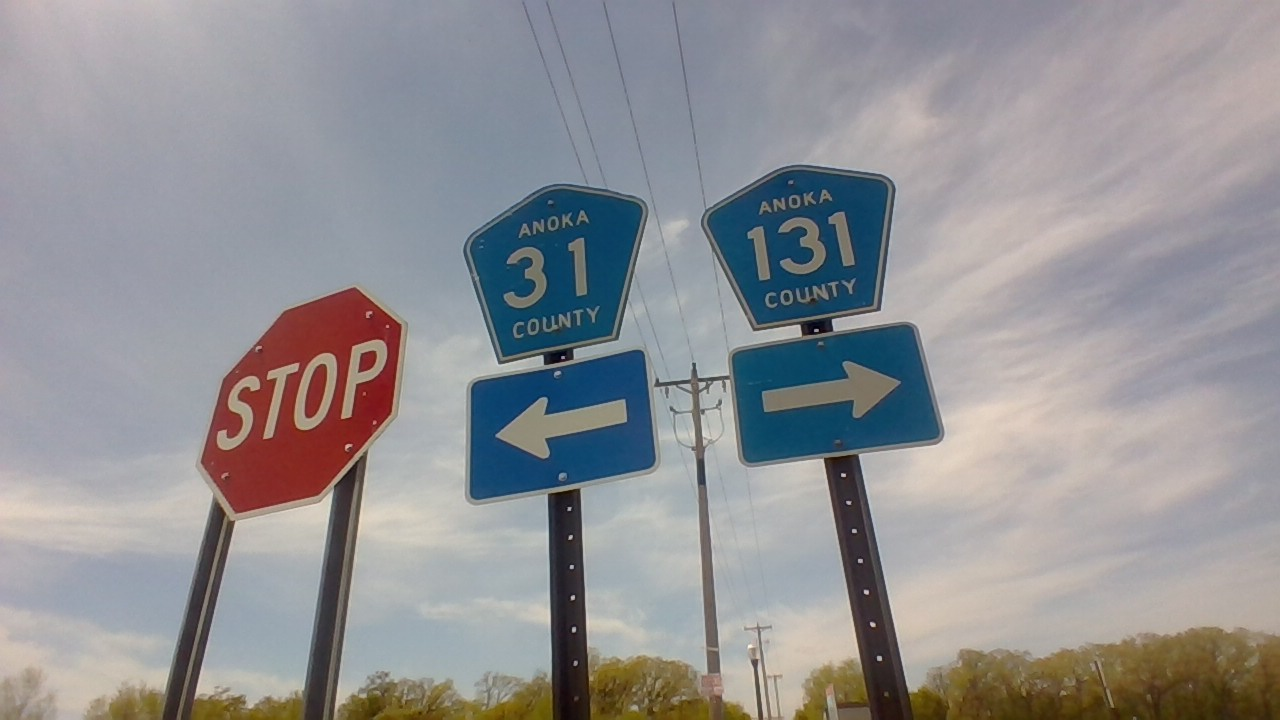
Signs for 31 and 131

County Road 31 begins at East Main Street in Anoka. It follows 4th Avenue north and crosses under US-10. It then turns east on Grant Street at CR 131 and ends at 7th Avenue (County Road 7.) County Road 31 is 1.212 miles (1.951 km) in length.

County Road 32 begins at MN-65 in Blaine. It is also known as County Road J throughout its route, until it briefly turns north at the North Oaks Farm fields in Southeastern Lino Lakes. The rest of its pathway is entirely in Lino Lakes, to its end at Centerville Road. It crosses US-10 and I-35W along the way, before ending at Centerville Road (County 21.)

County Road 34 is Birch Street from County Road 49 (Hodgson Road) to County Road 54 (20th Avenue) in Lino Lakes.

County Road 35 begins at MN-65 near Moore Lake as Central Avenue. The road ends at County Road 10, near the Ramsey County line. County Road 35 is 4.034 miles (6.492 km) in length.

County Road 36 is a route in north-east Anoka County that runs from Isanti County Road 18 at the Isanti County line to Chisago County Road 19 at the Chisago County line. County Road 36 is 2.09 miles (3.36 km) in length.

County Road 49 is a route that runs from County 17 (Lexington Avenue) to the Ramsey County line, where it continues as Ramsey County Road 49. Before 1998, the route was part of old MN 49.

== CR 51–CR 75 ==

County Road 51 is University Avenue from County Road 10 / County Road 3 to County Road 14. It is the road that borders Coon Rapids and Blaine.

County Road 52 begins at Lexington Avenue (County 17.) It follows Lovell Road, 95th Avenue, and 101st Avenue, until turning into Radisson Road. The route continues north to 153rd Avenue Northeast (County 61.)

County Road 53 (non-CSAH) is Sunset Avenue in Blaine from North Road (County 49) to 125th Avenue North (County 14.)

County Road 54 is a route in eastern Anoka County that runs from an interchange with County Road J near Interstate 35E, to County 23 (Lake Drive) near an interchange with Interstate 35, near State Hwy 97.

County Road 56 is a Ramsey Boulevard in Ramsey from US 10 / US 169 to County 5 (Nowthen Boulevard.)

County Road 57 is a route in Ramsey that runs from US 10 / US 169 to County 5.

County Road 58 is a route located mostly in Andover and Oak Grove that runs from County 7 (7th Avenue) to County 18 (Crosstown Boulevard.)

County Road 59 (non-CSAH) is a route in Andover that runs from County 20 (161st Avenue North) to County 58 (181st Avenue North.)

County Road 60 (non-CSAH) is a route in Andover and Ham Lake that runs from the intersection of County 18 and County 20 to County 17 (Lexington Avenue.)

County Road 61 (non-CSAH) is a route in Ham Lake that runs from an intersection with the northern terminus of County 52 to County 60.

County Road 62 is Kettle River Boulevard from County 23 near Camp Three Road in Columbus, to the Chisago County line.

County Road 63 (non-CSAH) is Green Valley Road in Ramsey from County 5 to MN 47.

County Road 64 (non-CSAH) is a route in Ramsey that goes from the intersection of County 22 and County 83 to County 5.

County Road 65 begins at County 5 in Nowthen. It goes slightly south to an intersection with County 22, where the route proceeds to the Sherburne County line, where it continues as Sherburne County Road 33.

County Road 66 (non-CSAH) is a route in Nowthen that begins at MN 47 and proceeds north past County 22, where it ends at County 24.

County Road 67 (non-CSAH) was a county route in Oak Grove that began at Viking Boulevard (County 22) and ended at 181st Ave (County 58). The route parallels BNSF Railway's Hinckley Subdivision.

County Road 68 (non-CSAH) is a route in Ham Lake and East Bethel that runs from Crosstown Boulevard (County 18) to Viking Boulevard (County 22.) The route is known locally as Xylite Street and Greenbrook Drive.

County Road 70 (non-CSAH) begins at County 24 near the Sherburne County line. It proceeds north-east to County 28.

County Road 71 (non-CSAH) is a route located mostly in Saint Francis. It begins at County 24, and proceeds to the Isanti County line, where it becomes Isanti County Road 71.

County Road 72 (non-CSAH) has two sections. They both start at County 24 in Saint Francis. The two sections merge and continue into Isanti County.

County Road 73 (non-CSAH) is a route in Bethel and East Bethel that begins at the intersection of County 24 and County 13. The route proceeds north into Isanti County.

County Road 74 (non-CSAH) serves Oak Grove, East Bethel, and Linwood Township. It begins at County 13 and proceeds past MN 65 and ends at County 22 near Linwood Lake.

County Road 75 (non-CSAH) is a route in Linwood Township that runs from County 22 to an intersection with the western terminus of County 77.

== CR 76–CR 100 ==
County Road 76 serves East Bethel and Linwood Township. The route follows Fawn Lake Drive from County 24 at the border with Isanti County to County 36.

County Road 77 (non-CSAH) runs from the northern terminus of County 75 to the border with the Chisago County line, where it ends at County 36.

County Road 78 begins at Viking Boulevard (County 22) in Oak Grove. It follows Flamingo Street until County 58 (181st Avenue,) where it turns into Hanson Boulevard. It continues into Andover and it enters Coon Rapids on the west side of Bunker Hills Regional Park, where it has a brief concurrency with County Road 11, and crosses US-10 / MN-47. It ends at Coon Rapids Boulevard (County 1) near the Coon Rapids Dam. County Road 78 is 11.097 miles (17.859 km) in length.

County Road 79 (non-CSAH) was a former route in Anoka and Coon Rapids that ran from County 7 to County 9.

County Road 81 (non-CSAH) was a county route in Saint Francis that ran from MN 47 to County 28.

County Road 82 (non-CSAH) begins at County Road 65 in Nowthen. The route follows Tiger Street to 205th Avenue North, where it turns to the west. It then proceeds to the Sherburne County line, where it becomes Sherburne County Road 34.

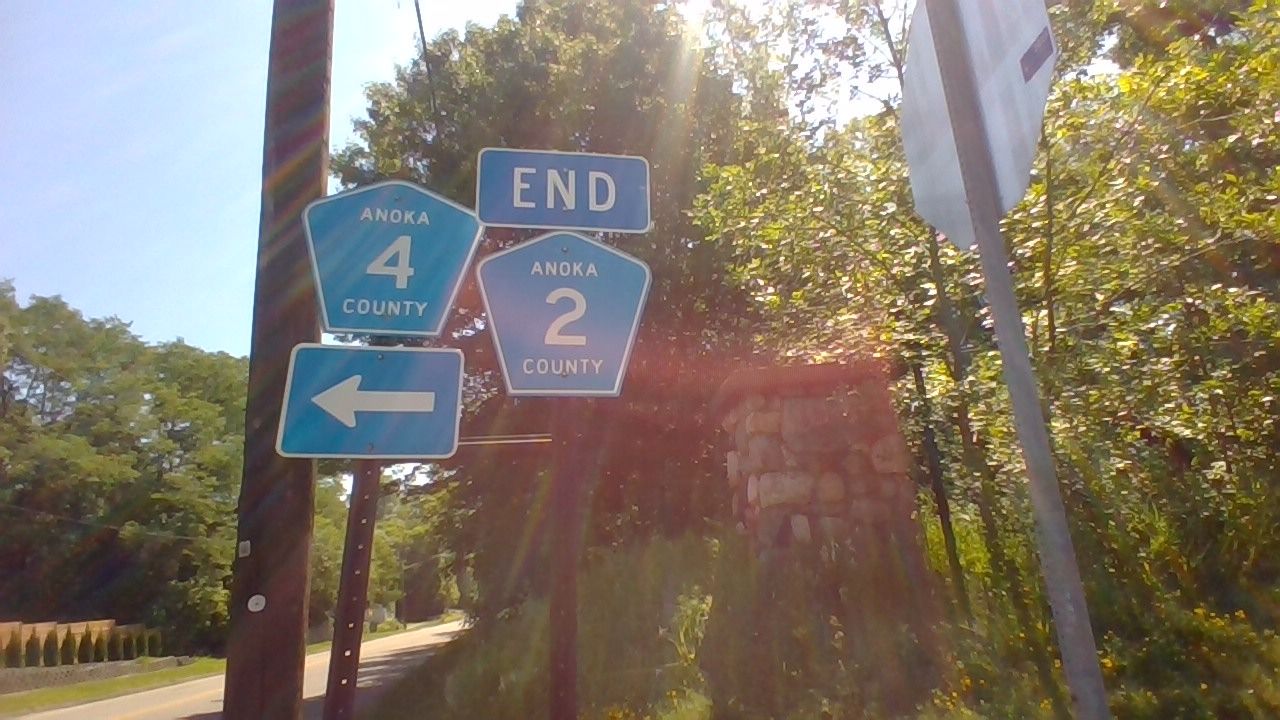
(CSAH) 2 ends and 4 begins

County Road 83 is a route in western Anoka County that goes through Ramsey. It begins at County Road 22 and County Road 64, and follows Baugh Street to Armstrong Boulevard, and then proceeds to US-10 and US-169, where a new interchange was constructed in late 2015.

County Road 84 (non-CSAH) is a route in Lino Lakes, which runs from County Road 14 (Main Street) to the Ramsey County line, where it continues as Ramsey County Road 60. It is known locally as Otter Lake Road.

County Road 85 is a route that serves Linwood Township. Its southern terminus is at County Road 22 (Viking Boulevard,) and the route goes through Martin Lake before ending at its northern terminus at County Road 76 (Fawn Lake Drive.)

County Road 86 (non-CSAH) serves Oak Grove and East Bethel. The route runs from County 13 to MN 65.

County Road 87 (non-CSAH) was a route in Blaine that ran from MN 65 to Radisson Road (County 52,) along 105th Avenue North near the National Sports Center.

County Road 89 (non-CSAH) is a short route in Nowthen that runs from County 24 to County 70.

== CR 101 and up ==
County Road 102 begins at the intersection of Main Street NE and 44th Avenue North (County 2.) The road continues north to 57th Avenue North, where it turns to the east and ends at MN-47 in Fridley. County Road 102 is 1.85 miles (2.98 km) in length.

County Road 103 (non-CSAH) is a route that runs on the border between Bethel and Oak Grove. Its western terminus is at County Road 24, and its eastern terminus is at County Road 13.

County Road 104 (non-CSAH) is a short stretch of 49th Avenue North that begins at MN-47 and County Road 4 and goes west to County Road 102.

County Road 105 (non-CSAH) was a former county route in Blaine and Lexington that ran from Lake Drive (County 23) to Lovell Road (County 52.)

County Road 106 (non-CSAH) is Mississippi Street from the intersection of County Road 35 and County Road 6 to the Ramsey County line.

County Road 108 (non-CSAH) is Osborne Road from the intersection of County Road 8 and County Road 35 to the Ramsey County line, where it continues as Ramsey County Road I.

County Road 116 is Bunker Lake Boulevard from Armstrong Boulevard (County 83) in Ramsey to Lexington Avenue (County 17) in Ham Lake. The route is named for Bunker Lake, which is south of the road. A portion of the route used to have the designation of County Road 16.

County Road 131 is a short route in Anoka. It begins at County Road 31 and continues north to the Rum River Human Service Center.

County Road 132 (non-CSAH) is a route in Fridley and Coon Rapids. It begins at MN 47 (University Avenue) and continues west to County Road 1 (East River Road.)

County Road 140 (non-CSAH) is a short route beginning at County Road 54 (20th Avenue) in Lino Lakes and continues east to the Washington County line, where it becomes Washington County Road 4A.

County Road 153 was a former county route in Lino Lakes that ran from Sunset Avenue (County 53) to Apollo Drive (County 12.) County Road 153 was 1.321 miles (2.126 km) in length.

County Road 158 (non-CSAH) is a route in Andover that begins at County Road 7 (7th Avenue and 165th Avenue) and proceeds to County Road 58 (Valley Drive.)

County Road 163 (non-CSAH) is a short route that goes through Nowthen. It begins at County Road 22 (Baugh Street) and follows Burns Parkway north-east to County Road 5 (Nowthen Boulevard.) County Road 163 is 2.523 miles (4.060 km) in length.

== See also ==
- County Roads in Minnesota
