= Lake George (Anoka County, Minnesota) =

Lake in Anoka County, Minnesota

- Location within Minnesota

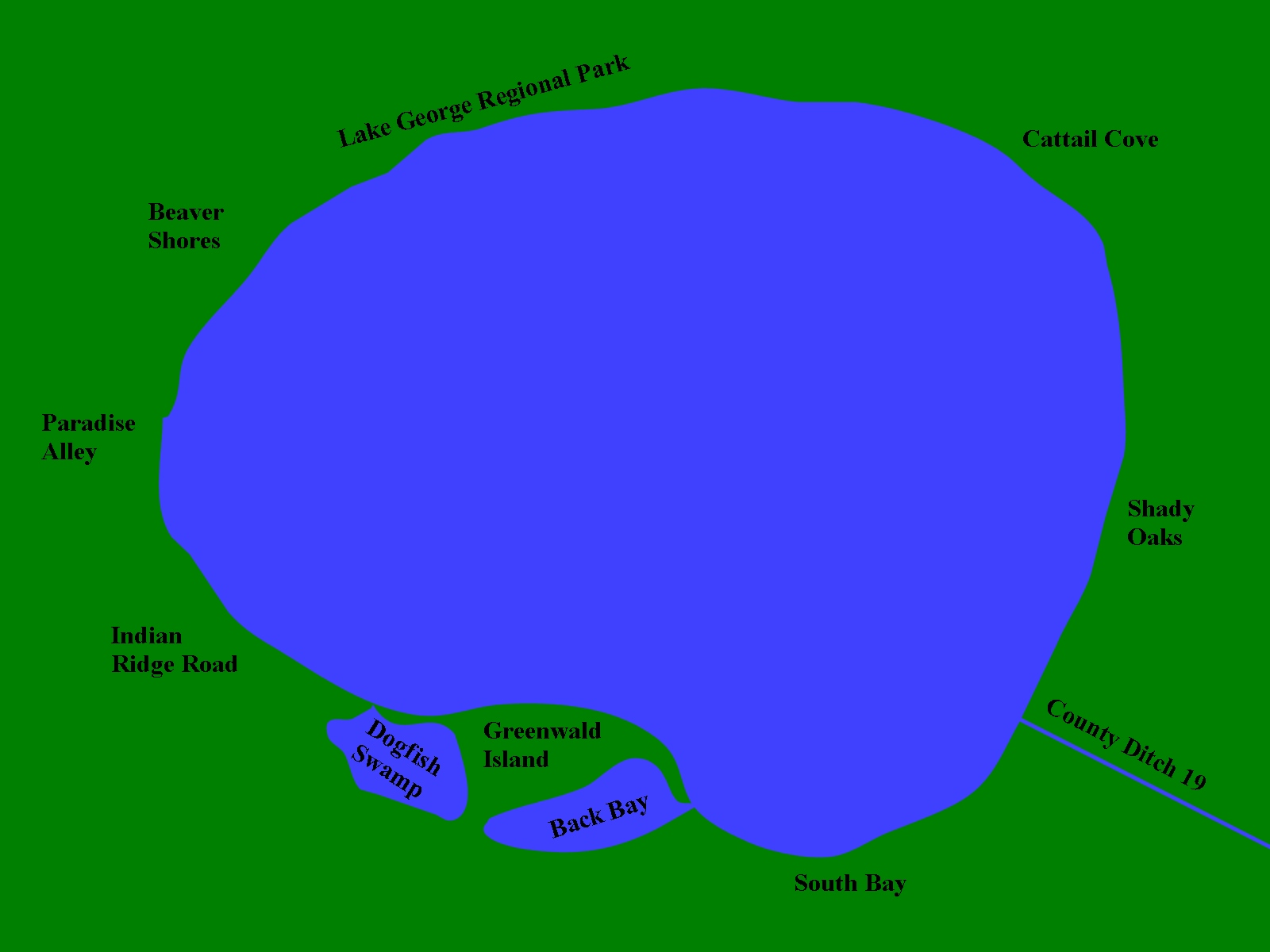
- map
- Location: Oak Grove, Anoka County, Minnesota
- Coordinates: 45°21′25″N 093°20′10″W
- Basin countries: United States
- Max. width: 1 mile (1.6 km)
- Surface area: 495 acres (2.00 km^{2})
- Max. depth: 32 ft (9.8 m)

Lake George is a small lake in Anoka County, Minnesota, located within the city of Oak Grove, 12 miles (19 km) north of the city of Anoka. Minnesota's Department of Natural Resources tracks the lake by the name George and the identifier 02-0091-00. The USGS tracks the lake by the ID 644081 and the coordinates of 45°21′25″N 93°20′10″W.

Roughly circular in shape with two marshes encircling Greenwald Island on the southern shore, Lake George Regional Park covers much of the north shore. The park has picnic areas, a boat launch, and a large roped-off swimming beach. The lake is used during the summer and winter for water skiing, fishing, ice fishing, canoeing, and snowmobiling. With the exception of a few vacant lots, a wetland area in the southeast corner at the lake outlet, a new development on the west end, and county-owned property, there are homes located along the entire lakeshore.

The regions around the lake are known as: Paradise Alley, Beaver Shores, Lake George Regional Park, Cattail Oak, Shady Oak, South Bay, Greenwald Island, and Indian Ridge Road.

== History ==
Lake George was formed about 12,000 years ago following retreat of the Laurentide Ice Sheet and drainage of glacial Lake Anoka. The first recorded mention of the lake comes from an Indian battle which occurred in 1845. The battle followed a peace conference between the Lakota and the Ojibwe at Fort Snelling. Following the conference, the Ojibwe began returning home up the Mississippi River and then up the Rum River, and the Lakota set on their way up the Minnesota River. It is reported that the Ojibwe took a Lakota woman with them, and when the Lakota discovered this they pursued the Ojibway to their camp on the south shore of Lake George. The battle that ensued lasted for three days and resulted in over 200 dead.

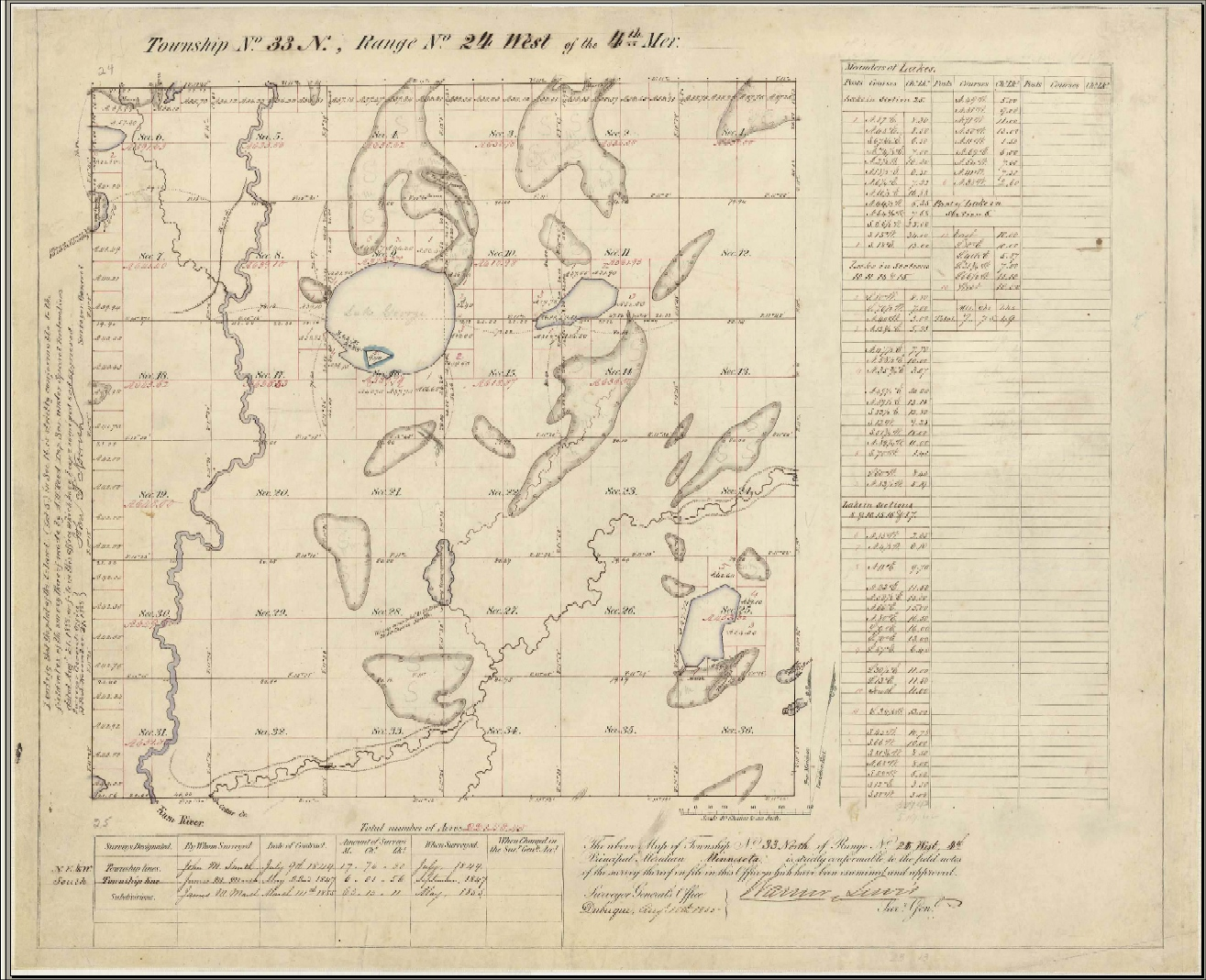
1847 Plat map of Lake George.

In 1847, Federal surveyors established the section and township boundaries as well as locations of Indian burial mounds. The lake is named after George Arbuckle, who was the chief surveyor of the party. The original survey plats of lake George and Greenwald Island were published in 1848.

After the settlement of the area, Lake George began to become popular for urban dwellers looking to find summer recreation. By the turn of the 20th century, many cabins and, just prior to World War I, a few resorts were built. Vacationers first came by rail via the depot in Cedar and later by car. The main resorts on the lake were Hopper's (northwest shore), Yost's (north shore), Tillbergs (now the Shoreside), Day's (later the By George Inn) and Fleet's Inn (north shore near the present-day county beach). It was said that gangsters from nearby St. Paul would hide out in the area to avoid law enforcement in the city. The Chicago mob would occasionally visit them to make business deals.

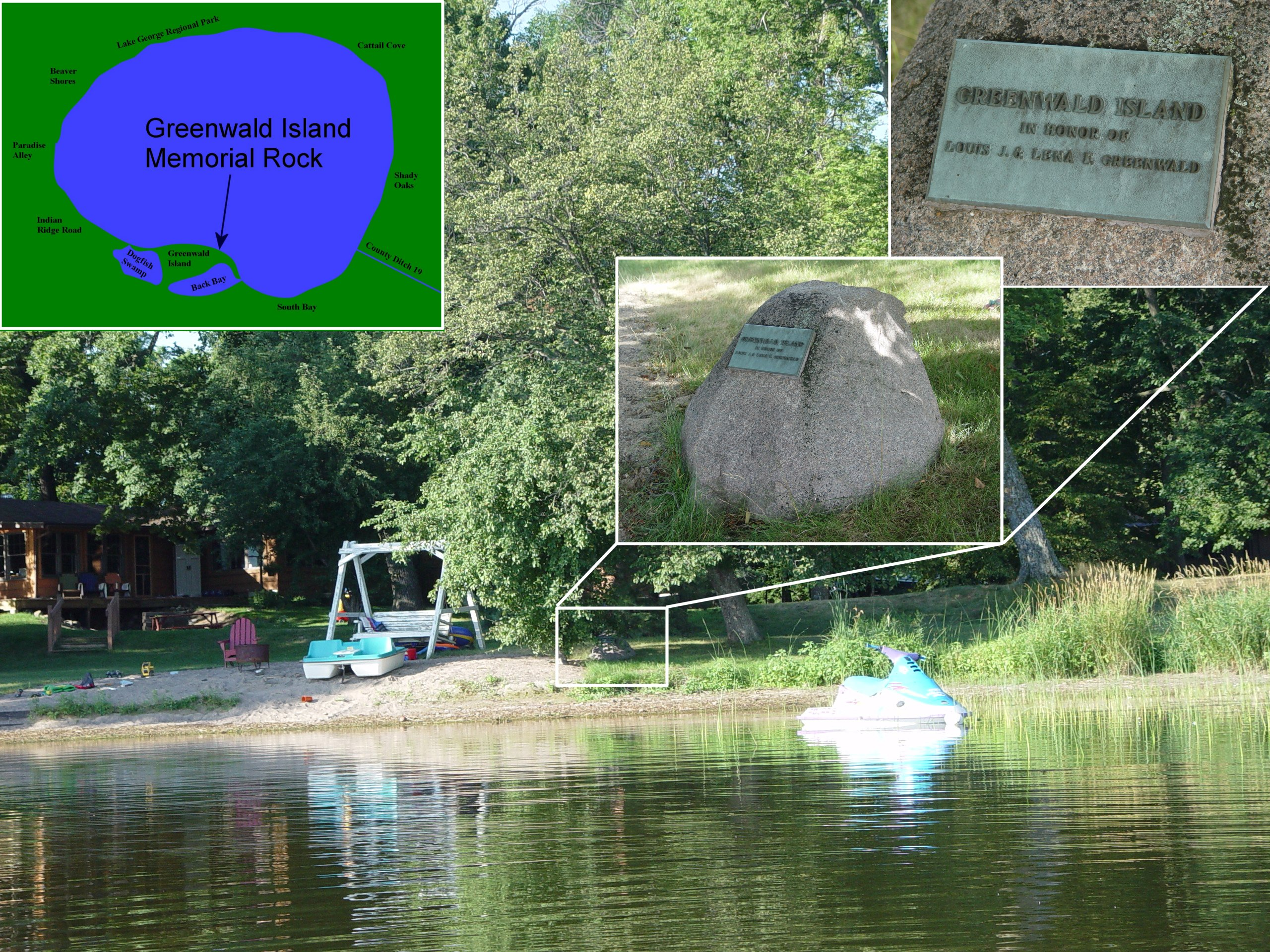
Image and location of Greenwald Island Memorial Rock

Greenwald Island is named after Aaron Greenwald, who was born December 2, 1832, and eventually settled in Anoka where he found work as a miller in one of the local flour mills. Aaron and wife, Ann, had two sons: William born August 8, 1859, and Louis on Oct 10, 1860.

In the late 1930s the Lake George Conservation Club was formed. At the time, most lakeshore residents were seasonal. In the 1970s the face of the lake's neighborhoods began to change, with permanent homes replacing the summer cabins. The club's activities dwindled, until 1981 when an issue regarding horsepower regulation on the lake united the lake's residents and the club was reconstituted. In the summer of 1998, a dead body was found in the lake.

In January 2004, the two marshes were dredged to open a channel.

== Ecology ==
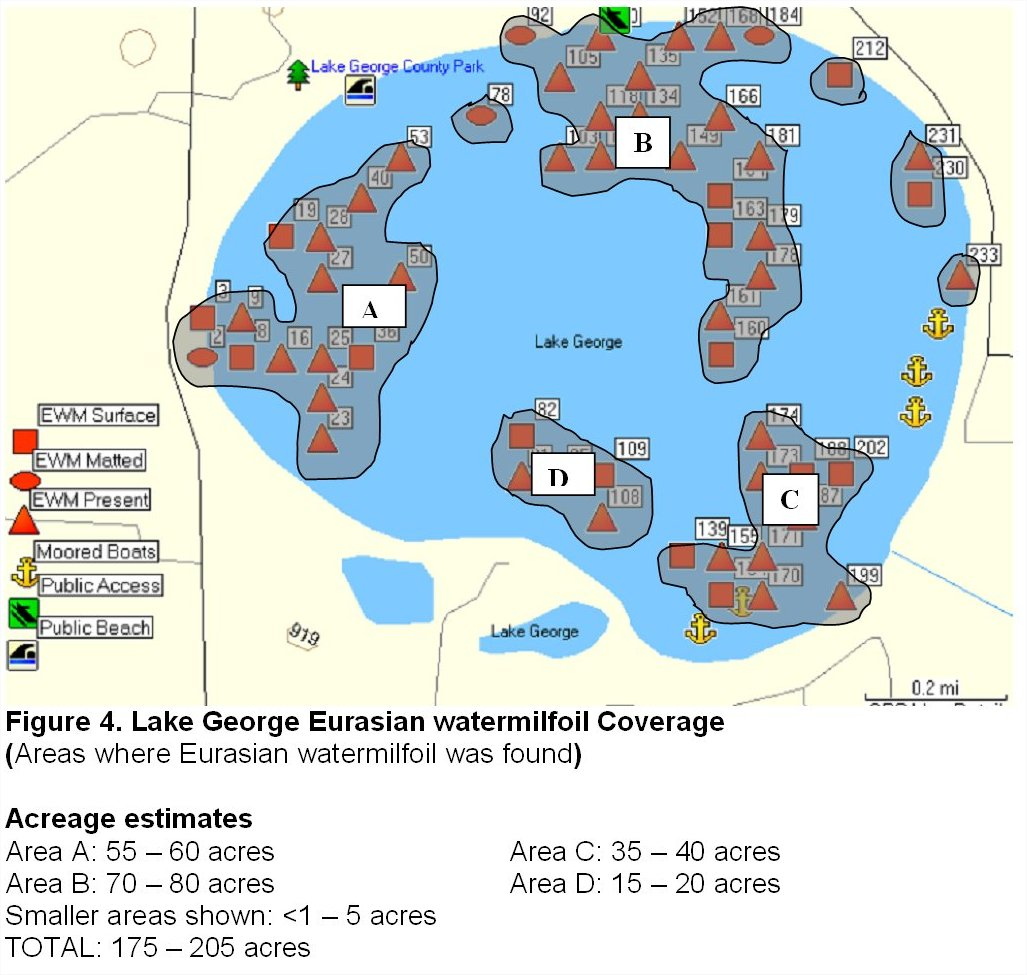
State of milfoil on Lake George as of Aug 2006.

Lake George is 495 acres (2.00 km^{2}) in area with 4.5 miles (7.2 km) of shoreline. It has very good water clarity, with a summer average of 10.5 feet (3.2 m) in 2004. About 391 acres (1.58 km^{2}) (80%) of the lake is classified as littoral (<15’ deep); however, because of the very clear water, plants grow to a deeper depth. The maximum and mean depths are 32 feet (9.8 m) and 5 feet (1.5 m), respectively. Most of the lake has a sandy bottom, but there are areas of soft muddy sediments. Twenty-eight (28) different species of aquatic plant life were found in the lake.

=== Sport fish ===
Lake George is known to have:

- Walleye of unknown abundance and average size. Walleye were first stocked in 2001 and these fish generally become acceptable to Metro-area anglers after their third summer (2004).
- Northern Pike of above average abundance, average size and some larger pike.
- Largemouth Bass of average abundance, all sizes present including some real trophies.
- Bluegill of above average abundance, average size.
- Crappie of above average abundance, average size.

=== Milfoil ===
Invasive Eurasian watermilfoil (Myriophyllum spicatum) was first confirmed in Lake George in 1998 by a DNR biologist, and by the summer of 2006 was forming nuisance mats in large areas of the lake; native plant life and recreational use of the lake are threatened by the spread of the exotic species. In addition to Eurasian watermilfoil, curly-leaf pondweed, another non-native species, has also been found in Lake George.

Because Lake George exhibits very clear conditions, it may be more prone to the spread of milfoil to deeper water. The average Secchi disk transparency from 2000–2005 ranged from 9.0 to 11.5 feet (CLMP data). With the clear water, light can penetrate into deeper waters and promote plant growth beyond the 15’ depth. Milfoil was recorded on the data sheets only if it was found at the survey point.

== Lake improvement district ==
After a majority of the property owners within the proposed Lake George Improvement District filed a petition with Anoka County requesting the establishment of the improvement district, the Oak Grove's City Council unanimously approved the creation of a "Lake Improvement District" (LID) on January 26, 2009. The LID will further extend the efforts of the Lake George Conservation Club to keep the lake clear of invasive weeds. An initial Board was appointed in March 2009.

== Nearby communities ==
Lake George is located within the city of Oak Grove. Other nearby communities include Anoka, Cedar, East Bethel, and St. Francis.

== See also ==
- List of Minnesota aquatic plants
