= Swedish Evangelical Lutheran Church (Ham Lake, Minnesota) =

Historic church in Minnesota, United States

- U.S. National Register of Historic Places
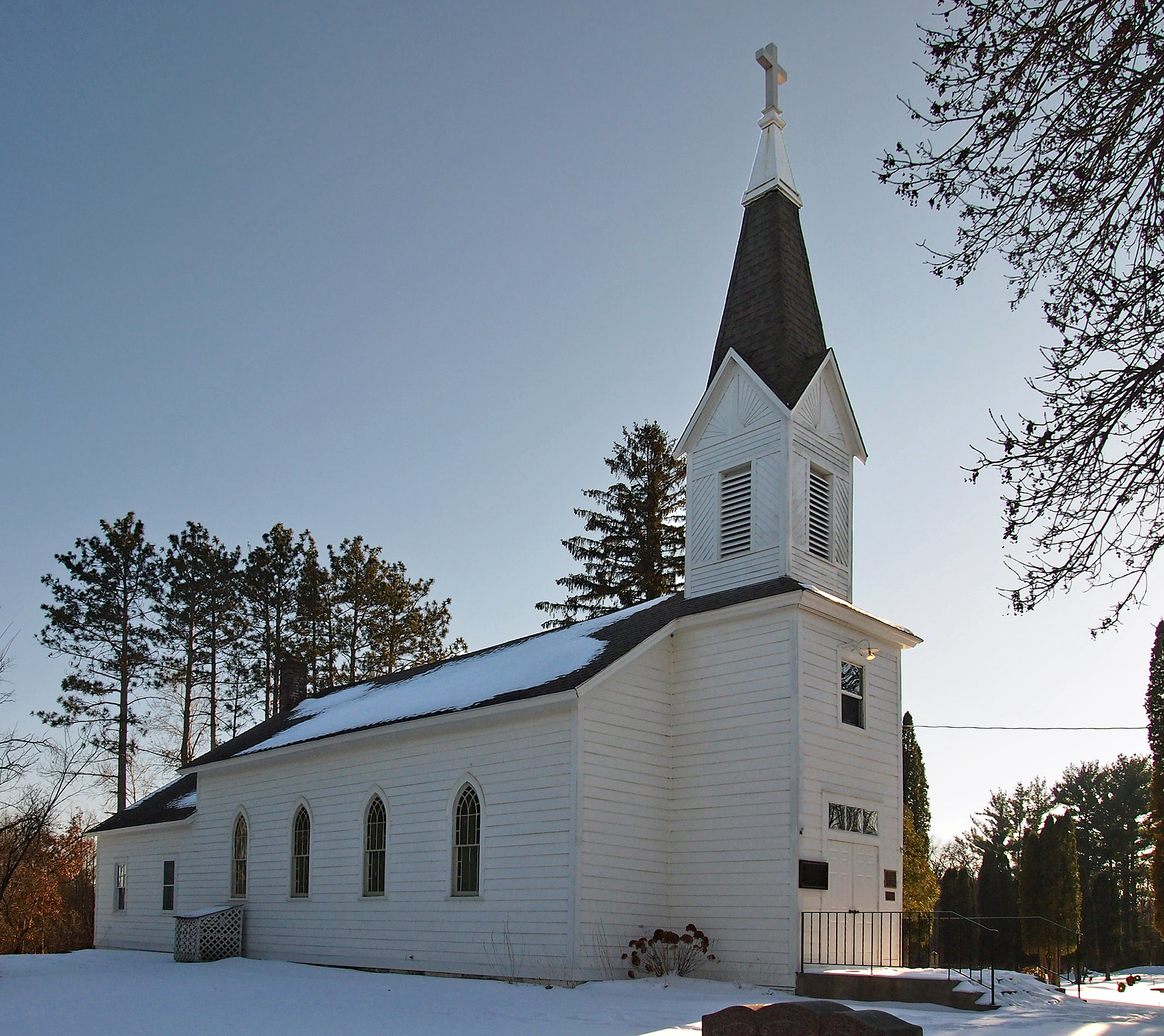
- The Swedish Evangelical Lutheran Church from the northeast
- Location: 2200 Swedish Dr., NE; Ham Lake, Minnesota
- Coordinates: 45°17′36.93″N 93°12′43.03″W
- Built: 1872
- Architect: Per August Gustafson
- Architectural style: Late Victorian
- NRHP reference No.: 79001189
- Added to NRHP: December 26, 1979

The Swedish Evangelical Lutheran Church is a historic property in Anoka County, Minnesota. It is located at 2332 Swedish Drive in Ham Lake, Minnesota. The Late Victorian style church was built in 1872 to the design of architect Per August Gustafson. The church is listed on the National Register of Historic Places. The church is owned and maintained by the congregation of Our Saviour's Lutheran Church of East Bethel, Minnesota and is also known as Our Saviour's Lutheran Church of Ham Lake. Both churches are affiliated with the Evangelical Lutheran Church in America.

== History ==
The following is the text of a plaque hanging on the front of the church. It was placed there as part of an Eagle Scout project in the spring of 2005. It provides an accurate portrayal of the history of the church which was collected from personal accounts and the Anoka County historical records.

"This church, the Swedish Evangelical Lutheran Church of Ham Lake as it is called on the National Register of Historic Places, has a rich history. Founded in 1872, the building was constructed on land donated by Johan and Fredrika Magnuson shortly after their daughters Alida and Emilia died of typhoid fever and a need for a cemetery was realized. Originally laid to rest in their front yard, when the church was completed the two coffins were moved and became the first graves in the cemetery. When the church was first built there were no local pastors, thus, whenever the families in the church wanted to hold a service someone would have to travel to Anoka to pick up the pastor and bring him back. Since that time the church has expanded and required new buildings, but despite its now limited use, the "Old Church" remains an important part of the history of Our Saviour’s Lutheran Church."

In 1964, the church's congregation moved to another facility however the church is used for worship purposes at various times of the year. The congregation now refers to the chapel Our Saviour's Chapel.
