= Cedar, Minnesota =

- Neighborhood
- Location within Minnesota
- Coordinates: 45°19′11″N 93°17′10″W
- Country: United States
- State: Minnesota
- County: Anoka County
- Elevation: 902 ft (275 m)
- Time zone: UTC-6 (Central (CST))
  - Summer (DST): UTC-5 (CDT)
- ZIP code: 55011
- Area code: 763
- GNIS feature ID: 640984

Cedar is a neighborhood of Oak Grove, Anoka County, Minnesota, United States. It was formally absorbed into the city of Oak Grove in 1993. Nearby places include the city of East Bethel. Cedar is located along Cedar Drive, on the south side of Viking Boulevard (Anoka County 22). Cedar Creek flows nearby.

Local businesses had included a cheese factory, still extant, and a station along the former Great Northern Railway. The neighborhood of Cedar is still distinct and identifiable, and signs mark its location, but it has officially been absorbed into the city of Oak Grove.

Cedar originally received its post office in 1899 under the name of Snapp, and changed its name to Cedar in 1900.
