= Crescent Grange Hall No. 512 =

- U.S. National Register of Historic Places
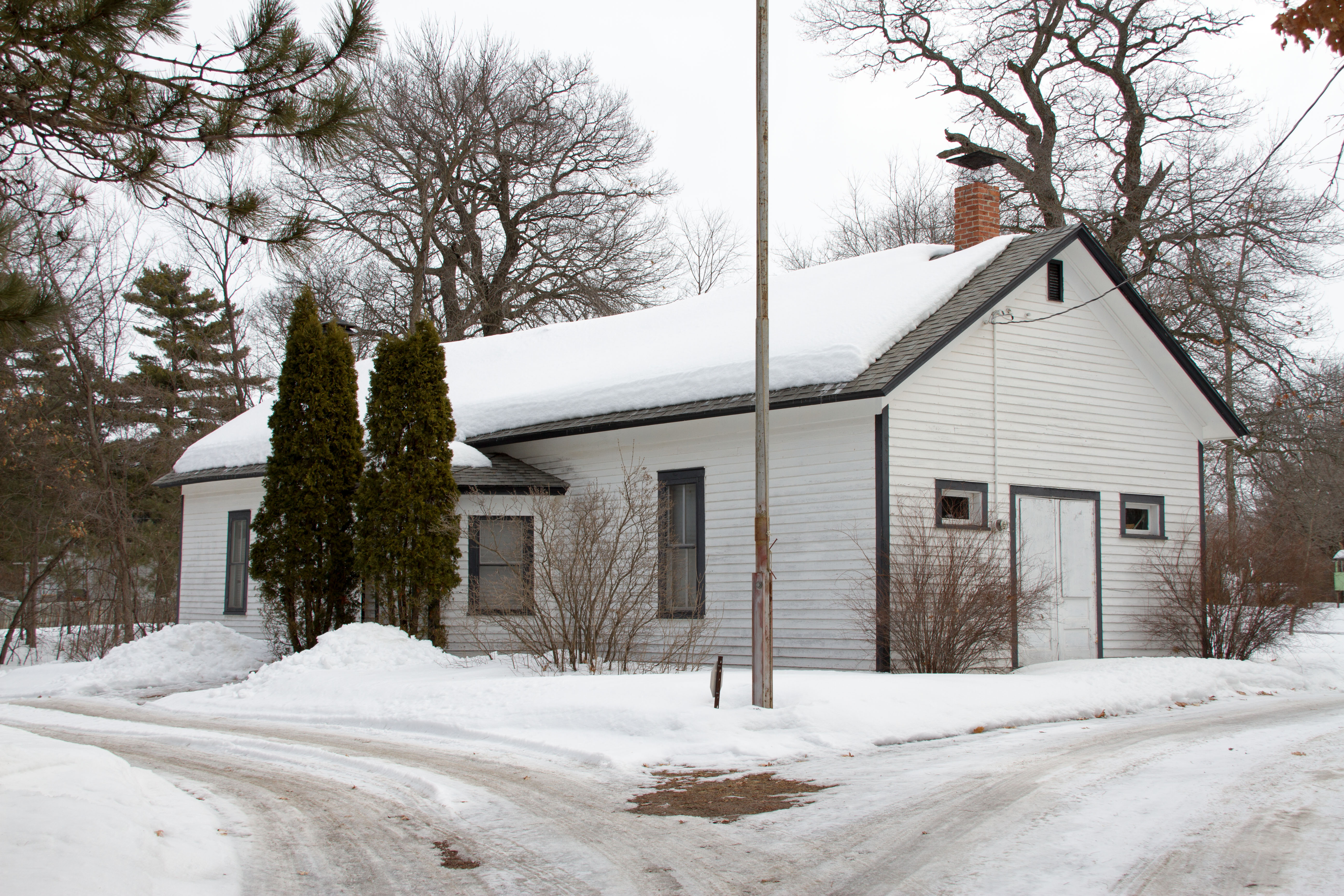
- Crescent Grange Hall #512 from the southwest

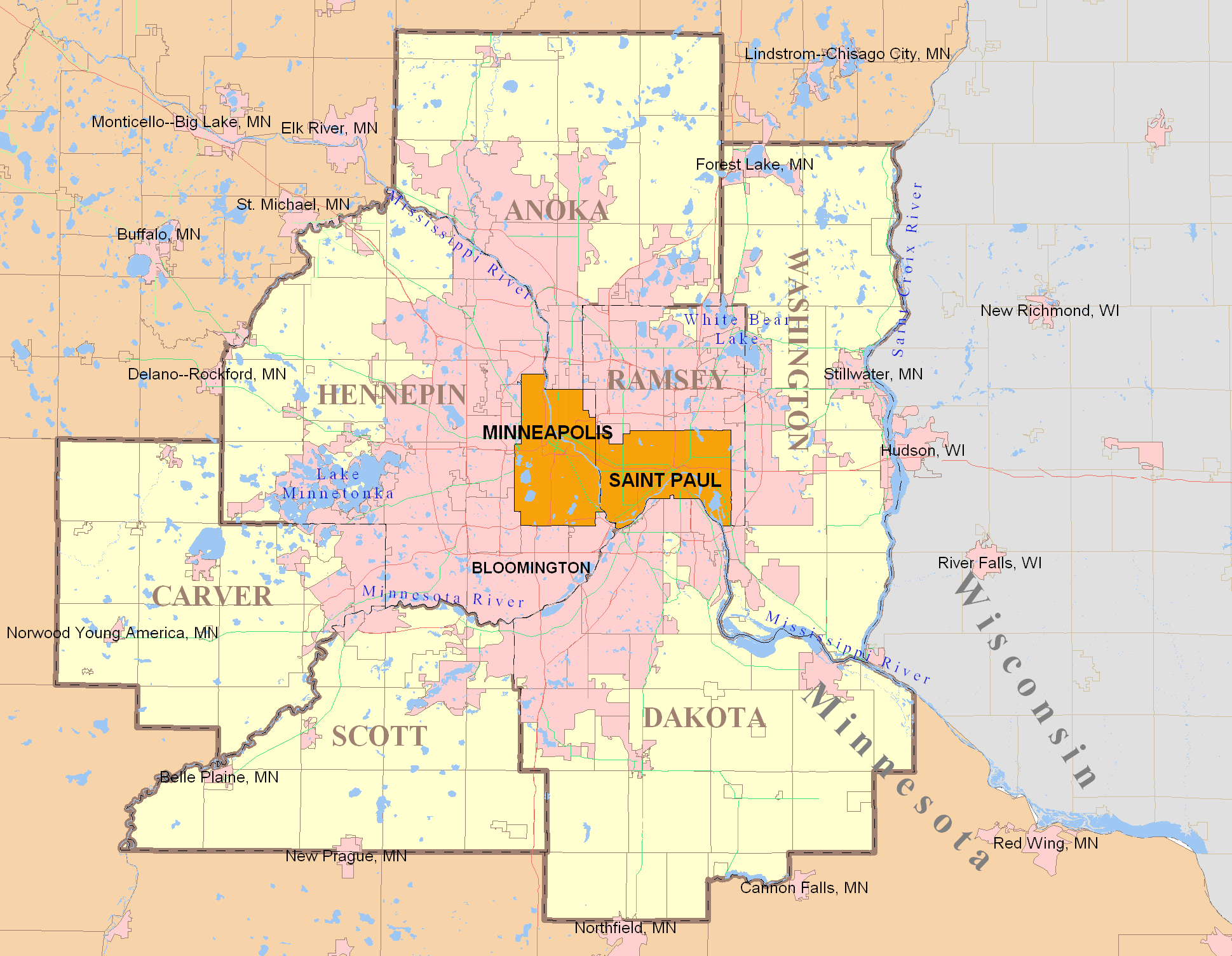
- Location within Minneapolis–Saint Paul Location within Minnesota Location within the United States
- Location: Typo Lake Road, Linwood Township, Minnesota
- Coordinates: 45°23′3.7″N 93°5′59.6″W
- Area: 1 acre (0.40 ha)
- Built: 1881–82
- NRHP reference No.: 79001190
- Added to NRHP: December 26, 1979

Crescent Grange Hall #512 is a former meeting hall of the Grange agricultural society in Linwood Township, Minnesota, United States. It was built from 1881 to 1882 by a chapter of the State Grange of Minnesota, the first state-level subdivision of the National Grange. It was listed on the National Register of Historic Places in 1979 for its local significance in the themes of agriculture and social history. It was nominated for being a well preserved example of an early meeting hall built by a subordinate Grange.

== Origin ==
Crescent Grange Hall #512 is an outgrowth of the Reconstruction era in Minnesota. During this period, rural residents united in response to economic upheaval and high interest rates. Farmers, particularly those in the south and west of the state, struggled to make a living in a volatile and unregulated economy.

After the American Civil War, Southern farmers who had exploited enslaved people for their expertise and labor tried to adapt through sharecropping, while farmers on the Western plains faced falling crop prices. Both became increasingly indebted to bankers and merchants who charged high interest rates. Compounding the problem, railroads and food producers charged high tariffs.

In 1866, the U.S. Department of Agriculture assigned Oliver Hudson Kelley of Minnesota to assess the situation. Kelley, a successful farmer who owned 200 acres (80 ha) of land near Elk River, was struck by the social isolation he encountered on farms. In response, he and six colleagues founded the National Grange and Order of the Patrons of Husbandry, which included both men and women as members. His message to farmers was clear: join the movement, find strength in numbers, and secure prosperity through a share of the market.

Envisioning a way to counteract the tariffs and fraudulent methods endured by the farmers, Kelley encouraged farmers to form cooperatives through which they could store and sell their crops and compete against middlemen and their high fees. He then organized the State Grange of Minnesota—the first such state-level subdivision of the organization—in 1869. By 1875, the national Grange had grown to 858,000 members.

== Construction ==
Minnesota's Crescent Grange #512 was organized in Anoka County's Linwood Township in 1874. Until a hall was built, members met at churches and in the homes of charter members. On February 23, 1881, a meeting was held at the home of J. G. Green in which L.O. Tumbler proposed building a 32-by-20-foot (9.8 by 6.1 m) hall. J. G. Green offered to donate the land for the project, and the motion carried.

On March 25, 1881, Grange #512 members met to cut pine wood from a nearby forest. The men hauled the wood to George Haskell's sawmill near Typo Lake, where they cut it into lumber for building. Construction began in earnest at township 33, range 22, section 4 of Anoka County on the first Saturday in June. Over the summer, members absent from the project were fined one dollar. During this period, the original architectural plans were modified to include sufficient kitchen space.

Crescent Grange Hall #512 held its first formal celebration on July 4, 1882, but work on the structure continued until 1884. The one-story, 46-by-20-foot (14.0 by 6.1 m) structure is capped by a gabled roof with clapboard siding. The interior contains a meeting room, an auditorium, and a kitchen.

In 1916, further embellishments to the hall made by Grange member W.W. Wittig created alcoves on each of side of the building. The front alcove began to serve as an entrance; the one in the rear contained decorative stained glass. Further modifications to save heat and improve acoustics occurred in 1949, when the ceiling was lowered.

== Use and legacy ==
The hall served as a venue for educating and informing farmers of the best practices in agriculture throughout the late 19th and early 20th centuries. It allowed members to share equipment owned collectively (including a threshing machine and saw) and to use a barn space for both storage and social gatherings for the Granger community.

By the turn of the 20th century, the Grange Movement had outlasted the remains of the Farmers' Alliance, a group that called for more explicitly political action and served as a catalyst for the People's Party.

== See also ==
- List of Grange Hall buildings
- National Register of Historic Places listings in Anoka County, Minnesota
