= Martin Lake, Minnesota =

Unincorporated community in Minnesota, US

Martin Lake
- Census-designated place (CDP) and Unincorporated community
- Location Martin Lake (unincorporated) within Linwood Township, Anoka County

- Location within Minnesota Location within the United States
- Coordinates: 45°22′52″N 93°05′42″W
- Country: United States
- State: Minnesota
- County: Anoka County
- Township: Linwood Township

Area
  - Total: 1.75 sq mi (4.53 km^{2})
  - Land: 1.38 sq mi (3.57 km^{2})
  - Water: 0.37 sq mi (0.97 km^{2})
- Elevation: 919 ft (280 m)

Population (2020)
  - Total: 907
  - Density: 658.5/sq mi (254.25/km^{2})
- Time zone: UTC-6 (Central (CST))
  - Summer (DST): UTC-5 (CDT)
- ZIP code: 55079
- Area codes: 651 and 763
- GNIS feature ID: 647575

Martin Lake is an unincorporated community and census-designated place (CDP) in Linwood Township, Anoka County, Minnesota, United States. As of the 2020 census, Martin Lake had a population of 907.

Anoka County Road 26 and Anoka County Road 85 serve as two main routes in the community. Anoka County Road 22 is nearby.

Martin Lake is located within ZIP code 55079, based in Stacy. Nearby places include East Bethel and Stacy.

== Demographics ==
Historical population
Census	Pop.	Note	%±
2010	933		—
2020	907		−2.8%
U.S. Decennial Census

=== 2010 census ===
As of the census of 2010, there were 933 people, 375 households, and 267 families in the CDP. The population density was 677.6 inhabitants per square mile (261.6/km^{2}). There were 434 housing units at an average density of 315.2 per square mile (121.7/km^{2}). The racial makeup of the CDP was 97.1% White, 0.8% African American, 0.3% Native American, 0.4% Asian, 0.3% from other races, and 1.1% from two or more races. Hispanic or Latino of any race were 1.8% of the population.

There were 375 households, of which 27.7% had children under the age of 18 living with them, 56.8% were married couples living together, 7.7% had a female householder with no husband present, 6.7% had a male householder with no wife present, and 28.8% were non-families. 22.9% of all households were made up of individuals, and 2.9% had someone living alone who was 65 years of age or older. The average household size was 2.49 and the average family size was 2.91.

The median age in the CDP was 44.5 years. 20.8% of residents were under the age of 18; 7.1% were between the ages of 18 and 24; 23.6% were from 25 to 44; 42.0% were from 45 to 64; and 6.5% were 65 years of age or older. The gender makeup of the CDP was 54.3% male and 45.7% female.
