= Coopers Corner =

Coopers Corner can refer to:

- Coopers Corner, Minnesota
- Coopers Corner, New Jersey
