= Linwood, Minnesota =

Unincorporated community in Minnesota, United States

Linwood
- Unincorporated community
- Location within Minnesota Location within the United States
- Coordinates: 45°21′25″N 93°06′42″W
- Country: United States
- State: Minnesota
- County: Anoka County
- Township: Linwood Township
- Elevation: 909 ft (277 m)
- Time zone: UTC-6 (Central (CST))
  - Summer (DST): UTC-5 (CDT)
- Area codes: 651 and 763
- GNIS feature ID: 646728

Linwood is an unincorporated community in Linwood Township, Anoka County, Minnesota, United States.

Linwood is located on the north shore of Linwood Lake, 5 miles (8.0 km) east-northeast of East Bethel.

Anoka County Road 22 serves as a main route in the community.
