= Minnesota State Highway 242 =

State highway in Minnesota, United States

Trunk Highway 242
- MN 242 highlighted in red

Route information
- Maintained by MnDOT
- Length: 5.3 mi (8.5 km)
- Existed: July 1, 1949–June 15, 2007

Major junctions
- West end: US 10 / MN 47 / CSAH 14 in Coon Rapids
- East end: MN 65 / CSAH 14 in Blaine

Location
- Country: United States
- State: Minnesota
- Counties: Anoka

Highway system
- Minnesota Trunk Highway System; Interstate; US; State; Legislative; Scenic
← MN 241	→ MN 243

Minnesota State Highway 242 was a 5.3-mile-long (8.5 km) highway in Minnesota. It connected U.S. Highway 10 and Minnesota State Highway 47 near Coon Rapids with Minnesota State Highway 65 in Blaine. It has been classified by the Metropolitan Council as a primary arterial street.

== Route description ==
Highway 242 originally served as an east–west route between the cities of Anoka, Coon Rapids, and Blaine.

The route was legally defined as Route 242 in the Minnesota Statutes.

== History ==
Highway 242 was authorized on July 1, 1949 and was paved when it was marked.

The highway used to run to downtown Anoka, but in 1979 it was truncated at its easternmost intersection with U.S. Highway 10.

On June 15, 2007, Highway 242 was transferred from the State of Minnesota to Anoka County maintenance. It is now an extension of County State Aid Highway (CSAH) 14.

== Major intersections ==
The entire route was in Anoka County.

Location	mi	km	Destinations	Notes
Anoka			US 10 / US 169	
Anoka			US 169	
Anoka			Rum River	
Anoka			CSAH 31 (4th Avenue)	
Anoka			CSAH 1 (5th Avenue)	
Anoka			CSAH 7 (7th Avenue)	
Coon Rapids			CSAH 9 (Round Lake Boulevard)	
Coon Rapids			US 10 / MN 47	
Coon Rapids			CSAH 18 (Coon Creek Boulevard)	
Coon Rapids			CSAH 78 (Hanson Boulevard)	
Blaine			CSAH 51 (University Avenue)	
Blaine			MN 65	
1.000 mi = 1.609 km; 1.000 km = 0.621 mi
