= Linwood Township, Anoka County, Minnesota =

Township in Minnesota, United States

Linwood Township
- Township
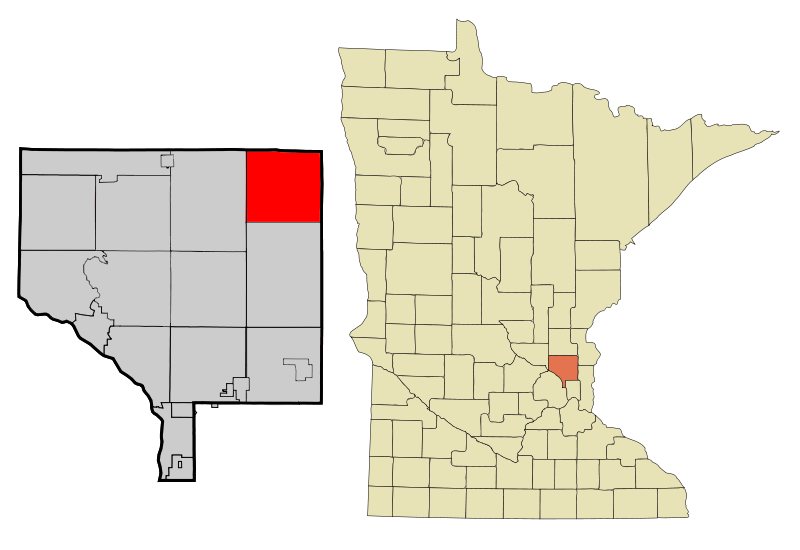
- Location of Linwood Township (unincorporated) within Anoka County, Minnesota
- Coordinates: 45°22′50″N 93°5′7″W
- Country: United States
- State: Minnesota
- County: Anoka

Area
  - Total: 35.9 sq mi (93.0 km^{2})
  - Land: 33.2 sq mi (86.1 km^{2})
  - Water: 2.7 sq mi (6.9 km^{2})
- Elevation: 892 ft (272 m)

Population (2020)
  - Total: 5,334
  - Density: 160/sq mi (62/km^{2})
- Time zone: UTC-6 (Central (CST))
  - Summer (DST): UTC-5 (CDT)
- ZIP code: 55005
- Area codes: 651 and 763
- FIPS code: 27-37376
- GNIS feature ID: 0664793
- Website: linwoodtownshipmn.gov

Linwood Township is a township in Anoka County, Minnesota, United States. The population was 5,123 at the 2010 census. The township contains the census-designated place of Martin Lake and the unincorporated village of Linwood. Linwood Township is the only area of Anoka County that is not an incorporated city.

== History ==
Linwood Township was organized in 1871 from Bethel Township. It took its name from Linwood Lake.

== Geography ==
According to the United States Census Bureau, the township has a total area of 35.9 square miles (93.0 km^{2}), of which 33.2 square miles (86.1 km^{2}) is land and 2.7 square miles (6.9 km^{2}), or 7.42%, is water. County Road 22 serves as one of the main routes in the community.

== Demographics ==
Historical population
Census	Pop.	Note	%±
1880	227		—
1890	242		6.6%
1900	333		37.6%
1910	303		−9.0%
1920	338		11.6%
1930	297		−12.1%
1940	317		6.7%
1950	330		4.1%
1960	509		54.2%
1970	1,004		97.2%
1980	2,839		182.8%
1990	3,588		26.4%
2000	4,668		30.1%
2010	5,123		9.7%
2020	5,334		4.1%
U.S. Decennial Census

As of the census of 2000, there were 4,668 people, 1,578 households, and 1,292 families residing in the township. The population density was 139.9 inhabitants per square mile (54.0/km^{2}). There were 1,662 housing units at an average density of 49.8 per square mile (19.2/km^{2}). The racial makeup of the township was 97.45% White, 0.30% African American, 0.39% Native American, 0.30% Asian, 0.11% Pacific Islander, 0.13% from other races, and 1.33% from two or more races. Hispanic or Latino of any race were 1.20% of the population.

There were 1,578 households, out of which 44.5% had children under the age of 18 living with them, 70.8% were married couples living together, 6.5% had a female householder with no husband present, and 18.1% were non-families. 13.3% of all households were made up of individuals, and 2.2% had someone living alone who was 65 years of age or older. The average household size was 2.95 and the average family size was 3.22.

In the township the population was spread out, with 30.0% under the age of 18, 6.8% from 18 to 24, 35.3% from 25 to 44, 23.4% from 45 to 64, and 4.5% who were 65 years of age or older. The median age was 35 years. For every 100 females, there were 109.7 males. For every 100 females age 18 and over, there were 108.1 males.

The median income for a household in the township was $58,596, and the median income for a family was $60,000. Males had a median income of $43,373 versus $30,568 for females. The per capita income for the township was $23,690. About 2.5% of families and 3.5% of the population were below the poverty line, including 4.5% of those under age 18 and none of those age 65 or over. The original homesteading families were the Broadbents, Carlisles, Clarks, and Browns.

== Historic site ==
- Crescent Grange Hall No. 512 in Linwood Township is listed in the National Register of Historic Places.
