= Linwood Lake (Anoka County, Minnesota) =

Lake in the state of Minnesota, United States

- Location within Minnesota
- Location: Anoka County, Minnesota
- Coordinates: 45°21′N 93°6.5′W
- Type: lake

Linwood Lake is a lake in Anoka County, Minnesota, in the United States. The name is thought to be derived from linwood trees.
