= Coopers Corner, Minnesota =

Locality in East Bethel, Minnesota, US

Coordinates: 45°23′57″N 93°14′05″W

Coopers Corner is a locality within the city of East Bethel in Anoka County, Minnesota, United States.

== Location ==
Coopers Corner is located at the intersection of Minnesota State Highway 65 and 237th Avenue within the city of East Bethel.

== History ==
The site of Coopers Corner is the original townsite of Bethel. Bethel was settled in 1856 by Quaker immigrants from the east and received its post office in 1865, but when the Great Northern Railway bypassed the town in 1898 almost the entire town was moved about two miles to the west, relocating to be on the new rail line. Storekeeper James Cooper remained in business at the old location, the site coming known thereafter as Cooper's Corner. Coopers Corner has officially been absorbed into the city of East Bethel.

== Transportation ==
- Minnesota State Highway 65
