= Nowthen, Minnesota =

City in Minnesota, United States

Nowthen
- City
- Motto: "Where It Still Feels Like Country."
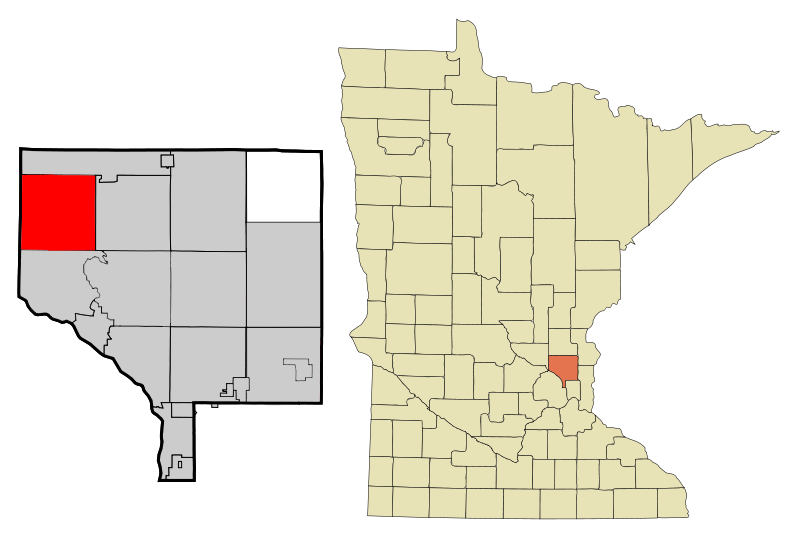
- Location of the city of Nowthen within Anoka County, Minnesota
- Coordinates: 45°19′57″N 93°26′48″W
- Country: United States
- State: Minnesota
- County: Anoka
- Incorporated: 2008

Government
  - Mayor: Shane Hybben (2025-Present)

Area
  - Total: 35.19 sq mi (91.15 km^{2})
  - Land: 33.66 sq mi (87.17 km^{2})
  - Water: 1.54 sq mi (3.98 km^{2})
- Elevation: 925 ft (282 m)

Population (2020)
  - Total: 4,536
  - Density: 134.8/sq mi (52.04/km^{2})
- Time zone: UTC-6 (Central (CST))
  - Summer (DST): UTC-5 (CDT)
- Postal code: 55303
- Area code: 763
- FIPS code: 27-47536
- GNIS feature ID: 2437910
- Website: Official website

Nowthen is a city in Anoka County, Minnesota, United States. The population was 4,536 at the 2020 census.

== Geography ==
According to the United States Census Bureau, the city has a total area of 35.10 square miles (90.91 km^{2}), of which 33.56 square miles (86.92 km^{2}) is land and 1.54 square miles (3.99 km^{2}) is water. Nowthen is located in the northwestern section of Anoka County.

Minnesota State Highway 47 and County Road 22 are two of the main routes in the community.

Nearby places include St. Francis, Oak Grove, Andover, Ramsey, and Elk River. Nowthen is located 12 miles north-northwest of the city of Anoka.

== History ==
In 1869, Burns Township broke off from St. Francis Township.

The city was formerly known as Burns Township until June 30, 2008, when it was incorporated as the city of Nowthen. The drive toward incorporation started at the township's annual meeting in March 2007, when residents decided to incorporate in order to prevent annexation by other nearby cities. The name originated from an unincorporated community named Nowthen near the intersection of County Roads 5 and 22 within the former township. "Nowthen" was coined by the town's first postmaster, James Hare, who had the habit of saying "Now, then" in conversation.

== Demographics ==
Historical population
Census	Pop.	Note	%±
1870	340		—
1880	522		53.5%
1890	650		24.5%
1900	920		41.5%
1910	926		0.7%
1920	974		5.2%
1930	899		−7.7%
1940	868		−3.4%
1950	806		−7.1%
1960	966		19.9%
1970	1,129		16.9%
1980	1,976		75.0%
1990	2,429		22.9%
2000	3,557		46.4%
2010	4,443		24.9%
2020	4,536		2.1%
U.S. Decennial Census

=== 2020 census ===
As of the 2020 census, Nowthen had a population of 4,536. The median age was 42.2 years. 24.4% of residents were under the age of 18 and 13.1% of residents were 65 years of age or older. For every 100 females there were 107.7 males, and for every 100 females age 18 and over there were 106.8 males age 18 and over.

0.0% of residents lived in urban areas, while 100.0% lived in rural areas.

There were 1,510 households in Nowthen, of which 35.5% had children under the age of 18 living in them. Of all households, 72.3% were married-couple households, 11.8% were households with a male householder and no spouse or partner present, and 10.1% were households with a female householder and no spouse or partner present. About 11.7% of all households were made up of individuals and 4.8% had someone living alone who was 65 years of age or older.

There were 1,556 housing units, of which 3.0% were vacant. The homeowner vacancy rate was 0.4% and the rental vacancy rate was 7.1%.

Racial composition as of the 2020 census
Race	Number	Percent
White	4,190	92.4%
Black or African American	32	0.7%
American Indian and Alaska Native	16	0.4%
Asian	72	1.6%
Native Hawaiian and Other Pacific Islander	6	0.1%
Some other race	13	0.3%
Two or more races	207	4.6%
Hispanic or Latino (of any race)	92	2.0%

=== 2010 census ===
As of the census of 2010, there were 4,443 people, 1,450 households, and 1,227 families residing in the city. The population density was 132.4 inhabitants per square mile (51.1/km^{2}). There were 1,494 housing units at an average density of 44.5 per square mile (17.2/km^{2}). The racial makeup of the city was 96.2% White, 0.9% African American, 0.5% Native American, 1.3% Asian, 0.1% from other races, and 0.9% from two or more races. Hispanic or Latino of any race were 1.0% of the population.

There were 1,450 households, of which 42.3% had children under the age of 18 living with them, 74.6% were married couples living together, 5.3% had a female householder with no husband present, 4.7% had a male householder with no wife present, and 15.4% were non-families. 11.4% of all households were made up of individuals, and 3% had someone living alone who was 65 years of age or older. The average household size was 3.04 and the average family size was 3.27.

The median age in the city was 39.9 years. 28.3% of residents were under the age of 18; 8.5% were between the ages of 18 and 24; 23.2% were from 25 to 44; 33% were from 45 to 64; and 7% were 65 years of age or older. The gender makeup of the city was 52.1% male and 47.9% female.

=== 2000 census ===
As of the census of 2000, there were 3,557 people, 1,123 households, and 985 families residing in the township. The population density was 105.3 inhabitants per square mile (40.7/km^{2}). There were 1,136 housing units at an average density of 33.6 per square mile (13.0/km^{2}). The racial makeup of the township was 98.54% White, 0.20% African American, 0.28% Native American, 0.17% Asian, 0.14% from other races, and 0.67% from two or more races. Hispanic or Latino of any race were 0.59% of the population.

There were 1,123 households, out of which 47.4% had children under the age of 18 living with them, 80.3% were married couples living together, 3.9% had a female householder with no husband present, and 12.2% were non-families. 8.4% of all households were made up of individuals, and 2.0% had someone living alone who was 65 years of age or older. The average household size was 3.16 and the average family size was 3.36.

In the township the population was spread out, with 32.7% under the age of 18, 5.8% from 18 to 24, 34.5% from 25 to 44, 21.9% from 45 to 64, and 5.0% who were 65 years of age or older. The median age was 34 years. For every 100 females, there were 109.9 males. For every 100 females age 18 and over, there were 106.8 males.

The median income for a household in the township was $63,819, and the median income for a family was $65,843. Males had a median income of $42,374 versus $31,454 for females. The per capita income for the township was $21,569. About 4.1% of families and 4.6% of the population were below the poverty line, including 6.0% of those under age 18 and none of those age 65 or over.

== Law enforcement ==
Historically the community did not have its own law enforcement agency and instead relied on the Anoka County Sheriff's Office. In 2011, the Sheriff’s Office asked the city to pay for non-emergency law enforcement services. The city council voted 3–2 to not do this, which led to the city only having emergency law enforcement as it chose not to establish its own police force. The department's request would have meant a 27% increase in property taxes.

=== First responders ===
Nowthen built their first fire department in 2021. Ramsey wanted to charge Nowthen about $160,000 in administrative costs, the mayor thought that was too high. Nowthen will take a fire engine, tanker, rescue rig, hoses and other equipment from Ramsey and they also gain a fire station that they can now use. They will pay the city of St. Francis about $75,000 a year for the next three years to have the assistance chief, Dave Schmidt, oversee the startup and head the department.

They currently have 12 members working for the Fire Department, and are expecting eight more to join.

== Culture ==
=== Parks ===
The city of Nowthen has two parks, Nowthen Memorial Park and Twin Lakes City Park.

=== Nowthen Threshing Show ===
The Nowthen Threshing Show is annual event held in the area for over 50 years. It is a three-day event that takes place during the third full weekend in August. With the tagline of “Bringing the Past to the Present," The show focuses on demonstrations of historical rural life.
