= Ham Lake, Minnesota =

City in Minnesota, United States

Ham Lake
- City
- Motto: "Convenient Country Living"
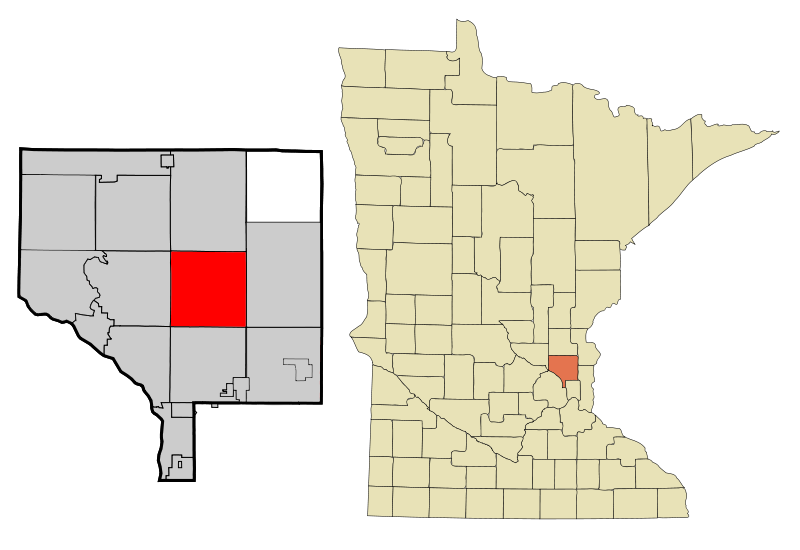
- Location of the city of Ham Lake within Anoka County, Minnesota
- Coordinates: 45°15′16″N 93°12′57″W
- Country: United States
- State: Minnesota
- County: Anoka

Area
  - Total: 35.86 sq mi (92.88 km^{2})
  - Land: 34.41 sq mi (89.13 km^{2})
  - Water: 1.45 sq mi (3.75 km^{2})
- Elevation: 896 ft (273 m)

Population (2020)
  - Total: 16,464
  - Density: 478.4/sq mi (184.71/km^{2})
- Time zone: UTC-6 (Central (CST))
  - Summer (DST): UTC-5 (CDT)
- ZIP code: 55304
- Area code: 763
- FIPS code: 27-26738
- GNIS feature ID: 2394273
- Website: City of Ham Lake

Ham Lake is a city in Anoka County, Minnesota, United States. It is a suburb in the Minneapolis–Saint Paul metropolitan area. The population was 16,464 at the 2020 census. It is in the Anoka-Hennepin School District, one of Minnesota's largest school districts.

== Geography ==
According to the United States Census Bureau, the city has an area of 35.71 square miles (92.49 km^{2}), of which 34.39 square miles (89.07 km^{2}) is land and 1.32 square miles (3.42 km^{2}) is water.

Ham Lake is in central Anoka County.

=== Adjacent cities ===
- Bethel (north)
- East Bethel (north)
- Columbus (east)
- Lino Lakes (southeast)
- Blaine (south)
- Coon Rapids (southwest)
- Andover (west)
- Oak Grove (northwest)

The community of Soderville is in northern Ham Lake.

== Transportation ==
Minnesota State Highway 65 serves as a main route in the city.

== History ==
The earliest record of settlers in the Ham Lake area goes back to 1855, and in 1856, settlers established a town just south and west of a lake shaped like a ham. The settlers platted and sold lots for a community they named Glen Carey, a Scottish name meaning "beautiful valley". The location was widely advertised as a future city. In 1857, all the houses were destroyed by a prairie fire. Some of the inhabitants barely escaped with their lives, saving only a few household goods. The settlers soon left the area as they had nowhere to live.

There was no more settlement until 1866, when a Norwegian man settled in the area. He was soon followed by other Scandinavians. The Scandinavian settlers found it difficult to pronounce "Glen Carey". Since no official name had been chosen by the people, the commissioners named it Ham Lake.

Early settlers found the soil well-suited to farming as it was not as rocky as Scandinavia's. Dairying became an important industry. The pioneer farmers soon found the soil suited to growing potatoes and this became an important commodity for both cash sales and trading. Ham Lake Township split from Grow Township (Andover) in 1871. In 1872, immigrants built the Swedish Evangelical Lutheran Church.

From the early 1900s through the 1930s, potato farming was at its peak in what was then Ham Lake Township. Some of the farms remaining today are the sod farms in southeastern Ham Lake, where the ground is low and the soil black and heavy, making it well suited to this crop, as well as corn and potatoes in some places.

In 1894, when the population was over 400, a group of farmers formed a cooperative and built a creamery. Several general stores were built there shortly afterward. What became the main store in town, Soderquist's, was built on land sold to the Soderquist family by the Olson family, who had extensive landholdings along what later became Highway 65. As in many small American communities, over time all the "old" families became related through marriage. Although many of the establishing families have since moved out of Ham Lake due to increasing property taxes and crowding, these familial connections remain, and many members of the families are still in close contact.

In 1922, a service garage opened in northern Ham Lake.

A Fire Department was established in 1969, with Eldon Hentges as the first fire chief.

Ham Lake officially became a city on January 8, 1974, with Hentges serving as the first mayor.

== Demographics ==
Historical population
| Census | Pop. | Note | %± |
|---|---|---|---|
| 1880 | 235 | | — |
| 1890 | 384 | | 63.4% |
| 1900 | 505 | | 31.5% |
| 1910 | 552 | | 9.3% |
| 1920 | 524 | | −5.1% |
| 1930 | 544 | | 3.8% |
| 1940 | 694 | | 27.6% |
| 1950 | 793 | | 14.3% |
| 1960 | 1,423 | | 79.4% |
| 1970 | 3,327 | | 133.8% |
| 1980 | 7,832 | | 135.4% |
| 1990 | 8,924 | | 13.9% |
| 2000 | 12,710 | | 42.4% |
| 2010 | 15,296 | | 20.3% |
| 2020 | 16,464 | | 7.6% |
U.S. Decennial Census

=== 2020 census ===
As of the 2020 census, Ham Lake had a population of 16,464. The median age was 41.7 years. 24.3% of residents were under the age of 18 and 15.2% of residents were 65 years of age or older. For every 100 females there were 103.9 males, and for every 100 females age 18 and over there were 103.4 males age 18 and over.

51.8% of residents lived in urban areas, while 48.2% lived in rural areas.

There were 5,718 households in Ham Lake, of which 34.7% had children under the age of 18 living in them. Of all households, 68.9% were married-couple households, 12.4% were households with a male householder and no spouse or partner present, and 12.7% were households with a female householder and no spouse or partner present. About 15.1% of all households were made up of individuals and 7.1% had someone living alone who was 65 years of age or older.

There were 5,850 housing units, of which 2.3% were vacant. The homeowner vacancy rate was 0.6% and the rental vacancy rate was 3.9%.

Racial composition as of the 2020 census
| Race | Number | Percent |
|---|---|---|
| White | 14,535 | 88.3% |
| Black or African American | 116 | 0.7% |
| American Indian and Alaska Native | 53 | 0.3% |
| Asian | 666 | 4.0% |
| Native Hawaiian and Other Pacific Islander | 1 | 0.0% |
| Some other race | 196 | 1.2% |
| Two or more races | 897 | 5.4% |
| Hispanic or Latino (of any race) | 443 | 2.7% |

=== 2010 census ===
At the 2010 census, there were 15,296 people, 5,171 households and 4,228 families living in the city. The population density was 444.8 inhabitants per square mile (171.7/km^{2}). There were 5,378 housing units at an average density of 156.4 per square mile (60.4/km^{2}). The racial makeup of the city was 94.4% White, 0.7% African American, 0.4% Native American, 2.5% Asian, 0.8% from other races, and 1.3% from two or more races. Hispanic or Latino of any race were 2.2% of the population.

There were 5,171 households, of which 40.5% had children under the age of 18 living with them, 71.3% were married couples living together, 6.2% had a female householder with no husband present, 4.2% had a male householder with no wife present, and 18.2% were non-families. 13.5% of all households were made up of individuals, and 4.4% had someone living alone who was 65 years of age or older. The average household size was 2.95 and the average family size was 3.25.

The median age was 40.1 years. 27.5% of residents were under the age of 18; 7.6% were between the ages of 18 and 24; 23.4% were from 25 to 44; 33.1% were from 45 to 64; and 8.4% were 65 years of age or older. The gender makeup of the city was 51.1% male and 48.9% female.

=== 2000 census ===
At the 2000 census, there were 12,710 people, 4,139 households and 3,472 families living in the city. The population density was 368.9 inhabitants per square mile (142.4/km^{2}). There were 4,208 housing units at an average density of 122.1 per square mile (47.1/km^{2}). The racial makeup of the city was 96.70% White, 0.50% African American, 0.39% Native American, 0.76% Asian, 0.04% Pacific Islander, 0.37% from other races, and 1.25% from two or more races. Hispanic or Latino of any race were 1.14% of the population.

There were 4,139 households, of which 45.9% had children under the age of 18 living with them, 74.0% were married couples living together, 6.0% had a female householder with no husband present, and 16.1% were non-families. 11.4% of all households were made up of individuals, and 2.5% had someone living alone who was 65 years of age or older. The average household size was 3.07 and the average family size was 3.33.

31.0% of the population were under the age of 18, 7.5% from 18 to 24, 33.8% from 25 to 44, 23.4% from 45 to 64, and 4.2% who were 65 years of age or older. The median age was 34 years. For every 100 females, there were 109.3 males. For every 100 females age 18 and over, there were 106.2 males.

The median household income was $67,750 and the median family income was $71,905. Males had a median income of $44,462 and females $31,239. The per capita income was $24,329. About 1.2% of families and 2.1% of the population were below the poverty line, including 1.3% of those under age 18 and 3.0% of those age 65 or over.

== Notable people ==
- Trevor Frischmon – professional ice hockey center who played in the NHL for the Columbus Blue Jackets and New York Islanders.
- Andy Erikson – stand-up comedian.
