= Oak Grove, Minnesota =

City in Minnesota, United States

Oak Grove
- City
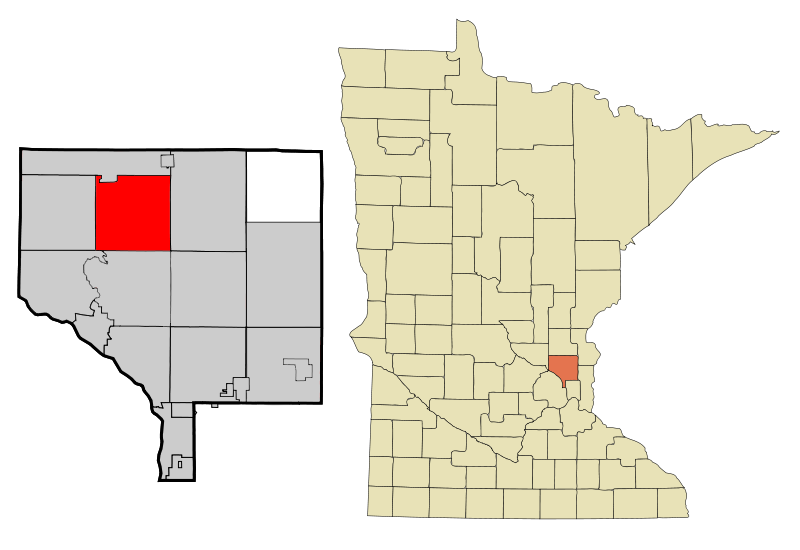
- Location of the city of Oak Grove within Anoka County, Minnesota
- Coordinates: 45°20′27″N 93°20′0″W
- Country: United States
- State: Minnesota
- County: Anoka
- Settled: 1855
- Organized: 1857
- Incorporated: 1993

Government
  - Mayor: Weston Rolf

Area
  - Total: 35.20 sq mi (91.18 km^{2})
  - Land: 33.91 sq mi (87.82 km^{2})
  - Water: 1.30 sq mi (3.36 km^{2})
- Elevation: 896 ft (273 m)

Population (2020)
  - Total: 8,929
  - Estimate (2022): 9,130
  - Density: 263.3/sq mi (101.67/km^{2})
- Time zone: UTC−6 (Central (CST))
  - Summer (DST): UTC−5 (CDT)
- ZIP Codes: 55005, 55011, 55303
- Area code: 763
- FIPS code: 27-47690
- GNIS feature ID: 2395282
- Sales tax: 8.525%
- Website: oakgrovemn.gov

Oak Grove is a city in Anoka County, Minnesota, United States. It is north of Minneapolis. The population was 8,929 at the 2020 census.

== Geography ==
According to the United States Census Bureau, the city has an area of 35.16 square miles (91.06 km^{2}), of which 33.85 square miles (87.67 km^{2}) is land and 1.31 square miles (3.39 km^{2}) is water. County Roads 7, 9, 13, 22, and 78 are the main routes in the community. State Highway 47 (MN 47) passes briefly through the northwest corner of Oak Grove.

Lake George is within the city of Oak Grove.

=== Adjacent cities ===
- St. Francis (north)
- East Bethel (east)
- Ham Lake (southeast)
- Andover (south)
- Ramsey (southwest)
- Nowthen (west)

== History ==
Oak Grove first became an organized township in 1857, and was so named because of the large groves of oak trees in the area. The village of Oak Grove was founded in 1854, and a post office operated from 1857 to 1901. The township incorporated as the city of Oak Grove in 1993.

== Demographics ==
Historical population
Census	Pop.	Note	%±
1860	231		—
1870	198		−14.3%
1880	305		54.0%
1890	293		−3.9%
1900	494		68.6%
1910	607		22.9%
1920	615		1.3%
1930	453		−26.3%
1940	557		23.0%
1950	624		12.0%
1960	826		32.4%
1970	1,674		102.7%
1980	3,926		134.5%
1990	5,441		38.6%
2000	6,903		26.9%
2010	8,031		16.3%
2020	8,929		11.2%
2022 (est.)	9,130		2.3%
U.S. Decennial Census; 2020 Census

=== 2020 census ===
As of the 2020 census, Oak Grove had a population of 8,929. The median age was 43.0 years. 23.1% of residents were under the age of 18 and 15.1% of residents were 65 years of age or older. For every 100 females there were 107.4 males, and for every 100 females age 18 and over there were 107.0 males age 18 and over.

13.5% of residents lived in urban areas, while 86.5% lived in rural areas.

There were 3,078 households in Oak Grove, of which 32.3% had children under the age of 18 living in them. Of all households, 72.5% were married-couple households, 12.0% were households with a male householder and no spouse or partner present, and 9.3% were households with a female householder and no spouse or partner present. About 12.1% of all households were made up of individuals and 5.4% had someone living alone who was 65 years of age or older.

There were 3,164 housing units, of which 2.7% were vacant. The homeowner vacancy rate was 0.7% and the rental vacancy rate was 5.0%.

Racial composition as of the 2020 census
Race	Number	Percent
White	7,988	89.5%
Black or African American	53	0.6%
American Indian and Alaska Native	39	0.4%
Asian	312	3.5%
Native Hawaiian and Other Pacific Islander	0	0.0%
Some other race	56	0.6%
Two or more races	481	5.4%
Hispanic or Latino (of any race)	170	1.9%

=== 2010 census ===
As of the census of 2010, there were 8,031 people, 2,744 households, and 2,237 families residing in the city. The population density was 237.3 inhabitants per square mile (91.6/km^{2}). There were 2,882 housing units at an average density of 85.1 per square mile (32.9/km^{2}). The racial makeup of the city was 95.8% White, 0.5% African American, 0.3% Native American, 1.9% Asian, 0.3% from other races, and 1.3% from two or more races. Hispanic or Latino of any race were 1.2% of the population.

There were 2,744 households, of which 39.8% had children under the age of 18 living with them, 72.6% were married couples living together, 4.7% had a female householder with no husband present, 4.3% had a male householder with no wife present, and 18.5% were non-families. 13.1% of all households were made up of individuals, and 3.6% had someone living alone who was 65 years of age or older. The average household size was 2.92 and the average family size was 3.21.

The median age in the city was 40 years. 26.5% of residents were under the age of 18; 7.5% were between the ages of 18 and 24; 24.6% were from 25 to 44; 33.3% were from 45 to 64; and 8.2% were 65 years of age or older. The gender makeup of the city was 52.3% male and 47.7% female.

=== 2000 census ===
As of the census of 2000, there were 6,903 people, 2,200 households, and 1,883 families residing in the city. The population density was 204.9 inhabitants per square mile (79.1/km^{2}). There were 2,232 housing units at an average density of 66.2 per square mile (25.6/km^{2}). The racial makeup of the city was 97.20% White, 0.51% African American, 0.68% Native American, 0.48% Asian, 0.22% from other races, and 0.91% from two or more races. Hispanic or Latino of any race were 0.59% of the population.

There were 2,200 households, out of which 45.6% had children under the age of 18 living with them, 76.3% were married couples living together, 5.0% had a female householder with no husband present, and 14.4% were non-families. 10.6% of all households were made up of individuals, and 1.6% had someone living alone who was 65 years of age or older. The average household size was 3.11 and the average family size was 3.33.

In the city, the population was spread out, with 32.0% under the age of 18, 6.8% from 18 to 24, 33.8% from 25 to 44, 23.9% from 45 to 64, and 3.5% who were 65 years of age or older. The median age was 34 years. For every 100 females, there were 114.4 males. For every 100 females age 18 and over, there were 112.8 males.

The median income for a household in the city was $70,169, and the median income for a family was $73,728. Males had a median income of $44,855 versus $29,009 for females. The per capita income for the city was $23,693. About 1.0% of families and 1.5% of the population were below the poverty line, including 0.9% of those under age 18 and 3.6% of those age 65 or over.

== Notable person ==
- Sean Sherk – retired mixed martial artist and former UFC Lightweight Champion, is from Oak Grove

== In popular culture ==
- Golan the Insatiable, an animated television series that first aired in Fox's Animation Domination High-Def programming block in November 2013, is about "a menacing godlord from another dimension" who becomes trapped in a small Minnesota town, and is set in Oak Grove.
