= Minnesota State Highway 47 =

State highway in Minnesota, United States

Trunk Highway 47
- MN 47 highlighted in red

Route information
- Maintained by MnDOT
- Length: 126.872 mi (204.181 km)
- Existed: 1963–present
- Tourist routes: Lake Mille Lacs Scenic Byway

Major junctions
- South end: MN 65 in Minneapolis
- I-694 at Fridley; US 10 / MN 610 at Coon Rapids; US 10 / US 169 at Anoka; MN 95 at Pine Brook; MN 23 at Ogilvie; MN 27 at Isle; MN 18 at Malmo
- North end: US 169 in Aitkin

Location
- Country: United States
- State: Minnesota
- Counties: Hennepin, Anoka, Isanti, Kanabec, Mille Lacs, Aitkin

Highway system
- Minnesota Trunk Highway System; Interstate; US; State; Legislative; Scenic
← MN 46	→ MN 48

Minnesota State Highway 47 (MN 47) is a 126.872-mile-long (204.181 km) highway in east–central Minnesota, which runs from its intersection with Central Avenue (State Highway 65) in Minneapolis and continues north to its northern terminus at its intersection with U.S. Highway 169 in Aitkin.

For part of its route (8 miles), it runs together with U.S. Highway 10 in Coon Rapids and Anoka. The two routes are concurrent from Foley Boulevard in Coon Rapids to Ferry Street (US 169) in Anoka.

Highway 47 also runs together with State Highway 18 for 9 miles in Mille Lacs and Aitkin counties around the northeast side of Mille Lacs Lake.

== Route description ==
State Highway 47 serves as a north–south route between Minneapolis, Fridley, Coon Rapids, Anoka, Ramsey, St. Francis, Ogilvie, Isle, and Aitkin in east–central Minnesota.

State Highway 47 begins at the intersection of Central Avenue (State Highway 65) and University Avenue in northeast Minneapolis. Highway 47 is signed locally as University Avenue in northeast Minneapolis. The route remains University Avenue NE through Columbia Heights and Fridley to its junction with Highways 10 and 610 at the Coon Rapids / Blaine boundary line.

The route is built as a divided highway north of its junction with 32nd Avenue NE / St. Anthony Parkway in Minneapolis. Highway 47 continues as a divided highway on its independent segment through Columbia Heights and Fridley. The route has an interchange with Interstate 694 in Fridley and another interchange with Highways 10 and 610 at the Coon Rapids / Blaine boundary line. Highway 47 joins the Highway 10 freeway at this point. Highways 10 and 47 run concurrent for 8 miles through Coon Rapids and Anoka.

Highway 47 leaves Highway 10 at its junction with Ferry Street in the city of Anoka. Highway 47 continues independently again northbound through the cities of Anoka and Ramsey as St. Francis Boulevard. The route continues north through the Anoka County communities of Nowthen and St. Francis.

The route enters Isanti County and passes through Bradford, Pine Brook, and Dalbo. Highway 47 has a junction with State Highway 95 at Pine Brook. Highway 47 enters Kanabec County and continues north to Ogilvie, where it has a junction with State Highway 23.

Highway 47 enters Mille Lacs County and joins State Highway 27 briefly to Isle at the southeast corner of Mille Lacs Lake. Father Hennepin State Park is located one mile west of the junction of Highway 47 and Highway 27 at Isle. The park entrance is located on Highway 27.

The route continues northbound around the east side of Mille Lacs Lake. Highway 47 has a junction with State Highway 18 in northeast Mille Lacs County. The route runs together with Highway 18 for 9 miles around the northeast side of the lake; continuing north to Malmo at the northeast corner of the lake.

Highway 47 continues independently for 21 miles between Malmo and the city of Aitkin. The route is also known as 4th Street SE in Aitkin. The northern terminus of Highway 47 is at its intersection with U.S. Highway 169 (Minnesota Avenue) in the city of Aitkin.

At the southern terminus of Highway 47 in northeast Minneapolis, "University Avenue" further extends itself into Saint Paul (as Ramsey County Road 34), ending at Lafayette Road. This section of "University Avenue" passes by landmarks such as the University of Minnesota and the Minnesota State Capitol.

== History ==
State Highway 47 was established in 1963.

Highway 47 was originally an extension of State Highway 56; which ran from southern Minnesota to Hampton; and then was concurrent with U.S. Highway 52 into downtown Saint Paul; then along University Avenue in both Saint Paul and Minneapolis. In 1963, State Highway 56 was terminated in downtown St. Paul and the section from Minneapolis north to Aitkin was renumbered State Highway 47.

Highway 47 was paved at the time it was created. Its predecessor was unpaved north of Anoka in 1940. By 1953, only the northerly section near Aitkin was still unpaved. It was completely paved by 1960.

The section of Highway 47 in Columbia Heights and Fridley was built as a divided highway by 1970.

== Major intersections ==
County	Location	mi	km	Destinations	Notes
Hennepin	Minneapolis	0.000	0.000	MN 65 (Central Avenue); University Avenue east	Southern terminus
Anoka	Fridley	7.528– 7.754	12.115– 12.479	I-694	I-694 exit 37; interchange.
Anoka	Coon Rapids	12.146– 12.620	19.547– 20.310	CSAH 10 / CR 3 (Coon Rapids Boulevard)	Interchange, Old US 10
Anoka	Coon Rapids	12.852– 13.041	20.683– 20.987	MN 610	Interchange
Anoka	Coon Rapids	13.076	21.044	US 10 east	South end of US 10 overlap
Anoka	Coon Rapids			CSAH 11 (Foley Boulevard)	Interchange
Anoka	Coon Rapids			CSAH 78 (Hanson Boulevard)	Single-point urban interchange
Anoka	Coon Rapids			CSAH 14 (Main Street)	Interchange; formerly MN 242
Anoka	Coon Rapids			CSAH 9 (Round Lake Boulevard)	Interchange
Anoka	Anoka			CSAH 7 (7th Avenue)	
Anoka	Anoka	20.662	33.252	US 10 west / US 169	North end of US 10 overlap
Isanti	Pine Brook	49.649	79.902	MN 95 – Princeton, Cambridge	
Kanabec	Ogilvie	67.906	109.284	MN 23 east – Mora	East end of MN 23 overlap
Kanabec	Ogilvie	68.988	111.025	MN 23 west – Milaca	West end of MN 23 overlap
Mille Lacs	Isle Harbor Township	89.023	143.269	MN 27 east / CR 131 – McGrath	South end of MN 27 overlap
Mille Lacs	Isle	91.189	146.754	MN 27 west / Lake Mille Lacs Scenic Byway – Wahkon, Onamia	North end of MN 27 overlap; south end of Lake Mille Lacs Scenic Byway overlap
Mille Lacs	East Side Township	96.481	155.271	MN 18 east	South end of MN 18 overlap
Aitkin	Malmo	105.615	169.971	MN 18 west / CSAH 2 / Lake Mille Lacs Scenic Byway – Garrison	North end of MN 18 / Lake Mille Lacs Scenic Byway overlap
Aitkin	Aitkin	126.872	204.181	US 169 to MN 210 – Garrison, Grand Rapids	Northern terminus
1.000 mi = 1.609 km; 1.000 km = 0.621 mi: Concurrency terminus
