= East Bethel, Minnesota =

City in Minnesota, United States

East Bethel
- City
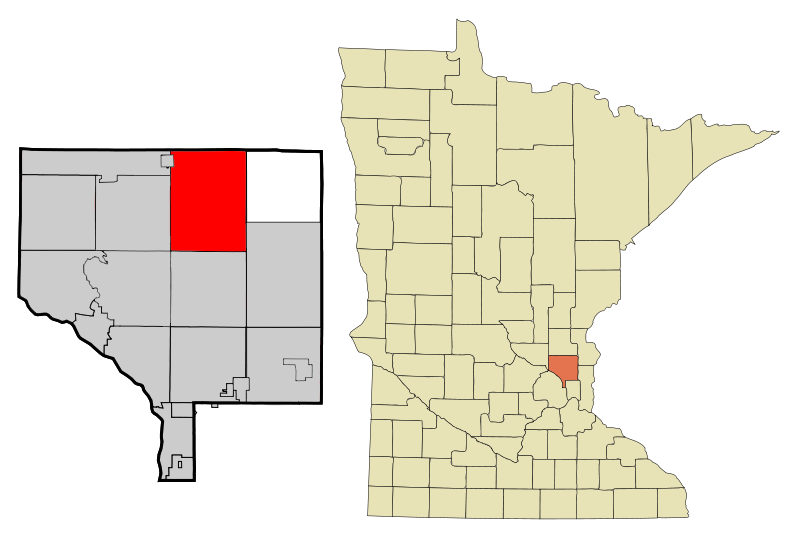
- Location of the city of East Bethel within Anoka County, Minnesota
- Coordinates: 45°21′20″N 93°12′14″W
- Country: United States
- State: Minnesota
- County: Anoka
- Incorporated (village): June 7, 1957
- Incorporated (city): January 1, 1974

Area
  - Total: 47.69 sq mi (123.52 km^{2})
  - Land: 44.58 sq mi (115.46 km^{2})
  - Water: 3.11 sq mi (8.06 km^{2})
- Elevation: 909 ft (277 m)

Population (2020)
  - Total: 11,786
  - Density: 264.4/sq mi (102.08/km^{2})
- Time zone: UTC-6 (Central (CST))
  - Summer (DST): UTC-5 (CDT)
- ZIP codes: 55005, 55011, 55092
- Area code: 763
- FIPS code: 27-17486
- GNIS feature ID: 2394596
- Website: www.ci.east-bethel.mn.us

East Bethel (/ˈbɛθəl/ BEH-thəl) is a city in Anoka County, Minnesota, United States. The population was 11,786 at the 2020 census.

Minnesota State Highway 65 and Anoka County Road 22 are the main routes in the city. Highway 65 runs north–south, and County Road 22 (Viking Boulevard) runs east–west.

== Geography ==
According to the United States Census Bureau, the city has an area of 47.97 square miles (124.24 km^{2}), of which 44.80 square miles (116.03 km^{2}) is land and 3.17 square miles (8.21 km^{2}) is water.

East Bethel is in the northern part of Anoka County. The city contains the primary site of the Cedar Creek Ecosystem Science Reserve

Central Minneapolis is 26 miles (42 km) to the southeast, along the Mississippi River, with the nearest international airport at Minneapolis-St. Paul, 34 miles (52 km) southeast.

=== Adjacent cities ===
- Columbus (southeast)
- Ham Lake (south)
- Andover (southwest)
- Oak Grove (west)
- St. Francis (northwest)
- Bethel (northwest)

The neighborhood of Coopers Corner is in northern East Bethel, and the neighborhood of Coon Lake Beach is in southeastern East Bethel.

== History ==
Linwood Township split from Bethel Township in 1871.

East Bethel was incorporated as a village on June 7, 1957, and was incorporated as the city of East Bethel on January 1, 1974.

The current boundaries of the City of East Bethel belonged to the Chippewa Indians until 1837, when the United States bought their lands east of the Mississippi River in what was later to become the State of Minnesota. Settlers began arriving in the area in the 1850s and the area was incorporated as a Township in 1858, the same year Minnesota was admitted to the Union. The Township was originally incorporated as the Township of Bethel, the name derived from the Bible and meaning the "House of God."

Situated in the northeast portion of Anoka County, the Quakers were the first settlers in Bethel in 1856. The group quickly established a school and a church, but left the area following the Indian Massacre of 1862. The Quakers took their families to Anoka and Minneapolis and never returned to the area. Other settlers that left during the Indian Wars did return to the area and became farmers, tradesmen, and merchants. The Township of Bethel exhibited a slow but steady growth from 423 in 1880 to 1,286 in 1957.

In spring of 1957, a local committee was formed to take the necessary legal steps to incorporate. On May 3, 1957, the petition was presented to the Anoka County Board of Commissioners and, as a result of the required election, incorporation was approved by 232 to 161 vote. This vote was challenged and the matter eventually was sent to the Minnesota Supreme Court and finally to the State Legislature for validation. East Bethel was officially incorporated as a Village on April 27, 1959 and as a City on January 1, 1974.

The City is approximately 48 square miles, which makes it the third largest City in the metro area in terms of size. As of the 2010 Census, there were 11,626 people residing in the City, comprising 4,060 households and 3,221 families. The population density is 259.5 inhabitants per square mile and there are 4,237 housing units at an average density of 94.6 per square mile.

== Demographics ==
Historical population
Census	Pop.	Note	%±
1860	128		—
1870	216		68.8%
1880	423		95.8%
1890	419		−0.9%
1900	617		47.3%
1910	617		0.0%
1920	682		10.5%
1930	668		−2.1%
1940	680		1.8%
1950	913		34.3%
1960	1,408		54.2%
1970	2,586		83.7%
1980	6,626		156.2%
1990	8,050		21.5%
2000	10,941		35.9%
2010	11,626		6.3%
2020	11,786		1.4%
U.S. Decennial Census

=== 2020 census ===
As of the 2020 census, East Bethel had a population of 11,786. The median age was 40.7 years. 22.2% of residents were under the age of 18 and 12.9% of residents were 65 years of age or older. For every 100 females there were 109.0 males, and for every 100 females age 18 and over there were 111.0 males age 18 and over.

1.8% of residents lived in urban areas, while 98.2% lived in rural areas.

There were 4,262 households in East Bethel, of which 32.0% had children under the age of 18 living in them. Of all households, 63.4% were married-couple households, 16.2% were households with a male householder and no spouse or partner present, and 11.1% were households with a female householder and no spouse or partner present. About 15.8% of all households were made up of individuals and 5.6% had someone living alone who was 65 years of age or older.

There were 4,424 housing units, of which 3.7% were vacant. The homeowner vacancy rate was 0.9% and the rental vacancy rate was 5.9%.

Racial composition as of the 2020 census
Race	Number	Percent
White	10,571	89.7%
Black or African American	69	0.6%
American Indian and Alaska Native	52	0.4%
Asian	311	2.6%
Native Hawaiian and Other Pacific Islander	6	0.1%
Some other race	117	1.0%
Two or more races	660	5.6%
Hispanic or Latino (of any race)	290	2.5%

=== 2010 census ===
As of the census of 2010, there were 11,626 people, 4,060 households, and 3,221 families living in the city. The population density was 259.5 inhabitants per square mile (100.2/km^{2}). There were 4,237 housing units at an average density of 94.6 per square mile (36.5/km^{2}). The racial makeup of the city was 95.9% White, 0.4% African American, 0.5% Native American, 1.6% Asian, 0.3% from other races, and 1.3% from two or more races. Hispanic or Latino of any race were 1.0% of the population.

There were 4,060 households, of which 39.6% had children under the age of 18 living with them, 66.9% were married couples living together, 6.6% had a female householder with no husband present, 5.8% had a male householder with no wife present, and 20.7% were non-families. 14.4% of all households were made up of individuals, and 3.6% had someone living alone who was 65 years of age or older. The average household size was 2.86 and the average family size was 3.15.

The median age in the city was 38.6 years. 26.2% of residents were under the age of 18; 7.9% were between the ages of 18 and 24; 26.8% were from 25 to 44; 31.9% were from 45 to 64; and 7% were 65 years of age or older. The gender makeup of the city was 52.2% male and 47.8% female.

=== 2000 census ===
As of the census of 2000, there were 10,941 people, 3,607 households, and 2,936 families living in the city. The population density was 243.9 inhabitants per square mile (94.2/km^{2}). There were 3,718 housing units at an average density of 82.9 per square mile (32.0/km^{2}). The racial makeup of the city was 97.55% White, 0.19% African American, 0.43% Native American, 0.45% Asian, 0.32% from other races, and 1.06% from two or more races. Hispanic or Latino of any race were 0.95% of the population.

There were 3,607 households, out of which 47.2% had children under the age of 18 living with them, 70.6% were married couples living together, 6.1% had a female householder with no husband present, and 18.6% were non-families. 13.6% of all households were made up of individuals, and 2.8% had someone living alone who was 65 years of age or older. The average household size was 3.03 and the average family size was 3.33.

In the city, the population was spread out, with 32.1% under the age of 18, 6.9% from 18 to 24, 36.9% from 25 to 44, 20.0% from 45 to 64, and 4.0% who were 65 years of age or older. The median age was 33 years. For every 100 females, there were 108.1 males. For every 100 females age 18 and over, there were 109.5 males.

The median income for a household in the city was $57,880, and the median income for a family was $62,004. Males had a median income of $40,599 versus $27,377 for females. The per capita income for the city was $21,087. About 2.2% of families and 3.8% of the population were below the poverty line, including 4.1% of those under age 18 and 8.3% of those age 65 or over.

== City leadership ==
Current leadership of the city includes the following people:

- City Administrator: Matt Look
- Mayor: Ardie Anderson
- Council Members:
  - Suzanne Erkel
  - Tim Miller
  - Jim Smith
  - Brian Mundle

=== Controversies ===
==== 2025 social media comments ====
In June 2025, following the fatal shootings of former Minnesota House Speaker Melissa Hortman, her husband Mark, and their Golden Retriever, Gilbert, Council Member Suzanne Erkel posted a comment on her personal Facebook page stating, "It's a warning to all Democrats, [toe] the line or else."

The comment drew significant public backlash and calls for her resignation from residents, who described the rhetoric as dangerous and inflammatory during a packed city council meeting. Erkel defended her post at the meeting, stating that her intention was to express concern about growing political retaliation and public safety rather than to stir discord, adding that she had subsequently faced threats and harassment.

East Bethel City Administrator Matt Look defended Erkel in a statement to the press, noting that she was not acting in an official capacity for the city and was exercising her First Amendment rights. The Anoka County Sheriff's Office investigated the comment following public complaints but found no actionable threat.

== Transportation ==
- Minnesota State Highway 65
- Anoka County Road 22
