= Anoka County, Minnesota =

County in Minnesota, United States

- County
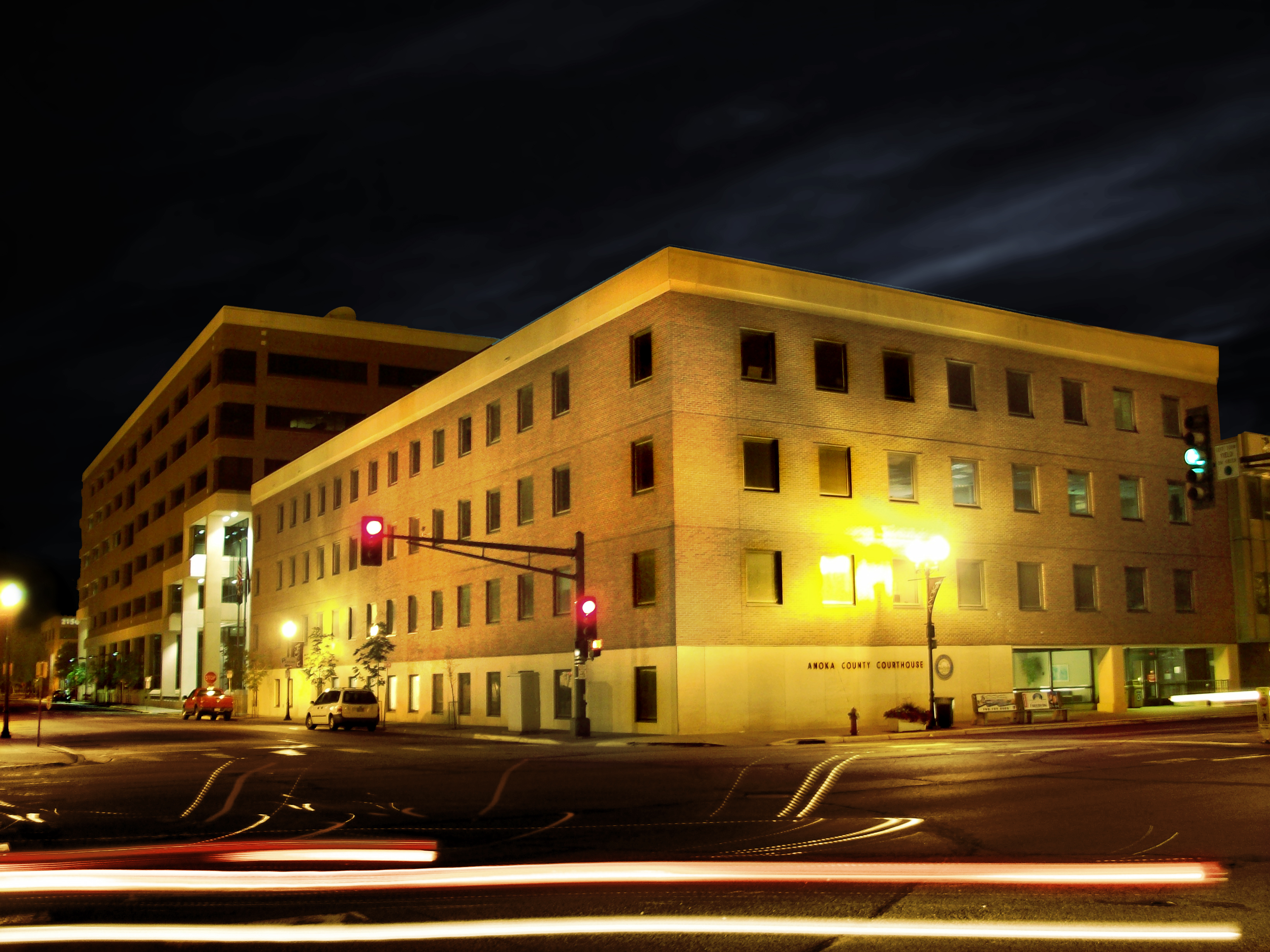
- The Anoka County Courthouse and Government Center in downtown Anoka, July 2009

- Location within the U.S. state of Minnesota
- Coordinates: 45°16′N 93°14′W
- Country: United States
- State: Minnesota
- Founded: May 23, 1857
- Named for: City of Anoka
- Seat: Anoka
- Largest city: Blaine

Area
  - Total: 446 sq mi (1,160 km^{2})
  - Land: 423 sq mi (1,100 km^{2})
  - Water: 23 sq mi (60 km^{2}) 5.2%

Population (2020)
  - Total: 363,887
  - Estimate (2025): 381,605 ▲
  - Density: 862/sq mi (333/km^{2})
- Time zone: UTC−6 (Central)
  - Summer (DST): UTC−5 (CDT)
- Congressional districts: 3rd, 5th, 6th
- Website: www.anokacountymn.gov

Anoka County (/əˈnoʊkə/ ə-NOH-kə) is the fourth-most populous county in the U.S. state of Minnesota. As of the 2020 census, its population was 363,887. The county seat and namesake of the county is the city of Anoka, which is derived from the Dakota word anoka, meaning "on (or from) both sides", referring to its location on both banks of the Rum River. The county's largest city is Blaine, the tenth-largest city in Minnesota and sixth-largest Twin Cities suburb.

Anoka County comprises the north portion of the Minneapolis–Saint Paul statistical area, the state's largest metropolitan area and the 16th-largest in the United States, with about 3.64 million residents.

The county is bordered by the counties of Isanti on the north, Chisago and Washington on the east, Hennepin and Ramsey on the south, Sherburne on the west, and the Mississippi River on the southwest. The Rum River cuts through the county and was the site of many early European settlements. It was a common route to the Mille Lacs Lake, the spiritual homeland of the Ojibwe people. Father Louis Hennepin traveled the river in his first exploration of the region. The area became a center of fur trade and logging as French and French Canadian communities grew in Anoka and Centerville. Organized in 1857, the county's southern border eventually met Minneapolis and has become a predominantly suburban area since Interstate 35W was built. The county is home to destinations such as the Heights Theater in Columbia Heights and Northtown Mall and the National Sports Center in Blaine.

Soils of Anoka County

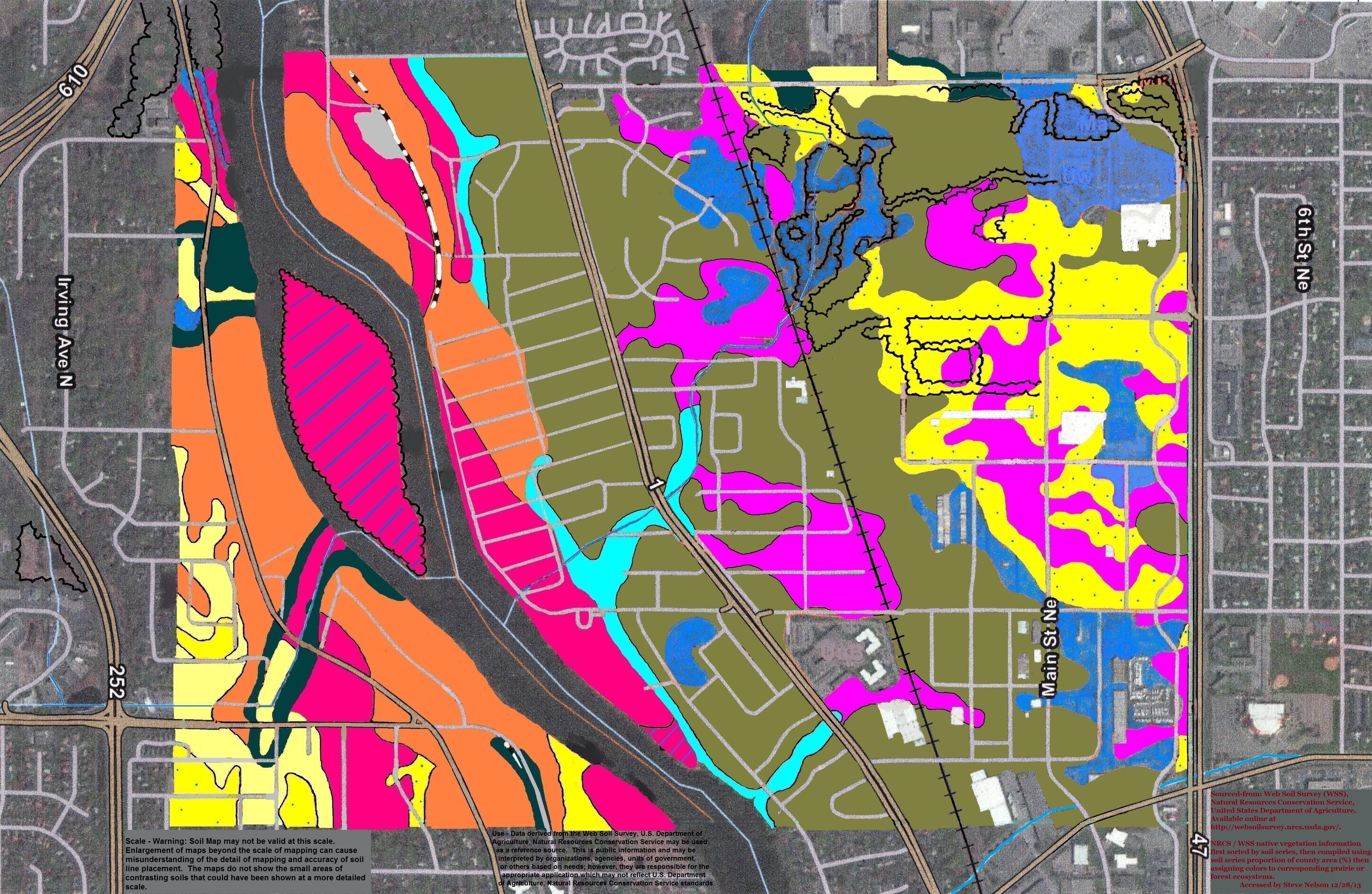
Soils of Springbrook Nature Center area

== History ==
Anoka County was organized by an act of the Minnesota Territorial Legislature on May 23, 1857, the year before Minnesota's admission to the Union. It was formed from parts of Ramsey County and Benton County; the Rum River previously formed the line between the two counties. The boundaries were mainly the same as they are now, except for a small part of the southeastern tip along the Mississippi River and at the south, formerly known as Manomin County. It was a small portion that connected to Ramsey and occupied one-third of the congressional township. It was attached to Anoka County by constitutional amendment on November 2, 1869, and became known as Fridley in 1879.

The first European descendants to explore what is now Anoka County were Franciscan friar Louis Hennepin and his party. Fur traders soon began to settle the area that is now Ramsey County. They settled on the Rum River and more people were attracted to the area now called Anoka.

== Geography ==
The Mississippi River flows southeasterly along the county's southwestern boundary. The Rum River flows southerly through the western part of the county, discharging into the Mississippi at the county's southwestern boundary. The terrain consists of low, rolling, wooded hills. The terrain slopes to the south and east; its highest point is a small hillock 1.2 miles (1.9 km) east of the county's northwest corner, at 1,100 ft (340 m) ASL. Otherwise the terrain's highest point is along the western part of the north boundary line, at 1,083 ft (330 m) ASL. The county has an area of 446 square miles (1,160 km^{2}), of which 23 square miles (60 km^{2}) (5.2%) are covered by water.

=== Lakes ===
- Baldwin Lake
- Bunker Lake
- Cedar Lake
- Centerville Lake
- Coon Lake
- Crooked Lake
- Fawn Lake
- George Watch Lake
- Golden Lake
- Ham Lake
- Island Lake
- Laddie Lake
- Lake George
- Linwood lake
- Marshan Lake
- Martin Lake
- McKay Lake
- Moore Lake
- Peltier Lake
- Reshanau Lake
- Rice Lake
- Round Lake
- Sherman Lake
- Spring Lake
- Smith Lake
- Wards Lake

=== Waterways ===
- Cedar Creek
- Coon Creek
- Crooked Brook
- Ford Brook
- Hardwood Creek
- Mahoney Brook
- Mississippi River
- Rice Creek
- Rum River
- Sand Creek
- Seelye Brook
- Trott Brook
- Pheasant creek

=== Major highways ===
- Interstate 35
- Interstate 35E
- Interstate 35W
- Interstate 694
- US Highway 10
- US Highway 169
- Minnesota State Highway 47
- Minnesota State Highway 65
- Minnesota State Highway 97
- Minnesota State Highway 610
- List of county roads

=== Adjacent counties ===
- Isanti County - north
- Chisago County - northeast
- Washington County - east
- Ramsey County - southeast
- Hennepin County - southwest
- Sherburne County - northwest

=== Protected areas ===
- Bethel Wildlife Management Area
- Boot Lake Scientific and Natural Area
- Bunker Hills Regional Park
- Carl E Bonnell Wildlife Management Area
- Carlos Avery State Wildlife Management Area
- Cedar Creek Conservation Area
- Coon Rapids Dam Regional Park
- East Bethel Booster Park
- Gordie Mikkelson Wildlife Management Area
- Helen Allison Savanna Scientific and Natural Area
- Lake George Regional Park
- Martin Island-Linwood Lakes Regional Park
- Mississippi National River and Recreation Area (part)
- Rice Creek Chain of Lakes Park Preserve
- Robert and Marilyn Burman Wildlife Management Area

== Climate and weather ==
Anoka, Minnesota

Climate chart (precipitation, max. and min. temperature)
J	F	M	A	M	J	J	A	S	O	N	D
1 23 5	0.9 29 10	1.8 41 22	3 58 35	3.7 70 46	4.4 77 56	4.5 81 61	4.4 78 59	3.9 70 50	2.8 57 38	2 40 25	1.2 26 10
- █ Average max. and min. temperatures in °F
- █ Precipitation totals in inches
- Source: The Weather Channel
Metric conversion
J	F	M	A	M	J	J	A	S	O	N	D
24 −5 −15	22 −2 −12	46 5 −6	76 14 2	94 21 8	111 25 13	113 27 16	110 26 15	100 21 10	71 14 3	50 4 −4	31 −3 −12
- █ Average max. and min. temperatures in °C
- █ Precipitation totals in mm

Anoka County has a hot-summer humid continental climate zone (Dfa in the Köppen climate classification), typical of southern parts of the Upper Midwest, and is situated in USDA plant hardiness zone 4b. As is typical in a continental climate, the difference between average temperatures in the coldest winter month and the warmest summer month is great: 60.1 °F (33.4 °C). In recent years, average temperatures in the county seat of Anoka have ranged from 5 °F (−15 °C) in January to 81 °F (27 °C) in July. A record low of −50 °F (−46 °C) was recorded in January 2019 and a record high of 103 °F (39 °C) in July 1988. Average monthly precipitation ranged from 0.87 inches (22 mm) in February to 4.45 inches (113 mm) in July.

== Demographics ==
Historical population
Census	Pop.	Note	%±
1860	2,106		—
1870	3,940		87.1%
1880	7,108		80.4%
1890	9,884		39.1%
1900	11,313		14.5%
1910	12,493		10.4%
1920	15,626		25.1%
1930	18,415		17.8%
1940	22,443		21.9%
1950	35,579		58.5%
1960	85,916		141.5%
1970	154,712		80.1%
1980	195,998		26.7%
1990	243,641		24.3%
2000	298,084		22.3%
2010	330,844		11.0%
2020	363,887		10.0%
2025 (est.)	381,605	▲	4.9%
U.S. Decennial Census; 1790-1960 1900-1990; 1990-2000 2010-2020

=== Racial and ethnic composition ===
Anoka County, Minnesota – Racial and ethnic composition Note: the US Census treats Hispanic/Latino as an ethnic category. This table excludes Latinos from the racial categories and assigns them to a separate category. Hispanics/Latinos may be of any race.
Race / Ethnicity (NH = Non-Hispanic)	Pop 1980	Pop 1990	Pop 2000	Pop 2010	Pop 2020	% 1980	% 1990	% 2000	% 2010	% 2020
White alone (NH)	191,418	235,340	276,586	281,929	276,205	97.66%	96.59%	92.79%	85.22%	75.90%
Black or African American alone (NH)	380	1,266	4,683	14,282	28,378	0.19%	0.52%	1.57%	4.32%	7.80%
Native American or Alaska Native alone (NH)	1,112	1,799	1,970	1,994	1,912	0.57%	0.74%	0.66%	0.60%	0.53%
Asian alone (NH)	1,496	2,876	5,010	12,796	19,158	0.76%	1.18%	1.68%	3.87%	5.26%
Native Hawaiian or Pacific Islander alone (NH)	x	x	60	91	93	x	x	0.02%	0.03%	0.03%
Other race alone (NH)	311	91	294	378	1,401	0.16%	0.04%	0.10%	0.11%	0.39%
Mixed race or Multiracial (NH)	x	x	4,520	7,354	17,234	x	x	1.52%	2.22%	4.74%
Hispanic or Latino (any race)	1,281	2,269	4,961	12,020	19,506	0.65%	0.93%	1.66%	3.63%	5.36%
Total	195,998	243,641	298,084	330,844	363,887	100.00%	100.00%	100.00%	100.00%	100.00%

=== 2020 census ===
As of the 2020 census, the county had a population of 363,887. The median age was 38.6 years. 24.2% of residents were under the age of 18 and 14.3% of residents were 65 years of age or older. For every 100 females there were 99.3 males, and for every 100 females age 18 and over there were 98.1 males age 18 and over.

The racial makeup of the county was 77.0% White, 7.9% Black or African American, 0.7% American Indian and Alaska Native, 5.3% Asian, <0.1% Native Hawaiian and Pacific Islander, 2.6% from some other race, and 6.5% from two or more races. Hispanic or Latino residents of any race comprised 5.4% of the population.

84.1% of residents lived in urban areas, while 15.9% lived in rural areas.

There were 133,879 households in the county, of which 33.4% had children under the age of 18 living in them. Of all households, 54.2% were married-couple households, 16.0% were households with a male householder and no spouse or partner present, and 22.1% were households with a female householder and no spouse or partner present. About 22.5% of all households were made up of individuals and 9.2% had someone living alone who was 65 years of age or older.

There were 138,017 housing units, of which 3.0% were vacant. Among occupied housing units, 79.4% were owner-occupied and 20.6% were renter-occupied. The homeowner vacancy rate was 0.7% and the rental vacancy rate was 5.4%.

=== 2010 census ===
As of the census of 2010, 330,844 people were in the county.

=== 2000 census ===
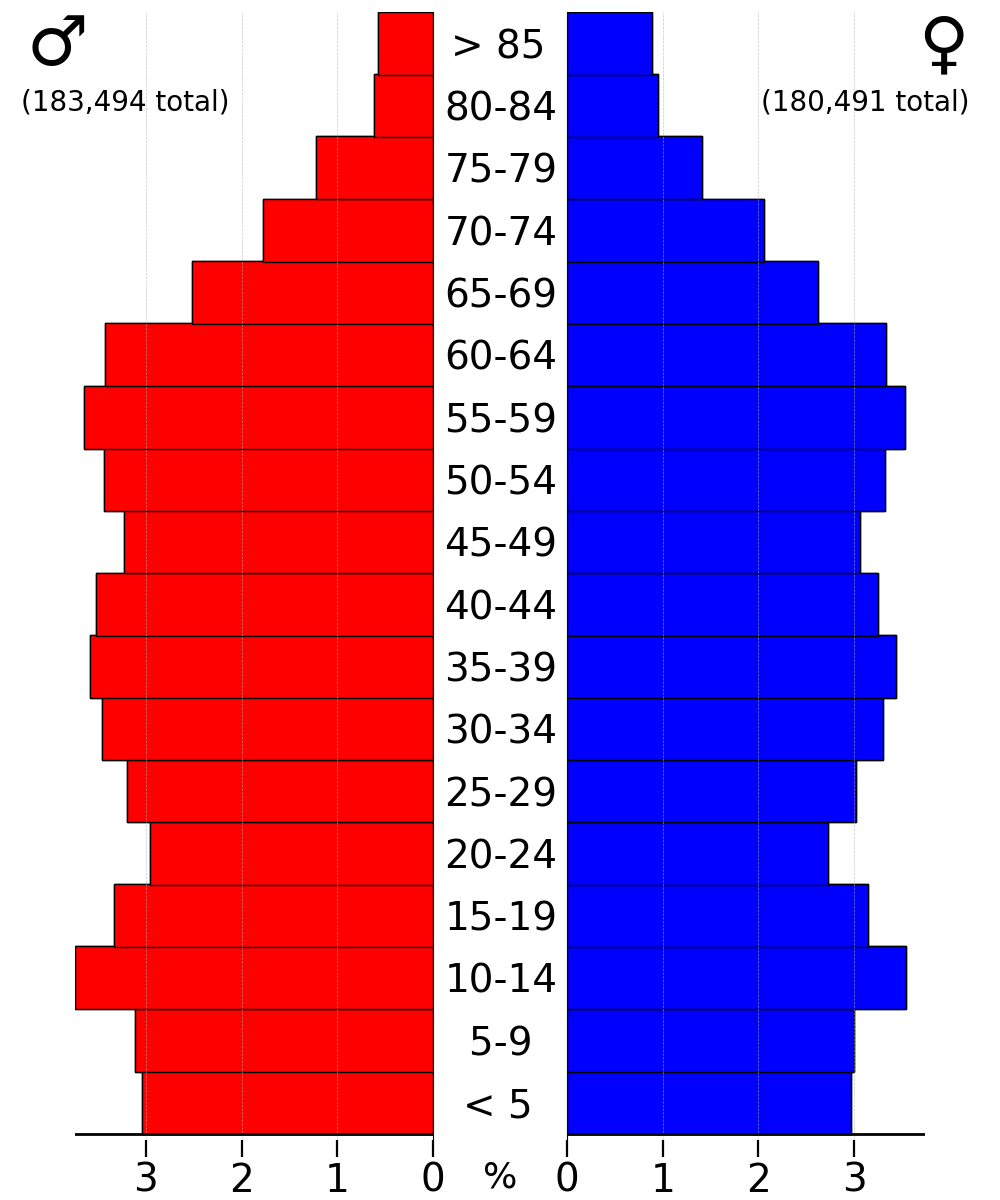
2022 US Census population pyramid for Anoka County, from ACS 5-year estimates

As of the census of 2000, 298,084 people, 106,428 households, and 79,395 families resided in the county. The population density was 705 per square mile (272/km^{2}). The 108,091 housing units had an average density of 256 per square mile (99/km^{2}).

At the time of the 2000 Census, the racial makeup of the county was 93.64% White, 1.60% African American, 0.70% Native American, 1.69% Asian, 0.67% from other races, and 1.71 percent from two or more races; 1.66% of the population were Hispanics or Latinos of any race. The 2000 Census found 30.2% were of German, 14.3% Norwegian, 9.0% Swedish, 7.3% Irish, and 5.9% Polish ancestry.

Of the 106,428 households, 39.9% had children under 18 living with them, 60.7% were married couples living together, 9.8% had a female householder with no husband present, and 25.4% were not families. About 19.3% were made up of individuals, and 5.3% had someone living alone who was 65 or older. The average household size was 2.77, and the average family size was 3.19.

The county's age distribution was 28.9% under 18, 8.3% from 18 to 24, 34.1% from 25 to 44, 21.6% from 45 to 64, and 7.1% who were 65 or older. The median age was 34 years. For every 100 females, there were 101.10 males. For every 100 females 18 and over, there were 99.30 males.

The median income for a household in the county was $57,754, and for a family was $64,261. Males had a median income of $41,527 versus $30,534 for females. The per capita income for the county was $23,297. About 2.90% of families and 4.20% of the population were below the poverty line, including 4.90% of those under age 18 and 4.50% of those age 65 or over.

== Government and politics ==
Anoka County was once one of the most Democratic suburban counties in the United States but has trended Republican in the 21st century. The county has voted for the Republican presidential nominee each time since 2000, though sometimes by close margins. At the same time, Incumbent Democratic-Farmer-Labor Senator Amy Klobuchar defeated Jim Newberger by over 20,000 votes there in the 2018 midterms; Klobuchar also won the county in 2006, 2012, and 2024. Republican nominee Karin Housley narrowly defeated Democratic incumbent Tina Smith in the concurrent Senate special election in 2018; Smith won the election by over 10 points. Incumbent Democratic-Farmer-Labor Governor Tim Walz also won Anoka County in his 2018 gubernatorial bid by fewer than 300 votes, but the county flipped to Republican in the 2022 gubernatorial election.

=== County commissioners ===
As of April 2023:

- District 1 - Matt Look
- District 2 - Julie Braastad
- District 3 - Jeff Reinert
- District 4 - Scott Schulte
- District 5 - Mike Gamache
- District 6 - Julie Jeppson
- District 7 - Mandy Meisner

=== National elections ===
United States presidential election results for Anoka County, Minnesota
Year	Republican		Democratic		Third party(ies)	
Year	No.	%	No.	%	No.	%
1892	1,002	52.76%	720	37.91%	177	9.32%
1896	1,553	64.90%	791	33.05%	49	2.05%
1900	1,511	70.87%	555	26.03%	66	3.10%
1904	1,557	82.25%	283	14.95%	53	2.80%
1908	1,577	68.99%	610	26.68%	99	4.33%
1912	562	27.03%	591	28.43%	926	44.54%
1916	1,262	48.95%	1,171	45.42%	145	5.62%
1920	3,505	72.13%	865	17.80%	489	10.06%
1924	3,146	57.15%	458	8.32%	1,901	34.53%
1928	3,816	59.05%	2,571	39.79%	75	1.16%
1932	2,718	38.00%	4,253	59.47%	181	2.53%
1936	2,586	32.70%	4,501	56.91%	822	10.39%
1940	4,302	43.53%	5,501	55.66%	80	0.81%
1944	3,958	41.80%	5,431	57.36%	79	0.83%
1948	3,853	32.30%	7,730	64.80%	346	2.90%
1952	7,425	44.09%	9,344	55.49%	70	0.42%
1956	9,359	44.37%	11,697	55.46%	36	0.17%
1960	14,114	40.90%	20,324	58.89%	73	0.21%
1964	13,201	29.33%	31,714	70.47%	90	0.20%
1968	16,358	32.63%	30,656	61.15%	3,120	6.22%
1972	29,546	49.77%	28,031	47.22%	1,783	3.00%
1976	27,863	35.58%	48,173	61.51%	2,279	2.91%
1980	33,100	37.68%	45,532	51.83%	9,211	10.49%
1984	46,578	47.80%	50,305	51.63%	557	0.57%
1988	46,853	44.28%	57,953	54.77%	1,003	0.95%
1992	39,458	30.35%	54,621	42.01%	35,941	27.64%
1996	41,745	33.66%	63,756	51.41%	18,521	14.93%
2000	69,256	47.56%	68,008	46.70%	8,355	5.74%
2004	91,853	52.77%	80,226	46.09%	1,987	1.14%
2008	91,357	50.13%	86,976	47.73%	3,891	2.14%
2012	93,430	50.11%	88,614	47.52%	4,421	2.37%
2016	93,339	50.25%	75,500	40.64%	16,919	9.11%
2020	104,902	49.69%	100,893	47.79%	5,337	2.53%
2024	106,974	50.82%	97,667	46.40%	5,840	2.77%

== Communities ==
=== Cities ===
- Andover
- Anoka
- Bethel
- Blaine (partially in Ramsey County)
- Centerville
- Circle Pines
- Columbia Heights
- Columbus
- Coon Rapids
- East Bethel
- Fridley
- Ham Lake
- Hilltop
- Lexington
- Lino Lakes
- Nowthen
- Oak Grove
- Ramsey
- Saint Francis (partially in Isanti County)
- Spring Lake Park (partially in Ramsey County)

=== Township ===
- Linwood Township

=== Census-designated place ===
- Martin Lake

=== Unincorporated community ===
- Linwood

== Education ==
School districts include:

- Anoka-Hennepin School District
- Centennial Public School District
- Columbia Heights Public School District
- Elk River School District
- Forest Lake Public School District
- Fridley Public School District
- Spring Lake Park Public Schools
- St. Francis Area Schools
- White Bear Lake Area School District

== See also ==
- Anoka County History Center
- National Register of Historic Places listings in Anoka County, Minnesota
- List of Minnesota placenames of Native American origin
