= List of county roads in Kanabec County, Minnesota =

- Standard county road marker

Highway names
- Interstates: Interstate X (I-X)
- US Highways: U.S. Highway X (US X)
- State: Trunk Highway X (MN X or TH X)
- County State-Aid Highways: County State-Aid Highway X (CSAH X)
- County Roads: County Road X (CR X)

System links
- County roads of Minnesota; Kanabec County

The following is an incomplete list of county-maintained roads in Kanabec County, Minnesota, United States. Though some of them are county state aid highways (CSAH), all Kanabec County highways bear the black and white standard square shield for County Routes rather than having the CSAH bearing the blue and gold pentagonal M1-6 shield for those that are CSAH designated routes.

== CR 1–CR 30 ==
County Road 1 is a route servicing Mora, Arthur Township and Comfort Township. The route begins at its intersection with Walnut Street (CR 17), heads east on Howe Avenue, heads concurrently south 1 mile (1.6 km) on Mahogany Street (CR 11), heads east 6 miles (9.7 km) on 195th Avenue and terminates at the county line. The road continues east as Pine CR 11.

County Road 2 is a route servicing Brunswick Township. The route begins at its intersection with CR 12, heads east 3.5 miles (5.6 km) on 145th Avenue, and terminates at its intersection with State Highway 65 (MN 65).

County Road 3 is a route servicing Hillman Township, Peace Township and Pomroy Township.

The route begins as a continuation of Mille Lacs CR 126 at its intersection with State Highway 47 (MN 47), heads generally east 7.2 miles (11.6 km) on 290th Avenue, heads concurrently north 1 mile (1.6 km) on State Highway 65 (MN 65), heads east 11 miles (18 km) on 300th Avenue and terminates at the county line. The road continues east as Pine CR 18.

County Road 4 is a route servicing South Fork Township, Brunswick Township and Grass Lake Township in Kanabec County and Stanchfield Township in Isanti County. The northern segment of the route begins as a continuation of Mille Lacs CR 2, heads east 1 mile (1.6 km) on 110th Avenue, heads north 1 mile (1.6 km) on Bear Street, heads north 4 miles (6.4 km) on 120th Avenue, heads concurrently north 0.5 miles (0.80 km) on State Highway 47 (MN 47), heads east 2 miles (3.2 km) on 125th Avenue, heads south and east 1.1 miles (1.8 km) on 125th Avenue and 120th Avenue, heads south 0.75 miles (1.21 km) on Imperial Street, heads east 2 miles (3.2 km) on 113th Avenue, heads south 1 mile (1.6 km) on King Road, heads east 3.7 miles (6.0 km) on 103rd Avenue, and terminates at its intersection with State Highway 65 (MN 65). A 0.2 miles (0.32 km) long spur associated with the northern segment also exists, connecting 103rd Avenue with MN 65 and CR 7 along Nightingale Street. Approximately 1 mile (1.6 km) southeast of the eastern terminus of the northern segment along MN 65 is Isanti CR 4, which heads northeast to the county line, heads east on 421st Avenue becoming the southern segment of Kanabec CR 4 for 1 mile (1.6 km) before the route turns back to becoming Isanti CR 4.

County Road 5 is a route servicing Grass Lake Township, Grasston, Comfort Township, Whited Township, Quamba, Pomroy Township, Kroschel Township and Kroschel. The route begins at its intersection with State Highway 70 (MN 70) as a continuation of Queen Street (CR 43), heads north on Queen Street, heads east on 143rd Avenue, heads generally north 7.4 miles (11.9 km) on Rainbow Street, heads west 1.25 miles (2.01 km) on 210th Avenue, heads north 1 mile (1.6 km) on Poplar Street, heads concurrently northeast on State Highway 23 (MN 23), heads north on Quamba Street, heads east on Whited Avenue, heads north 1.25 miles (2.01 km) on Quarter Street, heads east 1 mile (1.6 km) on 240th Avenue, heads generally north 8.2 miles (13.2 km) on Rainbow Street, heads east 1 mile (1.6 km) on 320th Avenue, heads north 1 mile (1.6 km) on Skyview Street, heads generally east 1 mile (1.6 km) on 330th Avenue, and terminates at its intersection with Velvet Street (CR 20).

County Road 6 is a route servicing Mora, Arthur Township and Kanabec Township. The route begins at its intersection with State Highways 65 and 23 (MN 65) / (MN 23), heads west on Forest Avenue East, heads north on North Union Street, heads west on Maple Avenue West, heads generally west 6 miles (9.7 km) on 205th Avenue and 210th Avenue, and terminates at its intersection with State Highway 47 (MN 47).

County Road 7 is a route servicing Grass Lake Township. The route begins at its intersection with State Highway 65 (MN 65), heads north 1.8 miles (2.9 km) on Nightingale Street, heads east 1.8 miles (2.9 km) on 120th Avenue, heads north 2 miles (3.2 km) on Olympic Street and terminates at its intersection with State Highway 70 (MN 70).

County Road 8 is a route servicing Arthur Township, Knife Lake Township and Hillman Township. The route begins at its intersection with 205th Avenue (CR 6), heads generally north 8.8 miles (14.2 km) on Jade Street, and terminates at its intersection with 290th Avenue (CR 8).

County Road 10 is a route servicing South Fork Township, Kanabec Township, Ogilvie and Ann Lake Township. The route begins at its intersection with 120th Avenue (CR 4), heads north and east 3.25 miles (5.23 km) on Delta Street, heads east 0.75 miles (1.21 km) on 150th Avenue, heads north and east 2.3 miles (3.7 km) on Eagle Street, and Hill Avenue within Ogilvie, then southwest on George Street. In Ogilvie, a spur CR 10 extends east from Hill Avenue to State Highway 23 (MN 23) along Rutherford Street. Leaving Ogilvie, CR 10 along George Street becomes 170th Avenue, heads west 2 miles (3.2 km), heads north 6 miles (9.7 km) on Cable Street, and terminates at its intersection with 230th Avenue (CR 26).

County Road 11 is a route servicing Brunswick Township, Grass Lake Township, Arthur Township, Comfort Township, Mora, Whited Township and Peace Township. The route begins at its intersection with State Highway 65 (MN 65), heads north 8.1 miles (13.0 km) on Mahogany Street, heads concurrently northeast on State Highway 23 (MN 23), heads north 2.1 miles (3.4 km) on Naples Street, heads east 1 mile (1.6 km) on 230th Avenue, heads generally north 7.3 miles (11.7 km) on Olympic Street, and terminates at its intersection with 300th Avenue (CR 3).

County Road 12 is a route servicing Lewis Lake, Brunswick Township and Arthur Township. The route begins at its intersection with 125th Avenue (CR 4), heads north 7.5 miles (12.1 km) on Harbor Street, heads east 1.25 miles (2.01 km) then north 0.5 miles (0.80 km) on 200th Avenue, and terminating at its intersection with 210th Avenue (CR 6).

County Road 13 is a route servicing Kanabec Township and South Fork Township. The route begins at its intersection with State Highway 23 (MN 23), briefly heads north on Cable Street, heads west on 160th Avenue, and terminates at the county line. The road continues west as Mille Lacs CR 11.

County Road 14 is a route servicing Arthur Township. The route begins at its intersection with State Highway 65 (MN 65), generally heads west and north on Fish Lake Road, following the southern and western shores Fish Lake, and terminates at its intersection with State Highway 23 (MN 23).

County Road 15 is a route serving Hillman Township. The route begins at its intersection with 290th Avenue (CR 3), heads north 3 miles (4.8 km) on Harbor Street, heads west 3 miles (4.8 km) on 320th Avenue, and terminates at its intersection with State Highway 47 (MN 47).

County Road 16 is a route serving Brunswick Township and Coin. The route begins as a continuation of Isanti CR 14, heads north 3.5 miles (5.6 km), east 0.5 miles (0.80 km) and north 0.3 miles (0.48 km) on King Road, terminating at its intersection with State Highway 65 (MN 65).

County Road 17 is a route servicing Grasston, Grass Lake Township, Comfort Township, Brunswick Township, Arthur Township and Mora. The route begins at its intersection with State Highway 107 (MN 107), generally heads west on Pine Street and 143rd Avenue, heads north on Porter Street, heads west on 145th Avenue, heads northwest and then north on Plum Street, heads west 2.5 miles (4.0 km) on 155th Avenue, heads north 0.5 miles (0.80 km) on Naples Street, heads west 1 mile (1.6 km) on 160th Avenue, briefly heads concurrently south on Mahogany Street (CR 11), continues to generally heads west 1 mile (1.6 km) on 160th Avenue, generally heads north 1 mile (1.6 km) on Liberty Street and then South Walnut Street, and terminates at its intersection with State Highway 23 (MN 23).

County Road 18 is a route servicing Comfort Township and Arthur Township. The route begins at its intersection with Plum Street (CR 5), heads west 3.75 miles (6.04 km) on 130th Avenue, heads north 0.5 miles (0.80 km) on Naples Street, heads west 1.75 miles (2.82 km) on 135th Avenue, and terminates at its intersection with Mahogany Street (CR 11).

County Road 19 is a route servicing Whited Township and Knife Lake Township. The southern segment begins at its intersection with Rainbow Street (CR 5), heads west 5.45 miles (8.77 km) on 250th Avenue, and terminates at its intersection with State Highway 65 (MN 65). The northern segment begins 1 mile (1.6 km) north of the terminal of the southern segment at MN 65, generally heads west 2.7 miles (4.3 km) on 260th Avenue, and terminates at its intersection with Jade Street (CR 8).

County Road 20 is a route servicing Pomroy Township, Kroschel Township and Kroschel. The route begins as a continuation of Pine CR 13, heads north 1 mile (1.6 km) on Usher Street, heads west 0.5 miles (0.80 km) on 280th Avenue, heads north 4 miles (6.4 km) on Uniform Street, heads east 1 mile (1.6 km) on 320th Avenue, heads north 7 miles (11 km) on Velvet Street. The road continues into Aitkin County as CR 25.

County Road 21 is a route servicing Kroschel Township. The route begins at its intersection with Velvet Street (CR 20), heads east on 355th Avenue for 1 mile (1.6 km) to the county line. The road continues into Pine County as Grindstone Lake Road (CR 27).

County Road 22 is a route servicing South Fork Township in Kanabec County and Dalbo Township in Isanti County. The route begins as a continuation of Isanti CR 22, heads west and north on 421st Avenue Northwest, and terminates at its intersection with State Highway 47 (MN 47).

County Road 23 is a short route in Grasston. The route begins at the intersection of State Highway 107 (MN 107) and Pine Street (CR 17), briefly heads east and north on Pine Street, terminating at the county line. The road continues east and north into Pine County as Pokegama Lake Road (CR 7). This road is signed as Pine CR 7 instead of as Kanabec CR 23.

County Road 24 is a route servicing Peace Township and Ford Township. The route begins at its intersection with State Highway 65 (MN 65), heads east 2.5 miles (4.0 km) on 310th Avenue, heads north 2.2 miles (3.5 km) on Nightingale Street, heads west 2.5 miles (4.0 km) on 330th Avenue and terminates at its intersection with Highway 65.

County Road 25 is a route servicing Hillman Township and Peace Township. The route begins at its intersection with Harbor Street (CR 15), heads east 4 miles (6.4 km) on 315th Avenue, and terminates at its intersection with State Highway 65 (MN 65).

County Road 26 is a route servicing Ann Lake Township and Knife Lake Township. The route begins at the county line as a continuation of Mille Lacs CR 24, heads east 4 miles (6.4 km) on 230th Avenue, heads concurrently north 1 mile (1.6 km) on State Highway 47 (MN 47), heads east 5 miles (8.0 km) on 240th Avenue, and terminates at its intersection with Jade Street (CR 8).

County Road 27 is a route servicing Mora. The route begins at the intersection of State Highways 65 and 23 (MN 65) / (MN 23), heads north on South Union Street and terminates at its intersection with Forest Avenue East (CR 6.

County Road 28 is a route servicing Grass Lake Township. The route begins at the intersection of State Highway 107 (MN 107) and 133rd Avenue (CR 42), briefly heads east on 133rd Avenue Street, terminating at the county line. The road continues east into Pine County as Brunswick Road (CR 5).

County Road 29 is a route servicing Kroschel Township. The route begins at its intersection with Velvet Street (CR 20), heads east on 340th Avenue for 1 mile (1.6 km) to the county line. The road continues into Pine County as Friesland Road (CR 26).

County Road 30 is a route servicing Kroschel Township. The route begins at its intersection with Velvet Street (CR 20), heads east and then north on 380th Avenue for 1.1 miles (1.8 km) to and along the county line. The road continues into Pine County as Groningen Road (CR 28).
