= Grass Lake =

Grass Lake may refer to:

== Canada ==
- Grass Lake (Haliburton County), Ontario
- Rural Municipality of Grass Lake No. 381, Saskatchewan

== United States ==
- Grass Lake, Illinois, a community and lake in Lake County
- Grass Lake School District 36, Lake County, Illinois
- Grass Lake, Michigan, a village in Jackson County
- Grass Lake Charter Township, Michigan, in Jackson County
- Grass Lake Community Schools, Jackson County, Michigan
- Grass Lake High School, a high school in Grass Lake, Michigan
- Grass Lake (Kanabec County, Minnesota)
- Grass Lake, Minnesota, a community in Kanabec County
- Grass Lake Township, Kanabec County, Minnesota
- Grass Lake (New York), a lake in Jefferson County
- Grass Lake (Codington County, South Dakota)
- Grass Lake (Minnehaha County, South Dakota)
- Grass Lake Nature Park, a lake and nature preserve in Olympia, Washington

== See also ==
- Grass Lake Township (disambiguation)
- Grassy Creek (disambiguation)
- Grassy Lake (disambiguation)
