= Minnesota State Highway 118 =

State highway in Minnesota, United States

Minnesota State Highway 118 was a highway route number in the U.S. state of Minnesota that was used previously during two different time periods: once during the 1930s and once during the 1990s.

The 1930s route was located in Isanti and Kanabec counties in east-central Minnesota. The 1990s route was located in the northern suburbs of the Twin Cities in south-central Anoka County and northwest Ramsey County.

== 1930s Highway 118 route ==
- MN 118 highlighted in red (1930s) and blue (1990s)

Route information
- Length: 18.25 mi (29.37 km)
- Existed: April 22, 1933–1943

Major junctions
- South end: MN 95 at Cambridge
- North end: MN 65 at Brunswick Township near Mora

Location
- Country: United States
- State: Minnesota
- Counties: Isanti, Kanabec

Highway system
- Minnesota Trunk Highway System; Interstate; US; State; Legislative; Scenic
← MN 117	→ MN 119

State Highway 118 was first used on a route that began at its intersection with State Highway 95 near the Rum River in the city of Cambridge and continued north to its northern terminus at its intersection with State Highway 65 in Brunswick Township, near the city of Mora.

=== Route description ===
Highway 118 originally served as a shortcut for then-U.S. Route 65, which followed what is now Minnesota State Highway 107 to Grasston, then turned west along what is now Minnesota State Highway 70.

The 1930s route of Highway 118 was 18 miles (29 km) in length and passed through the present-day communities of Cambridge Township, Springvale Township, Maple Ridge Township, Coin, Brunswick Township, and Brunswick.

Legally, the highway was defined as Route 189 in the Minnesota Statutes § 161.115(120). It was not marked with this number.

=== History ===
The route was authorized April 22, 1933. This 118 route mostly paralleled nearby Highway 65. When the shortcut on Highway 65 between Braham and Brunswick was constructed in 1941, 118 was rendered obsolete and it was removed in 1943. Today, this route is signed as Isanti County Road 14 and Kanabec County Road 16.

This was the first state highway decommissioned in Minnesota.

=== Major intersections ===
County	Location	mi	km	Destinations	Notes
Isanti	Cambridge	0.0	0.0	MN 95	Southern terminus
Isanti	Maple Ridge Township			CR 3	
Isanti	Maple Ridge Township			CR 4	
Kanabec	Brunswick Township			CR 4	
Kanabec	Brunswick Township	18.2	29.3	MN 65	Northern terminus
1.000 mi = 1.609 km; 1.000 km = 0.621 mi
