= Rice Creek =

Rice Creek might refer to:

== United States ==
=== Streams ===
- Rice Creek (Feather River), a North Fork Feather River tributary in California
- Rice Creek (St. Johns River), Florida
- Rice Creek (Elk River tributary), Minnesota
- Rice Creek (Mississippi River tributary), the Minneapolis-St. Paul metropolitan area, Minnesota
- Rice Creek (Snake River tributary), Minnesota
- Rice Creek (Missouri), a stream
- Rice Creek, Wisconsin, a stream - see Rice Creek State Natural Area

=== Other ===
- Rice Creek, Michigan, a community
- Rice Creek, a small Native American band of the Lower Sioux Dakota in the 1800s

== Canada ==
- Rice Creek (British Columbia), Canada, a stream
