= Arthur Township, Minnesota =

Arthur Township is the name of some places in the U.S. state of Minnesota:

- Arthur Township, Kanabec County, Minnesota
- Arthur Township, Traverse County, Minnesota

== See also ==
- Arthur Township (disambiguation)
