= Hillman Township, Minnesota =

Hillman Township is the name of two places in the U.S. state of Minnesota:

- Hillman Township, Kanabec County, Minnesota
- Hillman Township, Morrison County, Minnesota

== See also ==
- Hillman Township (disambiguation)
