= Pomroy =

Pomroy may refer to:

- David Pomroy (born 23 June 1983), professional poker player from London, England
- Shelly Pomroy, a fictional character in Veronica Mars (season 1)
- Pomroy Lake, a lake in Minnesota
- Pomroy Township, Minnesota (disambiguation):
  - Pomroy Township, Itasca County, Minnesota
  - Pomroy Township, Kanabec County, Minnesota
- Colonel Benjamin Pomroy, founder of Eastern Townships Bank
- Colin Pomroy, co-founder of Tempo Records (UK)
