= Kroschel, Minnesota =

Unincorporated community in Minnesota, United States

Kroschel
- Unincorporated community
- Location within Minnesota Location within the United States
- Coordinates: 46°04′18″N 93°04′34″W
- Country: United States
- State: Minnesota
- County: Kanabec
- Townships: Kroschel, Pomroy
- Elevation: 1,112 ft (339 m)
- Time zone: UTC-6 (Central (CST))
  - Summer (DST): UTC-5 (CDT)
- ZIP code: 55037
- Area code: 320
- GNIS feature ID: 646264

Kroschel is an unincorporated community in Kanabec County, Minnesota, United States.

The community is located at the junction of Kanabec County Road 5 (330th Avenue) and Kanabec County Road 20 (Velvet Street).

Kroschel is located within Kroschel Township and Pomroy Township. The South Fork of the Grindstone River flows through the community.

Nearby places include Hinckley, Brook Park, Sandstone, Friesland, Quamba, and Mora.

ZIP codes 55037 (Hinckley) and 55007 (Brook Park) meet near Kroschel. The boundary line between Kanabec and Pine counties is near Kroschel.
