= Dalbo, Minnesota =

Unincorporated community in Minnesota, United States

Dalbo
- Unincorporated community
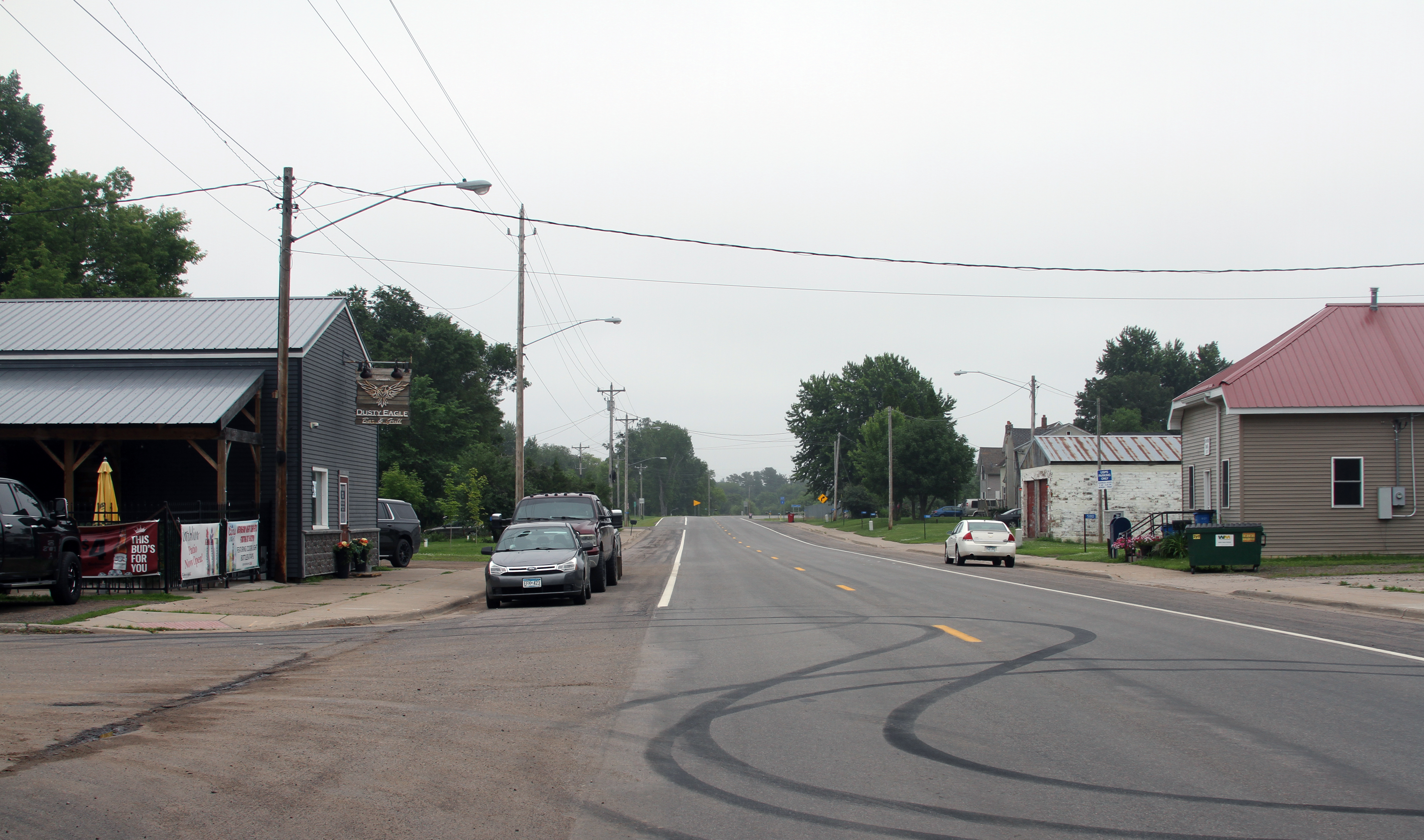
- Businesses on Minnesota State Highway 47

- Location within Minnesota Location within the United States
- Coordinates: 45°39′32″N 93°23′56″W
- Country: United States
- State: Minnesota
- County: Isanti
- Township: Dalbo Township
- Elevation: 965 ft (294 m)
- Time zone: UTC-6 (Central (CST))
  - Summer (DST): UTC-5 (CDT)
- Zip Code: 55017
- Area code: 763
- GNIS feature ID: 642601

Dalbo is an unincorporated community in Dalbo Township, Isanti County, Minnesota, United States.

Isanti County Roads 3, 13 and 57; and State Highway 47 (MN 47) are three of the main routes in the community. Nearby places include Cambridge, Pine Brook, Wyanett, Lewis Lake, Ogilvie, and Dalbo Wildlife Management Area. Stanchfield Creek flows through the community.

Dalbo is thought to be named in honor of immigrants from Dalarna, Sweden, it is more likely that Dalbo is named for the place of the same name in Dalsland, Sweden. Dalbo has definite immigrant ties to both Venjan and Älvdalen, in Dalarna.

== Infrastructure ==
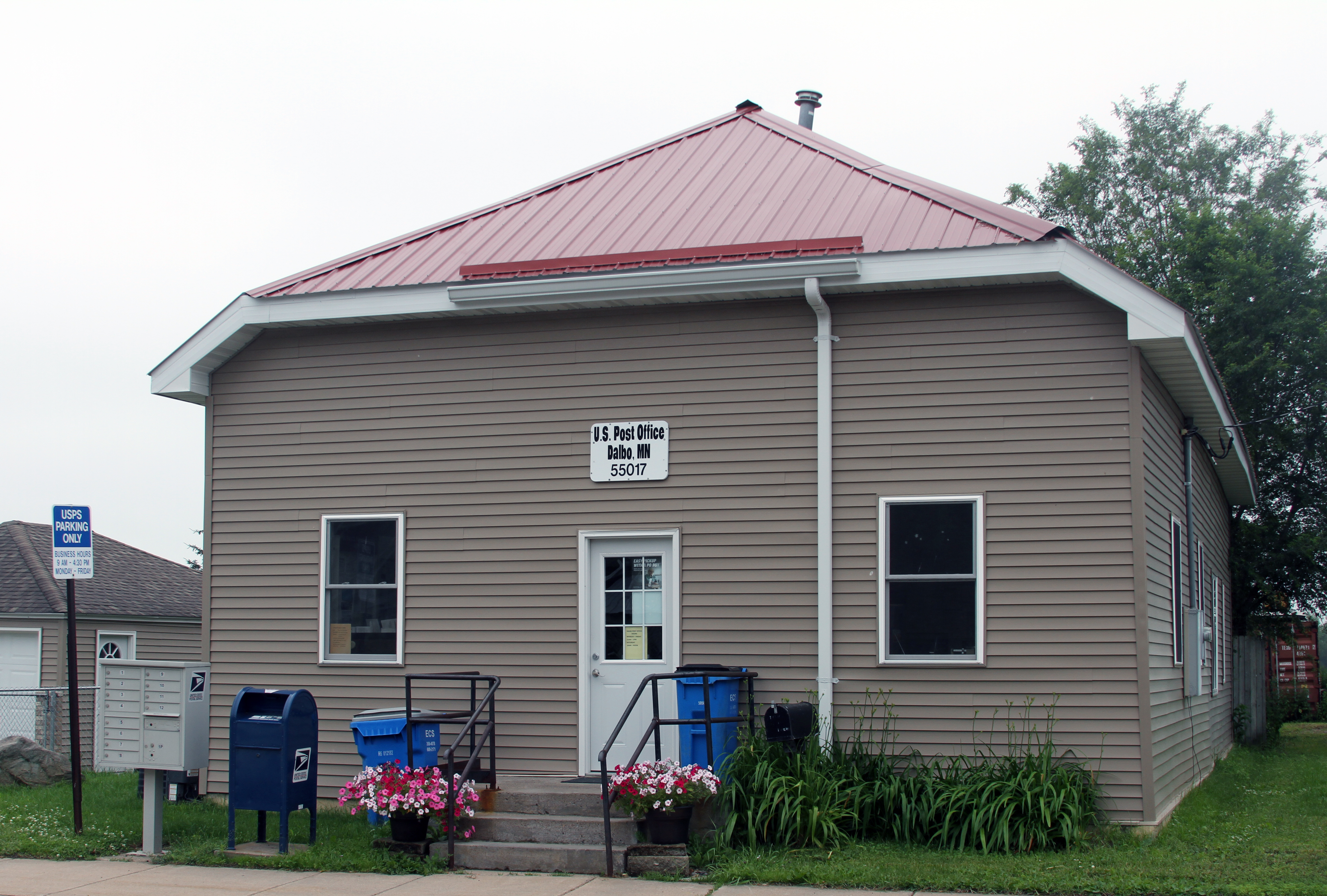
US Post Office, Dalbo, MN

=== Transportation ===
- Minnesota State Highway 47
- Isanti County Road 3
- Isanti County Road 13
- Isanti County Road 57
