= Arthur Township =

Arthur Township may refer to:

- Arthur Township, Michigan
- Arthur Township, Kanabec County, Minnesota
- Arthur Township, Traverse County, Minnesota
- Arthur Township, North Carolina in Pitt County, North Carolina
- Arthur Township, Cass County, North Dakota
