= Pine Brook =

Pine Brook may refer to:

- Pine Brook, Minnesota
- Pine Brook, Monmouth County, New Jersey
- Pine Brook, Morris County, New Jersey
- Pine Brook Hill, Colorado
- Pine Brook Country Club
- Pine Brook Covered Bridge
- Camp Pine Brook, an historic Adirondack Great Camp on Upper Saranac Lake
