= Carmody =

Carmody is a surname of Irish origin. The name refers to:

== Persons ==
- Alan Carmody (1920–1978), an Australian public servant
- Art Carmody (born 1984), an American college football kicker
- Bill Carmody (born 1951), an American college basketball coach
- David W. Carmody (1908–1976), Associate Justice of the New Mexico Supreme Court
- Don Carmody (contemporary), an American film producer
- Edmond Carmody (born 1934) Irish-born American bishop of the Roman Catholic Diocese of Corpus Christi
- Erin Carmody (born 1988), a Canadian (PEI) curler
- Isobelle Carmody (born 1958), an Australian author of science fiction, fantasy, and children's books
- John Carmody (judge) (1854–1920), Associate Justice of the North Dakota Supreme Court
- John M. Carmody (1881–1963), an American administrator
- Kev Carmody (born 1946), an Australian Indigenous singer-songwriter
- Martin H. Carmody (1872–1950), an American Supreme Knight of the Knights of Columbus
- Michael Carmody (contemporary), an Australian public servant; Commissioner of Taxation 1993–2005
- Robert Carmody (1938–1967), an American Olympic boxer
- Thomas Carmody (disambiguation)
- Tim Carmody (born 1956), an Australian judge

== Places ==
- Carmody Hills, Maryland, USA
- Carmody, Minnesota, USA
