= Pomroy Township, Minnesota =

Pomroy Township is the name of some places in the U.S. state of Minnesota:

- Pomroy Township, Itasca County, Minnesota
- Pomroy Township, Kanabec County, Minnesota

== See also ==
- Pomroy (disambiguation)
