= Hillman Township =

Hillman Township may refer to one of the following places in the United States:

- Hillman Township, Michigan
- Hillman Township, Kanabec County, Minnesota
- Hillman Township, Morrison County, Minnesota
