= Little Grassy Lake =

Little Grassy Lake may refer to:

- Little Grassy Lake (Illinois)
- Little Grassy Lake (Florida)
