= Carmody, Minnesota =

Unincorporated community in Minnesota, United States

Carmody
- Unincorporated community
- Location within Minnesota Location within the United States
- Coordinates: 45°39′06″N 93°28′17″W
- Country: United States
- State: Minnesota
- County: Isanti
- Township: Dalbo Township
- Elevation: 984 ft (300 m)
- Time zone: UTC-6 (Central (CST))
  - Summer (DST): UTC-5 (CDT)
- ZIP code: 55017 and 55371
- Area code: 763
- GNIS feature ID: 654630

Carmody is an unincorporated community in Dalbo Township, Isanti County, Minnesota, United States.

Isanti County Roads 13, 15, and 62 are three of the main routes in the community. Nearby places include Dalbo, Wyanett, and Princeton.

== Infrastructure ==
=== Transportation ===
- Isanti County Road 13
- Isanti County Road 15
- Isanti County Road 62
