= Lake Full of Fish =

Lake in the state of Minnesota, United States

- Location within Minnesota
- Location: Kanabec County, Minnesota
- Coordinates: 46°2′7″N 93°13′50″W
- Type: lake

Lake Full of Fish is a lake in Kanabec County, in the U.S. state of Minnesota.

Lake Full of Fish is the English translation of the native Ojibwe-language name.

== See also ==
- List of lakes in Minnesota
