= Isanti =

Isanti can refer to:

- Santee people, a subgroup of the Dakota people, a plains tribe

== Places ==
- Isanti County, Minnesota, United States
  - Isanti, Minnesota
  - Isanti Township, Isanti County, Minnesota

== Other ==
- Word for knife in the Dakota language
