= Kent Lake (Minnesota) =

Lake in the state of Minnesota, United States

- Location within Minnesota
- Location: Kanabec County, Minnesota
- Coordinates: 45°51′33″N 93°19′51″W
- Type: lake

Kent Lake is a lake in Kanabec County, in the U.S. state of Minnesota.

Kent Lake was named for Myron R. Kent, an early settler.

== See also ==
- List of lakes in Minnesota
