= Knife River (Snake River tributary) =

River in Minnesota, US

Coordinates: 45.9080136°N 93.2985574°W

The Knife River is a 27.4-mile-long (44.1 km) tributary of the Snake River in east-central Minnesota in the United States. It is one of three streams in Minnesota with this name. Its name is a translation from the Dakota Isaanti. Knife Lake and Santee Sioux are named after this river. In turn Isanti County is named after the Santee Sioux.

== Course ==
The Knife River with its tributaries drains a 102-square-mile (260 km^{2}) area of Mille Lacs and Kanabec counties. After initially flowing southeastward for 19 miles (31 km) from Ernest Pool near Wahkon, it flows to Knife Lake, then continues to flow southeastward for another 5 miles (8 km) to the Snake River, just north of Mora. At Mora, MN, the river has a mean annual discharge of 63 cubic feet per second.

== Associated lakes and tributaries ==
Only one lake is associated with the Knife River: Knife Lake. No major tributaries are associated with the Knife River. However, the river served as an important trade route for the Dakota, the Ojibwe, and the Voyageurs, connecting the Mississippi River (via Mille Lacs Lake) to the St. Croix River.

== See also ==
- List of rivers of Minnesota
