= Warman, Minnesota =

Unincorporated community in Minnesota, United States

Warman
- Unincorporated community
- Location within Minnesota Location within the United States
- Coordinates: 46°03′30″N 93°17′04″W
- Country: United States
- State: Minnesota
- County: Kanabec
- Township: Peace Township
- Elevation: 1,161 ft (354 m)
- Time zone: UTC-6 (Central (CST))
  - Summer (DST): UTC-5 (CDT)
- ZIP code: 55051
- Area code: 320
- GNIS feature ID: 653781

Warman is an unincorporated community in Peace Township, Kanabec County, Minnesota, United States.

The community is located north of Mora, near the junction of State Highway 65 (MN 65) and Kanabec County Roads 24 and 25.

Warman is located 13 miles north of Mora; and 14 miles east-southeast of Isle.

Snowshoe Brook flows through the community. Warman is located within ZIP code 55051, based in Mora.

== History ==
Warman, located in sections 5 and 6 of Peace Township, was named in honor of S. M. Warman, a granite quarry owner who was killed by the fall of a derrick. According to author and geologist Warren Upham, Warman opened a granite quarry in 1907, and on July 18 of that year, he and his wife, Sarah J. Warman, platted a community named Warman Creek on the west side of what now is State Highway 65, while N. C. Pike of Pike–Horning Granite Company, on July 23, 1907, platted a community on the east side of the roadway calling it East Mora. Eventually, these two small, competing communities merged to form the unincorporated community of Warman. A post office operated from 1907 until 1920.
