= Pine Brook, Minnesota =

Unincorporated community in Minnesota, United States

Pine Brook
- Unincorporated community
- Location within Minnesota Location within the United States
- Coordinates: 45°35′13″N 93°23′19″W
- Country: United States
- State: Minnesota
- County: Isanti
- Township: Wyanett Township and Springvale Township
- Elevation: 971 ft (296 m)
- Time zone: UTC-6 (Central (CST))
  - Summer (DST): UTC-5 (CDT)
- ZIP code: 55008
- Area code: 763
- GNIS feature ID: 654880

Pine Brook is an unincorporated community in Isanti County, Minnesota, United States.

The community is located between Cambridge and Princeton at the junction of State Highway 47 (MN 47) and State Highway 95 (MN 95).

Pine Brook is located within Wyanett Township and Springvale Township. Nearby places also include Bradford, Dalbo, and Springvale County Park. Pine Brook flows through the community.
