= Grassy Creek =

Grassy Creek may refer to:

== The Bahamas ==
- Little Grassy Creek

== Canada ==
- Rural Municipality of Grassy Creek No. 78, Saskatchewan

== United States ==
Populated places

- Grassy Creek, Kentucky, Morgan County
- Grassy Creek, Ashe County, North Carolina
- Grassy Creek Township, Ashe County, North Carolina

Streams

- Grassy Creek (Salt River), a stream in Missouri
- Grassy Creek (Deep River tributary), a stream in Moore County, North Carolina
- Grassy Creek (Rocky River tributary), a stream in Union County, North Carolina
- Grassy Creek (Elkin Creek tributary), a stream in Wilkes and Surry counties, North Carolina
- Grassy Creek (Texas), a stream in Johnson County, Texas
- Grassy Creek (Dan River tributary), a stream in Halifax County, Virginia

== See also ==
- Grassy Lake (disambiguation)
