= South Fork Township, Kanabec County, Minnesota =

South Fork Township, Minnesota
- Township
- Location within Minnesota and the United States South Fork Township (the United States)
- Coordinates: 45°47′3″N 93°27′18″W
- Country: United States
- State: Minnesota
- County: Kanabec

Area
  - Total: 36.4 sq mi (94.2 km^{2})
  - Land: 36.3 sq mi (94.1 km^{2})
  - Water: 0.039 sq mi (0.1 km^{2})
- Elevation: 1,004 ft (306 m)

Population (2000)
  - Total: 662
  - Density: 18/sq mi (7/km^{2})
- Time zone: UTC-6 (Central (CST))
  - Summer (DST): UTC-5 (CDT)
- FIPS code: 27-61348
- GNIS feature ID: 0665651

South Fork Township is a township in Kanabec County, Minnesota, United States. The population was 662 at the 2000 census.

South Fork Township was named for the south fork of the Groundhouse River.

== Geography ==
According to the United States Census Bureau, the township has a total area of 36.4 square miles (94.2 km^{2}), of which 36.3 square miles (94.1 km^{2}) is land and 0.04 square mile (0.1 km^{2}) (0.11%) is water.

== Demographics ==
As of the census of 2000, there were 662 people, 235 households, and 177 families residing in the township. The population density was 18.2 people per square mile (7.0/km^{2}). There were 246 housing units at an average density of 6.8/sq mi (2.6/km^{2}). The racial makeup of the township was 99.55% White, and 0.45% from two or more races. Hispanic or Latino of any race were 0.76% of the population.

There were 235 households, out of which 38.7% had children under the age of 18 living with them, 63.8% were married couples living together, 5.5% had a female householder with no husband present, and 24.3% were non-families. 17.4% of all households were made up of individuals, and 3.8% had someone living alone who was 65 years of age or older. The average household size was 2.82 and the average family size was 3.17.

In the township the population was spread out, with 29.9% under the age of 18, 8.0% from 18 to 24, 30.4% from 25 to 44, 23.4% from 45 to 64, and 8.3% who were 65 years of age or older. The median age was 36 years. For every 100 females, there were 111.5 males. For every 100 females age 18 and over, there were 109.0 males.

The median income for a household in the township was $45,268, and the median income for a family was $48,333. Males had a median income of $31,190 versus $20,078 for females. The per capita income for the township was $18,546. About 6.1% of families and 9.0% of the population were below the poverty line, including 10.7% of those under age 18 and 10.7% of those age 65 or over.
