= Coin, Minnesota =

Unincorporated community in Minnesota, United States

Coin
- Unincorporated community
- Location within Minnesota Location within the United States
- Coordinates: 45°44′06″N 93°18′24″W
- Country: United States
- State: Minnesota
- County: Kanabec
- Township: Brunswick Township
- Elevation: 971 ft (296 m)
- Time zone: UTC-6 (Central (CST))
  - Summer (DST): UTC-5 (CDT)
- ZIP code: 55006
- Area code: 320
- GNIS feature ID: 654649

Coin is an unincorporated community in Brunswick Township, Kanabec County, Minnesota, United States.

Kanabec County Road 4 (103rd Avenue) and Kanabec County Road 16 (King Road) are two of the main routes in the community. Nearby places include Braham, Mora, Brunswick, Lewis Lake, Stanchfield, and Cranberry Wildlife Management Area.

ZIP codes 55006 (Braham) and 55051 (Mora) meet near Coin.

Stanchfield Brook–Ties Creek flows through the community. State Highway 65 (MN 65) is nearby.

Coin is located in section 35 of Brunswick Township, which earlier had a post office from 1898 to 1904. The name Coin was suggested by Ole E. Olson, the storekeeper and postmaster, during the William Jennings Bryan debate of Free Silver in 1896.

The boundary line between Kanabec and Isanti counties is near Coin.
