= Grass Lake Township =

Grass Lake Township may refer to:

- Grass Lake Charter Township, Michigan
- Grass Lake Township, Kanabec County, Minnesota
- Grass Lake Township, North Dakota
