= Snake River (St. Croix River tributary) =

- The Snake River

- Mouth of the Snake River
- Native name: Ginebigo-ziibi (Ojibwe)

Location
- Country: United States
- State: Minnesota

Physical characteristics
- Mouth
  - coordinates: 45°49′31″N 92°45′58″W

The Snake River is a 104-mile-long (167 km) tributary of the St. Croix River in east-central Minnesota in the United States. It is one of three streams in Minnesota with this name. Its name is a translation from the Ojibwa Ginebigo-ziibi, after the Dakota peoples who made their homes along this river. Kanabec County's name is derived from the Ojibwe word for this river.

== Course ==
The Snake River with its tributaries drains a 1,009 square miles (2,610 km^{2}) area of Aitkin, Kanabec, Mille Lacs and Pine counties. After initially flowing southward from its headwaters in southern Aitkin County, the Snake flows through Kanabec County, turning eastward near Mora, Minnesota, following a minor fault line. It drains into the St. Croix River 13 miles (21 km) east of Pine City, Minnesota. At Pine City, the river measures approximately 650 cubic feet per second.

== Associated lakes and tributaries ==
Two nearby lakes are associated with the Snake River flowing through them: Cross Lake and Pokegama Lake. Cross Lake is a translation from the Ojibwa bimijigamaa, meaning "a lake that traverses (another body of water)", and is located 13 miles (21 km) from the river's mouth. Pokegama Lake, located 17.5 miles (28.2 km) from the river's mouth, gets its name from the Ojibwa bakegamaa, meaning "a side-lake (of another body of water)" whereby the lake has an outlet on the Snake and by receiving water from Pokegama Creek from the north, thereby having a current through it. Major tributaries of the Snake River are the Knife River, Ann River, Groundhouse River, and Rice Creek.

== Culture ==
The Snake and the Knife rivers served as the main waterway to connect the St. Croix River with Mille Lacs Lake. As recorded by Henry Schoolcraft, Chief Kappamappa made his home at Chengwatana at the mouth of the Snake. A stream near the outlet of Pokegama Lake is called Mission Creek, for the Protestant American Board of Commissioners for Foreign Missions station on the east side of Pokegama Lake of the American Board of Commissioners for Foreign Missions in the village of Biajek and Nodin which faced the island in 1836–46. The mission was founded by Frederic and Elisabeth Ayer with help from John Seymour and native Henry Blatchford. In time it ran a school, had a church congregation, and taught agricultural skills appropriate for plow farming. Translators helped both the Ojibwe parents and children and the teachers learn one another's language with schoolbooks and portions of the Bible in Ojibwe Ojibwe language. The books were developed in Minnesota and Wisconsin and printed in the East but a later misconception confused them with books printed in the 1850s by a press donated to American Missionary Association's Alonzo Barnard which was used in mission work with Ojibwe after the 1840s.

After the 1837 treaty a blacksmith and "Indian farmer" were located at the south end of Pokegama lake who, with the farmer and blacksmith at Chippewa Falls served the central Minnesota-Central Wisconsin bands. After the attack by Dakota warriors at Pokegama in 1841, the mission was thinly attended, many of the participants having sought safety with the Mille Lacs or La Pointe bands and the financial backing ended in 1846. By that time liquor had inundated the locality via the logging camps on the St. Croix. The Snake River and the lake were some of the earliest sites of Minnesota commercial, non-military logging. In the later nineteenth century the lake became a resort for the wealthy.

During an earlier period, this river was inhabited by the Biitan-akiing-enabijig ("Border-sitters") who were both Ojibwa and Dakota. The Biitan-akiing-enabijig had numerous internal skirmishes as they defined themselves as either Ojibwa or Dakota, giving a false perspective that the Mdewakanton Dakota Sioux and Ojibwa Nations were at constant war. Eventually, the Biitan-akiing-enabijig who defined themselves as Ojibwa became part of the St. Croix Band of Lake Superior Chippewa, and the Snake River sub-band(s) subsequently became part of the St. Croix Chippewa Indians of Minnesota, one of the four constituent tribes of the Mille Lacs Band of Ojibwe.

The North West Company fur trade post was established on the river in 1804, near present Pine City. The post was used for several years, then abandoned and destroyed in a fire. The site was later rediscovered and excavated. The rowhouse and palisade fence were reconstructed and opened up as a living history museum in 1970.

Together with Cross Lake and the Knife River, the 1757 edition of the Mitchell Map identifies this river system as "Portage River" as it served as the waterway that connected the St. Croix River with Mille Lacs Lake and the upper Mississippi River, via a short portage.

== See also ==
- List of rivers of Minnesota
- Minnesota Department of Natural Resources
