= Grassy Lake =

Grassy Lake may refer to:

- Grassy Lake, Alberta, a hamlet in Canada
- Grassy Lake in Faulkner County, Arkansas
- Grassy Lake Dam, a small dam in Wyoming
- Grassy Lake (Florida), a lake in Highlands County, Florida
- Grassy Lake Preserve, a protected area in Florida
- Grassy Lake (Louisiana), a lake in St. Martin and Assumption Parishes
- Little Grassy Lake (Florida), a lake in Highlands County, Florida
- Little Grassy Lake (Illinois), a reservoir in southern Illinois

== See also ==
- Grasset Lake, Quebec, Canada
