= Brunswick, Minnesota =

Unincorporated community in Minnesota, United States

Brunswick
- Unincorporated community
- Location within Minnesota Location within the United States
- Coordinates: 45°47′20″N 93°16′33″W
- Country: United States
- State: Minnesota
- County: Kanabec
- Township: Brunswick Township
- Elevation: 961 ft (293 m)
- Time zone: UTC-6 (Central (CST))
  - Summer (DST): UTC-5 (CDT)
- ZIP code: 55051
- Area code: 320
- GNIS feature ID: 640556

Brunswick is an unincorporated community in Brunswick Township, Kanabec County, Minnesota, United States. The community is located between Mora and Rock Creek at the junction of State Highway 65 (MN 65) and State Highway 70 (MN 70).

The Groundhouse River flows through the community. Nearby places include Mora, Braham, Coin, Stanchfield, and Grasston.

ZIP codes 55051 (Mora) and 55006 (Braham) meet near Brunswick.

Historical population
Census	Pop.	Note	%±
1860	30		—
1870	93		210.0%
U.S. Decennial Census

== History ==
Brunswick, platted in 1856, is situated within Brunswick Township. The community is located in Section 1 of the township, but its history traces back to the Hersey, Staples, and Bean Lumber Company, whose logging headquarters were in Section 12 of the township. George and Isaac Staples platted the site of the community, naming it after Brunswick, Maine. With stores, a post office, and mills located in Brunswick, it became the county seat for Kanabec County on March 13, 1859. It retained its status as the county seat until it was transferred to Mora in 1883.

A post office was established at Brunswick in 1860, and remained in operation until 1934.
