= Rice Creek (British Columbia) =

Coordinates: 49°03′56″N 119°09′18″W

Rice Creek is a creek located in the Boundary Country region of British Columbia. The creek flows into McKinney Creek from the east. This creek has been mined for gold.
