= Grass Lake, Minnesota =

Unincorporated community in Minnesota, United States

Grass Lake
- Unincorporated community
- Location within Minnesota Location within the United States
- Coordinates: 45°46′41″N 93°10′04″W
- Country: United States
- State: Minnesota
- County: Kanabec
- Township: Grass Lake
- Elevation: 971 ft (296 m)
- Time zone: UTC-6 (Central (CST))
  - Summer (DST): UTC-5 (CDT)
- Area code: 320
- GNIS feature ID: 654733

Grass Lake is an unincorporated community in Grass Lake Township, Kanabec County, Minnesota, United States.
