= Comfort Township, Kanabec County, Minnesota =

Comfort Township, Minnesota
- Township
- Location within Minnesota and the United States Comfort Township (the United States)
- Coordinates: 45°51′26″N 93°12′37″W
- Country: United States
- State: Minnesota
- County: Kanabec

Area
  - Total: 36.0 sq mi (93.2 km^{2})
  - Land: 35.5 sq mi (92.0 km^{2})
  - Water: 0.50 sq mi (1.3 km^{2})
- Elevation: 1,010 ft (308 m)

Population (2000)
  - Total: 931
  - Density: 26/sq mi (10.1/km^{2})
- Time zone: UTC-6 (Central (CST))
  - Summer (DST): UTC-5 (CDT)
- FIPS code: 27-12754
- GNIS feature ID: 0663855
- Website: https://www.comforttownship.com/

Comfort Township is a township in Kanabec County, Minnesota, United States. The population was 931 at the 2000 census.

Comfort Township was named for an early settler. In 1926 a historic Golf Course was built and is maintained to prestine condition still to the present date.

== Geography ==
According to the United States Census Bureau, the township has a total area of 36.0 square miles (93 km^{2}), of which 35.5 square miles (92 km^{2}) is land and 0.5 square miles (1.3 km^{2}) (1.36%) is water.

== Demographics ==
As of the census of 2000, there were 931 people, 344 households, and 269 families residing in the township. The population density was 26.2 inhabitants per square mile (10.1/km^{2}). There were 403 housing units at an average density of 11.3 per square mile (4.4/km^{2}). The racial makeup of the township was 99.25% White, 0.21% Native American, 0.11% Asian, 0.11% from other races, and 0.32% from two or more races. Hispanic or Latino of any race were 0.97% of the population.

There were 344 households, out of which 39.2% had children under the age of 18 living with them, 68.0% were married couples living together, 5.5% had a female householder with no husband present, and 21.8% were non-families. 18.0% of all households were made up of individuals, and 5.5% had someone living alone who was 65 years of age or older. The average household size was 2.71 and the average family size was 3.05.

In the township the population was spread out, with 38.7% under the age of 18, 28.3% from 18 to 24, 28.7% from 25 to 44, 4.0% from 45 to 64, and 0.3% who were 65 years of age or older. The median age was 27 years. For every 100 females, there were 79.7 males. For every 100 females age 18 and over, there were 68.1 males.

The median income for a household in the township was $36,750, and the median income for a family was $42,917. Males had a median income of $30,625 versus $26,477 for females. The per capita income for the township was $20,268. About 6.8% of families and 10.6% of the population were below the poverty line, including 16.1% of those under age 18 and 7.0% of those age 65 or over.
