= Rice Creek (Missouri) =

Stream in the U.S. state of Missouri

Rice Creek is a stream in Daviess and DeKalb Counties in the U.S. state of Missouri. It is a tributary of Grindstone Creek.

The stream headwaters arise in southwestern Daviess County just west of US Route 69 and approximately one mile north of the community of Mabel at 39°50′10″N 94°11′39″W. The stream flows northwest into Dekalb County to its confluence approximately three miles from its source. The confluence is approximately three miles south of Weatherby. The confluence is at 39°52′00″N 94°14′43″W.

Rice Creek was named after William Rice, a pioneer citizen.

== See also ==
- List of rivers of Missouri
