= Quamba, Minnesota =

City in Minnesota, United States

- City
- Location of Quamba, Minnesota
- Coordinates: 45°54′56″N 93°10′31″W
- Country: United States
- State: Minnesota
- County: Kanabec
- Established: 1882
- Platted: 1901
- Incorporated: July 11, 1952

Government
  - Mayor: Terri Sanford

Area
  - Total: 0.703 sq mi (1.822 km^{2})
  - Land: 0.703 sq mi (1.822 km^{2})
  - Water: 0 sq mi (0.000 km^{2})
- Elevation: 1,020 ft (310 m)

Population (2020)
  - Total: 107
  - Estimate (2022): 108
  - Density: 152.1/sq mi (58.72/km^{2})
- Time zone: UTC−6 (Central (CST))
  - Summer (DST): UTC−5 (CDT)
- ZIP Code: 55007
- Area code: 320
- FIPS code: 27-52756
- GNIS feature ID: 2396296
- Sales tax: 7.375%

Quamba (/ˈkwɑːmbə/ KWAHM-bə) is a city in Kanabec County, Minnesota, United States. The population was 107 at the 2020 census. It is the only city in Minnesota that begins with the letter Q.

== History ==
Quamba was first established in 1882 on the side track of the Great Northern Railway. Originally, the community was called "Mud Creek" after the creek that flows through the community and that the railroad tracks crossed; the Ojibwe population in the area, though, called the creek Basa'igani-ziibiwishenh ("Creek to square Cedar Timbers"), thus calling the community Basa'igani-ziibiwishenying ("By the Creek to Square Cedar Timbers"). When the depot was built, the name was changed to "Quamba," which according to the railway officials was derived from an Indian word for "mudhole"; most likely the name derives from the Ottawa word: zhashkwiimbaakmigaa (fully vocalized as azhashki-wiimbaakamigaa: "be a muddy hole in the ground"). The community was platted in 1901 by Oric Ogilvie Whited and incorporated as a village on July 11, 1952. Its post office operated 1901–1903 and 1906–1966.

== Geography ==
According to the United States Census Bureau, the city has a total area of 0.704 square miles (1.82 km^{2}), all land.

== Transportation ==
=== Major routes ===
The following roads serve as primary routes through Quamba.

- Minnesota State Highway 23
- Kanabec County Road 5
- Kanabec County Road 70

== Demographics ==
Historical population
Census	Pop.	Note	%±
1960	95		—
1970	114		20.0%
1980	122		7.0%
1990	124		1.6%
2000	98		−21.0%
2010	123		25.5%
2020	107		−13.0%
2022 (est.)	108		0.9%
U.S. Decennial Census; 2020 Census

=== 2010 census ===
As of the 2010 census, there were 123 people, 42 households, and 30 families residing in the city. The population density was 170.8 inhabitants per square mile (65.9/km^{2}). There were 47 housing units at an average density of 65.3 per square mile (25.2/km^{2}). The racial makeup of the city was 99.2% White and 0.8% Native American. Hispanic or Latino of any race were 2.4% of the population.

There were 42 households, of which 31.0% had children under the age of 18 living with them, 54.8% were married couples living together, 11.9% had a female householder with no husband present, 4.8% had a male householder with no wife present, and 28.6% were non-families. 16.7% of all households were made up of individuals, and 9.5% had someone living alone who was 65 years of age or older. The average household size was 2.93 and the average family size was 3.23.

The median age in the city was 35.5 years. 26.8% of residents were under the age of 18; 12.4% were between the ages of 18 and 24; 17.2% were from 25 to 44; 30.1% were from 45 to 64; and 13.8% were 65 years of age or older. The gender makeup of the city was 43.1% male and 56.9% female.

=== 2000 census ===
As of the 2000 census, there were 98 people, 33 households, and 26 families residing in the city. The population density was 133.6 inhabitants per square mile (51.6/km^{2}). There were 38 housing units at an average density of 51.8 per square mile (20.0/km^{2}). The racial makeup of the city was 97.96% White, and 2.04% from two or more races.

There were 33 households, out of which 33.3% had children under the age of 18 living with them, 51.5% were married couples living together, 15.2% had a female householder with no husband present, and 21.2% were non-families. 18.2% of all households were made up of individuals, and 6.1% had someone living alone who was 65 years of age or older. The average household size was 2.97 and the average family size was 3.31.

In the city, the population was spread out, with 34.7% under the age of 18, 6.1% from 18 to 24, 29.6% from 25 to 44, 19.4% from 45 to 64, and 10.2% who were 65 years of age or older. The median age was 31 years. For every 100 females, there were 81.5 males. For every 100 females age 18 and over, there were 93.9 males.

The median income for a household in the city was $38,125, and the median income for a family was $32,188. Males had a median income of $47,813 versus $28,000 for females. The per capita income for the city was $15,923. There were 8.0% of families and 7.4% of the population living below the poverty line, including no under eighteens and none of those over 64.
