= Grassy Lake (Florida) =

Lake in the state of Florida, United States

- Location within Florida Location within the United States
- Location: south of Lake Placid, Florida
- Coordinates: 27°15′18″N 81°20′03″W
- Lake type: natural freshwater lake
- Basin countries: United States
- Max. length: 2.23 miles (3.59 km)
- Max. width: 0.72 miles (1.16 km)
- Surface area: 529.91 acres (214 ha)
- Average depth: 11 feet (3.4 m)
- Max. depth: 23 feet (7.0 m)
- Surface elevation: 90 feet (27 m)
- Islands: numerous islands and islets at south end of lake; two islands are wooded

Grassy lake, also sometimes called Lake Grassy, is a long, narrow lake south of the city of Lake Placid, Florida. It has a surface area of 529.91-acre (2,144,500 m^{2}). This lake's shore is 90% surrounded by development, mainly single-family housing. A small section of the southwest shore is bordered by U.S. Route 27.

Grassy Lake only has public access along the public right of way along US 27. There are no public boat ramps or no public swimming areas. No information is available about the types of fish in this lake.
