= Grass Lake School District 36 =

School district in Illinois, United States

Coordinates: 42.4389°N 88.1393°W

Address
- 26177 West Grass Lake Road Antioch, Illinois, 60002; United States

District information
- Grades: K-8
- Superintendent: Dr. William Newby

Other information
- Website: Official website

Grass Lake School District 36 is a K-8 school district located in the southern reaches of the village of Antioch, which is in turn located in Lake County, the northeasternmost county in the state of Illinois. The superintendent of the school district is Dr. William Newby; because Grass Lake School District 36 only has one school. Principal Wollberg serves as the principal of his district's only school. That school, which, as stated previously, is the only one that exists in District 36, is called Grass Lake School; it serves kindergarteners to eighth graders. The mascot is the brave, a historical nickname for the Native American.

Grass Lake School was originally a one-room schoolhouse that served Lake County in the late 19th century; instead of closing, like so many of its counterparts, the main building was built up soon after the end of World War II came about; additions to the schoolhouse in the 1970s' allowed the new district to give rise to a full-fledged grade school. In the year 2000, more renovation expanded the school, and the old belfry that had served the school in past years was preserved in the school foyer.

The school sports a cheerleading squad, a soccer team, a volleyball team, and a basketball team.
