= Rice Creek (Elk River tributary) =

Stream in Sherburne County, Minnesota, U.S.

Coordinates: 45°28′58″N 93°58′30″W

Rice Creek is a stream in Sherburne County, in the U.S. state of Minnesota. It is a tributary of the Elk River.

Rice Creek was named for the wild rice along its course.

== See also ==
- List of rivers of Minnesota
