= Grass Lake, Illinois =

- Unincorporated community
- Location within Illinois Location within the United States
- Coordinates: 42°26′46″N 88°08′09″W
- Country: United States
- State: Illinois
- County: Lake
- Township: Antioch
- Elevation: 768 ft (234 m)
- Time zone: UTC-6 (Central (CST))
  - Summer (DST): UTC-5 (CDT)
- Area codes: 847 & 224
- GNIS feature ID: 1821972

Grass Lake is an unincorporated community in Antioch Township, Lake County, Illinois, United States. Grass Lake is on County Route A10, 3 miles (4.8 km) southwest of Antioch.
