= Ann Lake Township, Kanabec County, Minnesota =

Ann Lake Township, Minnesota
- Township
- Location within Minnesota and the United States Ann Lake Township (the United States)
- Coordinates: 45°55′53″N 93°25′41″W
- Country: United States
- State: Minnesota
- County: Kanabec

Area
  - Total: 32.4 sq mi (84.0 km^{2})
  - Land: 31.6 sq mi (81.8 km^{2})
  - Water: 0.85 sq mi (2.2 km^{2})
- Elevation: 1,122 ft (342 m)

Population (2000)
  - Total: 377
  - Density: 12/sq mi (4.6/km^{2})
- Time zone: UTC-6 (Central (CST))
  - Summer (DST): UTC-5 (CDT)
- FIPS code: 27-01702
- GNIS feature ID: 0663439

Ann Lake Township is a township in Kanabec County, Minnesota, United States. The population was 377 at the 2000 census.

Ann was the name of a local Ojibwe Indian woman.

== Geography ==
According to the United States Census Bureau, the township has a total area of 32.4 square miles (84 km^{2}), of which 31.6 square miles (82 km^{2}) is land and 0.9 square miles (2.3 km^{2}) (2.62%) is water.

== Demographics ==
=== Census ===
As of the census of 2000, there were 377 people, 147 households, and 107 families residing in the township. The population density was 11.9 inhabitants per square mile (4.6/km^{2}). There were 187 housing units at an average density of 5.9 per square mile (2.3/km^{2}). The racial makeup of the township was 97.35% White, 0.27% African American, 0.27% Native American, 0.80% Asian, and 1.33% from two or more races. Hispanic or Latino people of any race were 0.27% of the population.

=== Households ===
There were 147 households, out of which 29.9% had children under the age of 18 living with them, 55.1% were married couples living together, 9.5% had a female householder with no husband present, and 27.2% were non-families. 23.8% of all households were made up of individuals, and 11.6% had someone living alone who was 65 years of age or older. The average household size was 2.56 and the average family size was 2.90.

=== Population by Age ===
In the township the population was spread out, with 26.5% under the age of 18, 6.1% from 18 to 24, 27.3% from 25 to 44, 27.1% from 45 to 64, and 13.0% who were 65 years of age or older. The median age was 38 years. For every 100 females, there were 123.1 males. For every 100 females age 18 and over, there were 118.1 males.

=== Income ===
The median income for a household in the township was $45,313, and the median income for a family was $51,607. Males had a median income of $34,583 versus $24,375 for females. The per capita income for the township was $18,318. About 3.4% of families and 8.4% of the population were below the poverty line, including 11.2% of those under age 18 and 8.0% of those age 65 or over.
