= Kanabec Township, Kanabec County, Minnesota =

Kanabec Township, Minnesota
- Township
- Location within Minnesota and the United States Kanabec Township (the United States)
- Coordinates: 45°51′30″N 93°27′22″W
- Country: United States
- State: Minnesota
- County: Kanabec

Area
  - Total: 36.3 sq mi (94.1 km^{2})
  - Land: 35.9 sq mi (93.1 km^{2})
  - Water: 0.35 sq mi (0.9 km^{2})
- Elevation: 1,070 ft (326 m)

Population (2000)
  - Total: 853
  - Density: 24/sq mi (9.2/km^{2})
- Time zone: UTC-6 (Central (CST))
  - Summer (DST): UTC-5 (CDT)
- FIPS code: 27-32300
- GNIS feature ID: 0664594

Kanabec Township (/kəˈneɪbɪk/ kə-NAY-bik) is a township in Kanabec County, Minnesota, United States. The population was 853 at the 2000 census.

== Geography ==
According to the United States Census Bureau, the township has a total area of 36.3 square miles (94 km^{2}), of which 36.0 square miles (93 km^{2}) is land and 0.4 square miles (1.0 km^{2}) (0.99%) is water.

== Demographics ==
As of the census of 2000, there were 854 people, 303 households, and 233 families residing in the township. The population density was 23.7 inhabitants per square mile (9.2/km^{2}). There were 345 housing units at an average density of 9.6 per square mile (3.7/km^{2}). The racial makeup of the township was 98.48% White, 0.35% Native American, 0.59% Asian, and 0.59% from two or more races. 0.70% of the population are Hispanic or Latino of any race.

There were 303 households, out of which 40.3% had children under the age of 18 living with them, 62.0% were married couples living together, 8.6% had a female householder with no husband present, and 23.1% were non-families. 20.8% of all households were made up of individuals, and 5.3% had someone living alone who was 65 years of age or older. The average household size was 2.82 and the average family size was 3.18.

In the township the population was spread out, with 29.8% under the age of 18, 7.2% from 18 to 24, 29.7% from 25 to 44, 23.7% from 45 to 64, and 9.7% who were 65 years of age or older. The median age was 35 years. For every 100 females, there were 105.5 males. For every 100 females age 18 and over, there were 108.0 males.

The median income for a household in the township was $40,200, and the median income for a family was $41,917. Males had a median income of $28,750 versus $18,083 for females. The per capita income for the township was $16,711. About 12.0% of families and 16.8% of the population were below the poverty line, including 26.7% of those under the age of 18 and 18.6% of those 65 and older.
