= Rice Creek State Natural Area =

State Natural Area in Vilas County, Wisconsin, United States

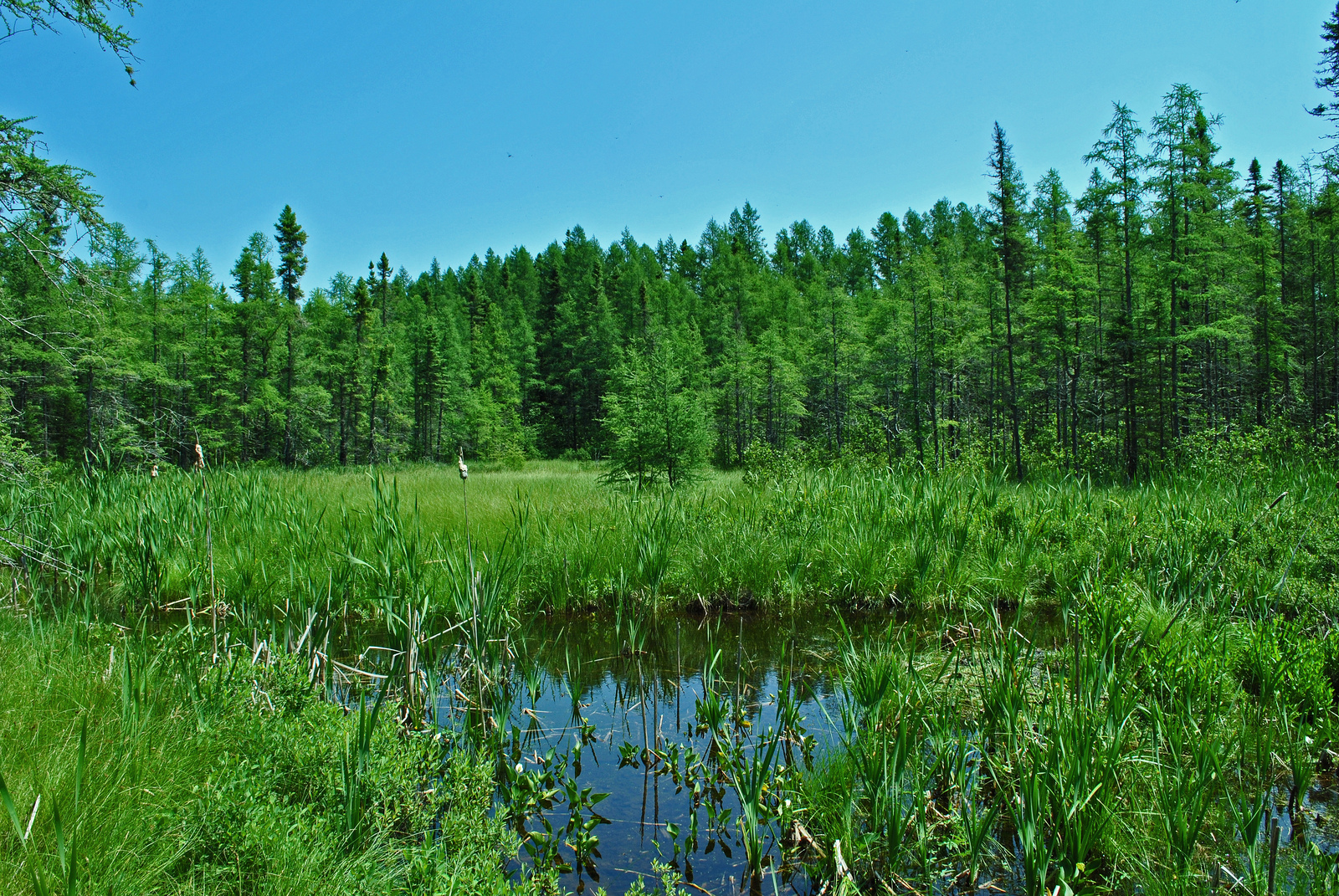

- Location within Wisconsin Location within the United States
- Location: Vilas County, Wisconsin
- Coordinates: 46°9′53″N 89°44′53″W
- Area: 435 acres (176 ha)
- Established: 2007
- Owner: Wisconsin Department of Natural Resources
- Website: Official website
- Wisconsin State Natural Areas

Rice Creek is a Wisconsin Department of Natural Resources-designated State Natural Area that features a large, high-quality wetland complex of conifer swamps, fens, and sedge meadows along a two-mile stretch of Rice Creek. The creek contains dense, lush beds of emergent and submergent aquatic vegetation, including wild rice. White cedar, balsam fir, black spruce, and tamarack are the dominant trees in the conifer swamp. Several stands of old-growth hemlock/hardwood forest can be found in the site, each with a supercanopy of large white pine. Two fens, fed by groundwater seepages and of exceptional floristic diversity, are found near the creek. Overall, the site supports a high concentration of rare plants and animals. At least seven species of orchid are found here: showy lady slipper, heart-leaf twayblade, swamp pink, striped coralroot, blunt-leaf orchid, northern bog orchid, and boreal bog orchid (Platanthera dilatata). Other notable plant species include: bog arrowgrass, naked miterwort, marsh cinquefoil, purple clematis, and downy willowherb (Epilobium strictum). Notable animal species present include: barred owl, Canada jay, pine siskin, winter wren, and bog copper.

== Location and access ==
Rice Creek is located in northwest Vilas County, within the Northern Highland-American Legion State Forest, approximately 5 miles (8.0 km) south of Presque Isle and 6 miles (9.7 km) northwest of Boulder Junction. The site is best accessed via canoe, with a canoe landing located at Round Lake, at the end of Round Lake Rd.

== Gallery ==
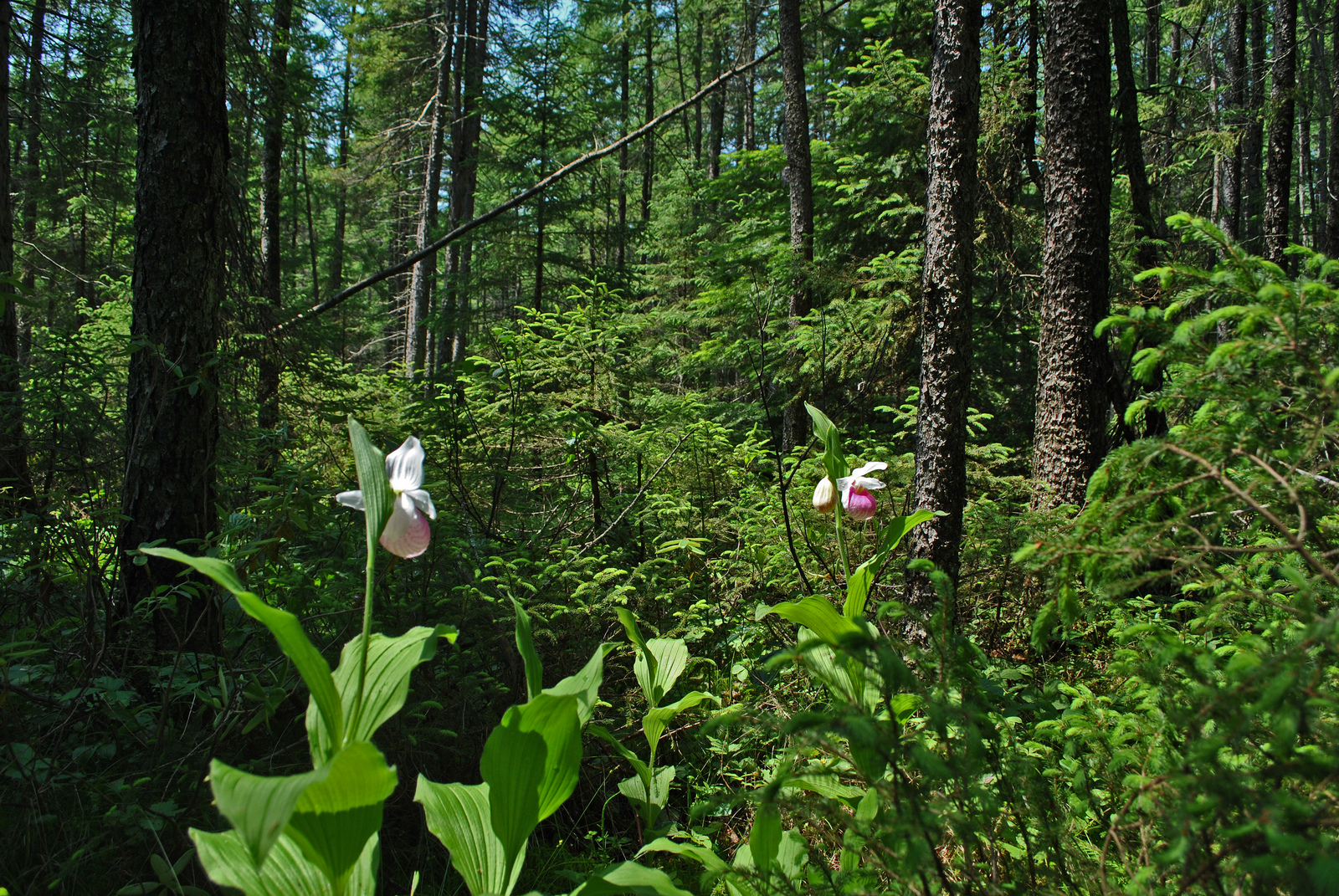
Showy ladyslippers photographed at Rice Creek State Natural Area

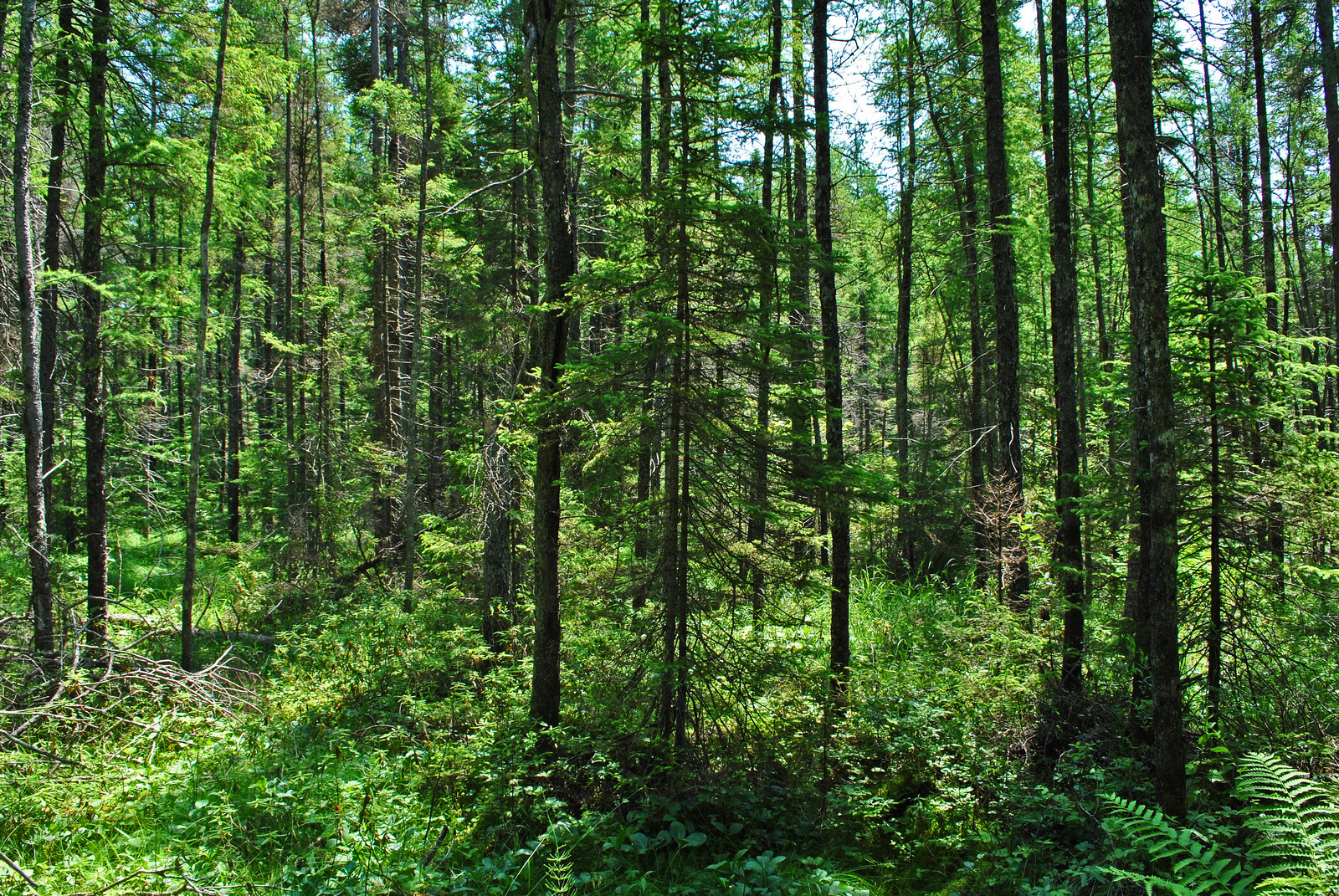
Conifer swamp at Rice Creek

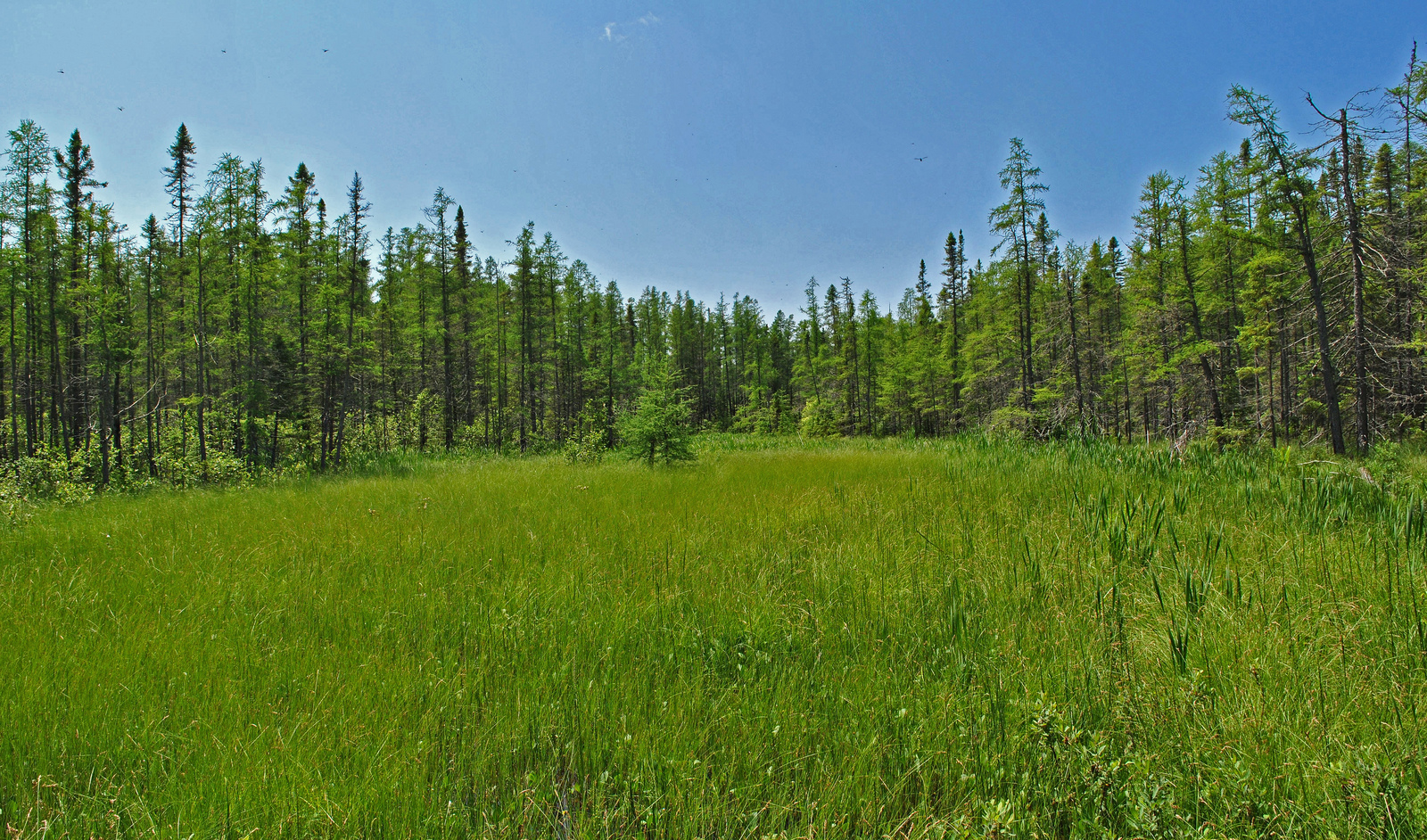
Boreal rich fen located in the natural area

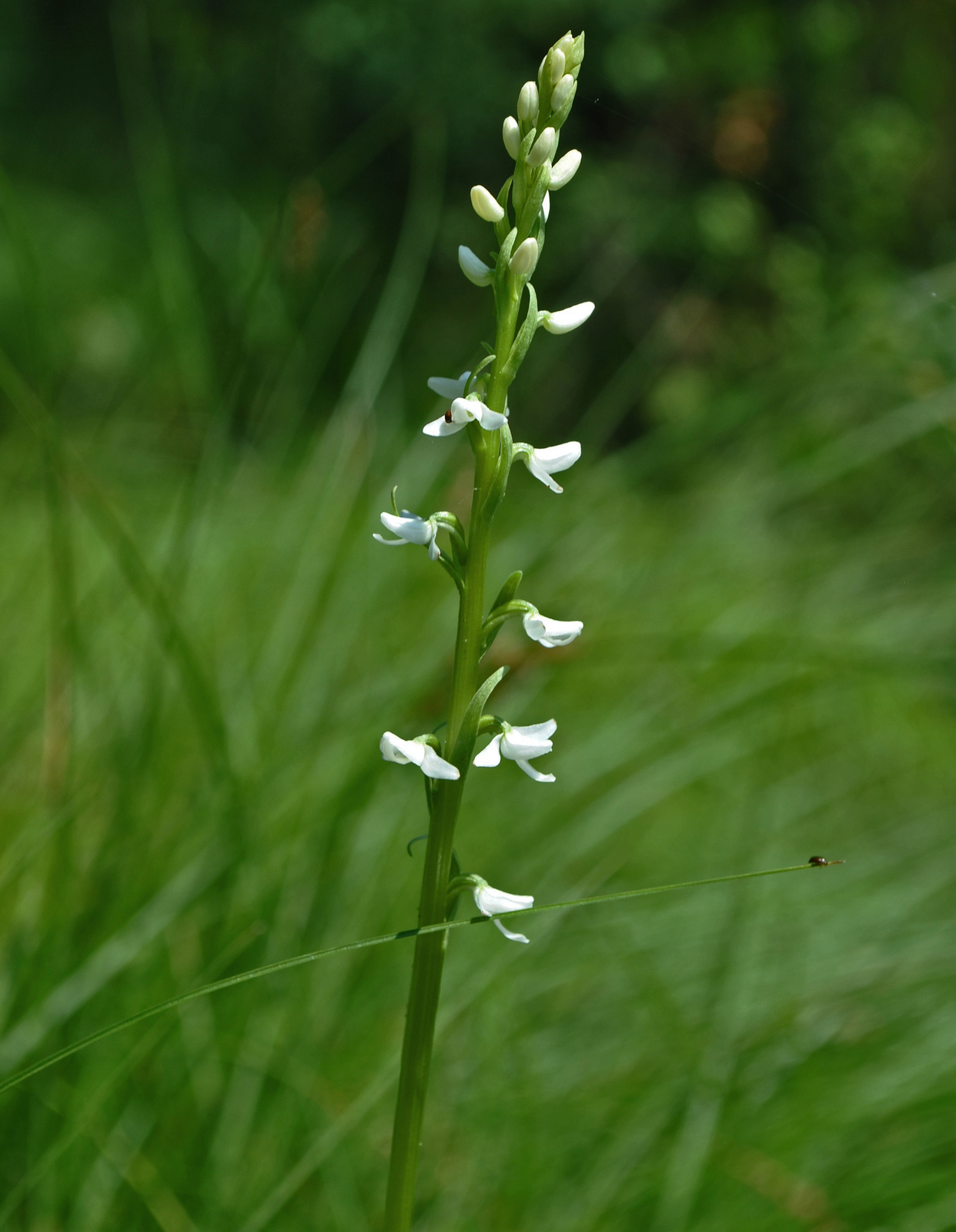
Platanthera dilatata photographed in the boreal rich fen
