= Whited Township, Kanabec County, Minnesota =

Whited Township, Minnesota
- Township
- Location within Minnesota and the United States Whited Township (the United States)
- Coordinates: 45°56′19″N 93°11′41″W
- Country: United States
- State: Minnesota
- County: Kanabec

Area
  - Total: 30.7 sq mi (79.4 km^{2})
  - Land: 30.5 sq mi (78.9 km^{2})
  - Water: 0.15 sq mi (0.4 km^{2})
- Elevation: 1,053 ft (321 m)

Population (2000)
  - Total: 808
  - Density: 26/sq mi (10.2/km^{2})
- Time zone: UTC-6 (Central (CST))
  - Summer (DST): UTC-5 (CDT)
- ZIP code: 55051
- FIPS code: 27-69988
- GNIS feature ID: 0665984

Whited Township is a township in Kanabec County, Minnesota, United States. The population was 808 at the 2000 census.

Whited Township was named for Oric Ogilvie Whited, an early landowner.

== Geography ==
According to the United States Census Bureau, the township has a total area of 30.6 square miles (79.4 km^{2}), of which 30.5 square miles (78.9 km^{2}) is land and 0.2 square mile (0.4 km^{2}) (0.55%) is water.

== Demographics ==
As of the census of 2000, there were 808 people, 300 households, and 233 families residing in the township. The population density was 26.5 inhabitants per square mile (10.2/km^{2}). There were 363 housing units at an average density of 11.9/sq mi (4.6/km^{2}). The racial makeup of the township was 97.90% White, none Black or African American, 0.99% Native American, 0.12% Asian, none are Pacific Islander or from other races, and 0.99% are from two or more races. Hispanic or Latino of any race were 0.62% of the population.

There were 300 households, out of which 37.7% had children under the age of 18 living with them, 64.7% were married couples living together, 8.0% had a female householder with no husband present, and 22.3% were non-families. 19.7% of all households were made up of individuals, and 4.7% had someone living alone who was 65 years of age or older. The average household size was 2.69 and the average family size was 3.02.

In the township the population was spread out, with 28.1% under the age of 18, 6.1% from 18 to 24, 29.3% from 25 to 44, 27.4% from 45 to 64, and 9.2% who were 65 years of age or older. The median age was 38 years. For every 100 females, there were 103.0 males. For every 100 females age 18 and over, there were 113.6 males.

The median income for a household in the township was $42,708, and the median income for a family was $43,594. Males had a median income of $35,156 versus $22,891 for females. The per capita income for the township was $17,129. About 4.8% of families and 6.9% of the population were below the poverty line, including 5.7% of those under age 18 and 5.1% of those age 65 or over.
