= Knife Lake Township, Kanabec County, Minnesota =

Knife Lake Township, Minnesota
- Township
- Location within Minnesota and the United States Knife Lake Township (the United States)
- Coordinates: 45°56′52″N 93°17′55″W
- Country: United States
- State: Minnesota
- County: Kanabec

Area
  - Total: 31.8 sq mi (82.4 km^{2})
  - Land: 30.7 sq mi (79.4 km^{2})
  - Water: 1.2 sq mi (3.0 km^{2})
- Elevation: 1,056 ft (322 m)

Population (2020)
  - Total: 1,212
  - Density: 34/sq mi (13.2/km^{2})
- Time zone: UTC-6 (Central (CST))
  - Summer (DST): UTC-5 (CDT)
- ZIP code: 55051
- Area code: 320
- FIPS code: 27-33560
- GNIS feature ID: 0664641
- Website: https://knifelaketownship.org/

Knife Lake Township is a township in Kanabec County, Minnesota, United States. The population was 1,212 at the 2020 census.

== Geography ==
According to the United States Census Bureau, the township has a total area of 31.8 square miles (82 km^{2}), of which 30.7 square miles (80 km^{2}) is land and 1.1 square miles (2.8 km^{2}) (3.61%) is water.

== Demographics ==
At the 2020 census, there were 1,212 people, 488 households, and 359 families residing in the township. The population density was 39.4 per square mile (15.2/km^{2}). There were 649 housing units at an average density of 21.1 per square mile (8.1/km^{2}). The racial make-up of the township was 96.20% White, 0.33% African American, 0.41% Native American, 0.58% Asian, 0.33% from other races and 2.15% from two or more races. Hispanic or Latino of any race were 1.16% of the population.

There were 488 households, of which 29.9% had children under the age of 18 living with them, 56.6% were married couples living together, 5.1% had a female householder with no spouse present and 11.9% had a male householder with no spouse present. 26.4% were non-families. 18.9% of all households were made up of individuals and 8.2% had someone living alone who was 65 years of age or older. The average household size was 2.66 and the average family size was 3.03.

24.2% of the population were under the age of 18, 4.5% from 18 to 24, 21.3% from 25 to 44, 32.5% from 45 to 64 and 17.6% were 65 years of age or older. The median age was 45 years. For every 100 females, there were 90.9 males.

The median household income was $102,692 and the median family income was $106,417. Males had a median income of $74,250 and females $21,625. The per capita income $42,132. About 6.7% of the population were below the poverty line, including 5.1% of those under age 18 and 3.5% of those age 65 or over.
