= Rice Creek (Snake River tributary) =

Stream in Minnesota, U.S.

Coordinates: 45°47′42″N 93°11′44″W

Rice Creek is a stream in the U.S. state of Minnesota. It is a tributary of the Snake River.

Rice Creek was named for the abundant wild rice near the stream.

== See also ==
- List of rivers of Minnesota
