= Isanti Township, Isanti County, Minnesota =

Township in Minnesota, United States

Isanti Township
- Township
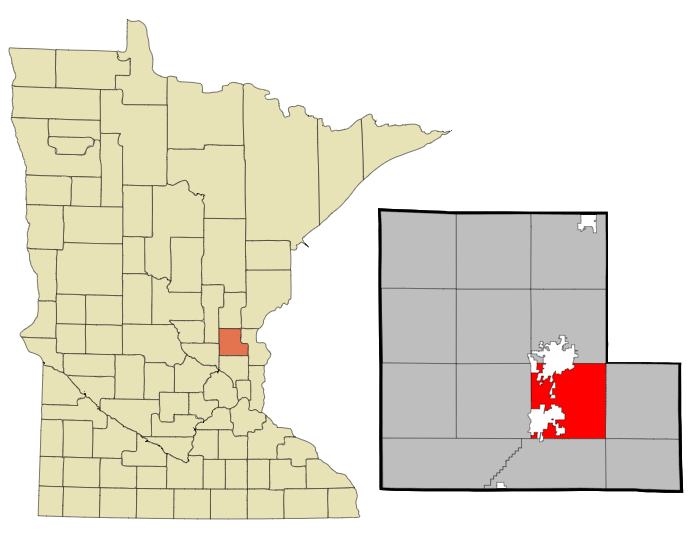
- Location of the township of Isanti within Isanti County, Minnesota
- Coordinates: 45°31′37″N 93°13′21″W
- Country: United States
- State: Minnesota
- County: Isanti

Area
  - Total: 31.5 sq mi (81.5 km^{2})
  - Land: 30.6 sq mi (79.3 km^{2})
  - Water: 0.85 sq mi (2.2 km^{2})
- Elevation: 974 ft (297 m)

Population (2000)
  - Total: 2,364
  - Density: 77/sq mi (29.8/km^{2})
- Time zone: UTC-6 (Central (CST))
  - Summer (DST): UTC-5 (CDT)
- ZIP code: 55040
- Area code: 763
- FIPS code: 27-31346
- GNIS feature ID: 0664560

Isanti Township is a township in Isanti County, Minnesota, United States. The population was 2,364 at the 2000 census.

== Geography ==
According to the United States Census Bureau, the township has a total area of 31.5 square miles (82 km^{2}), of which 30.6 square miles (79 km^{2}) is land and 0.9 square miles (2.3 km^{2}) (2.70%) is water.

== Demographics ==
Historical population
Census	Pop.	Note	%±
1870	458		—
1880	769		67.9%
1890	798		3.8%
1900	1,161		45.5%
1910	1,136		−2.2%
1920	1,050		−7.6%
1930	898		−14.5%
1940	882		−1.8%
1950	755		−14.4%
1960	1,172		55.2%
1970	1,647		40.5%
1980	2,239		35.9%
1990	1,800		−19.6%
2000	2,364		31.3%
2010	2,313		−2.2%
U.S. Decennial Census

As of the census of 2000, there were 2,364 people, 775 households, and 640 families residing in the township. The population density was 77.2 inhabitants per square mile (29.8/km^{2}). There were 807 housing units at an average density of 26.4 per square mile (10.2/km^{2}). The racial makeup of the township was 97.72% White, 0.21% African American, 0.76% Native American, 0.38% Asian, 0.04% from other races, and 0.89% from two or more races. Hispanic or Latino of any race were 1.23% of the population.

There were 775 households, out of which 45.4% had children under the age of 18 living with them, 73.3% were married couples living together, 5.0% had a female householder with no husband present, and 17.3% were non-families. 13.2% of all households were made up of individuals, and 3.2% had someone living alone who was 65 years of age or older. The average household size was 3.05 and the average family size was 3.35.

In the township the population was spread out, with 32.9% under the age of 18, 6.7% from 18 to 24, 30.3% from 25 to 44, 23.5% from 45 to 64, and 6.6% who were 65 years of age or older. The median age was 35 years. For every 100 females, there were 98.7 males. For every 100 females age 18 and over, there were 106.4 males.

The median income for a household in the township was $56,336, and the median income for a family was $57,500. Males had a median income of $41,486 versus $27,386 for females. The per capita income for the township was $20,635. About 2.3% of families and 2.9% of the population were below the poverty line, including 3.1% of those under age 18 and none of those age 65 or over.
