= Grass Lake (Kanabec County, Minnesota) =

Lake in Kanabec County, Minnesota, United States

- Location within Minnesota
- Location: Kanabec County, Minnesota
- Coordinates: 45°46′30″N 93°9′40″W
- Type: lake

Grass Lake is a lake in Kanabec County, in the U.S. state of Minnesota.

Grass Lake was named for the abundant marsh grass in the lake.

== See also ==
- List of lakes in Minnesota
