= McKinney Creek =

Coordinates: 49°03′07″N 119°07′07″W

McKinney Creek is located in the Boundary Country region of British Columbia. The creek is one of the main tributaries of Rock Creek. McKinney Creek flows into Rock Creek from the west. The creek has been mined by Europeans and Chinese miners.
