= Pomroy Lake =

Lake in the state of Minnesota, United States

- Location within Minnesota
- Location: Kanabec County, Minnesota
- Coordinates: 46°0′41″N 93°11′11″W
- Type: lake

Pomroy Lake is a lake in Kanabec County, in the U.S. state of Minnesota.

Pomroy Lake was named for John Pomroy, a lumberman.

== See also ==
- List of lakes in Minnesota
