= Arthur Township, Traverse County, Minnesota =

Township in Minnesota, United States

Arthur Township, Minnesota
- Township
- Location within the state of Minnesota Arthur Township, Minnesota (the United States)
- Coordinates: 45°38′29″N 96°42′24″W
- Country: United States
- State: Minnesota
- County: Traverse

Area
  - Total: 36.4 sq mi (94.2 km^{2})
  - Land: 36.1 sq mi (93.4 km^{2})
  - Water: 0.31 sq mi (0.8 km^{2})
- Elevation: 1,152 ft (351 m)

Population (2000)
  - Total: 109
  - Density: 3.1/sq mi (1.2/km^{2})
- Time zone: UTC-6 (Central (CST))
  - Summer (DST): UTC-5 (CDT)
- FIPS code: 27-02314
- GNIS feature ID: 0663462

Arthur Township is a township in Traverse County, Minnesota, United States. The population was 109 at the 2000 census.

== History ==
Arthur Township was originally called Hoff Township, for settler Abel Hoff, and under the latter name was organized in 1881. The present name is after Arthur, Ontario.

== Geography ==
According to the United States Census Bureau, the township has a total area of 36.4 square miles (94 km^{2}), of which 36.0 square miles (93 km^{2}) is land and 0.3 square miles (0.78 km^{2}) (0.91%) is water.

== Demographics ==
As of the census of 2000, there were 109 people, 37 households, and 31 families residing in the township. The population density was 3.0 inhabitants per square mile (1.2/km^{2}). There were 42 housing units at an average density of 1.2 per square mile (0.46/km^{2}). The racial makeup of the township was 100.00% White.

There were 37 households, out of which 40.5% had children under the age of 18 living with them, 78.4% were married couples living together, 2.7% had a female householder with no husband present, and 16.2% were non-families. 16.2% of all households were made up of individuals, and 8.1% had someone living alone who was 65 years of age or older. The average household size was 2.95 and the average family size was 3.29.

In the township the population was spread out, with 30.3% under the age of 18, 6.4% from 18 to 24, 26.6% from 25 to 44, 23.9% from 45 to 64, and 12.8% who were 65 years of age or older. The median age was 39 years. For every 100 females, there were 142.2 males. For every 100 females age 18 and over, there were 117.1 males.

The median income for a household in the township was $31,563, and the median income for a family was $43,393. Males had a median income of $28,750 versus $18,750 for females. The per capita income for the township was $10,334. There were 17.4% of families and 20.7% of the population living below the poverty line, including 20.0% of under eighteens and 20.0% of those over 64.
