= Venjan =

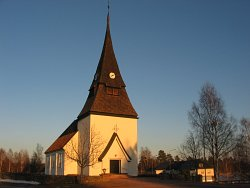
- Venjan Church in April 2005

- Location within Dalarna Location within Sweden
- Coordinates: 60°57′10″N 13°54′38″E
- Country: Sweden
- Province: Dalarna
- County: Dalarna County
- Municipality: Mora Municipality

Area
  - Total: 2.01 km^{2} (0.78 sq mi)

Population (31 December 2010)
  - Total: 295
  - Density: 147/km^{2} (380/sq mi)
- Time zone: UTC+1 (CET)
  - Summer (DST): UTC+2 (CEST)

Venjan is a locality situated in Mora Municipality, Dalarna County, Sweden with 295 inhabitants in 2010.
