= Groundhouse River =

River in eastern Minnesota, United States

- Mouth of the Groundhouse River

Location
- Country: United States
- State: Minnesota
- Counties: Kanabec, Mille Lacs

Physical characteristics
- Source
  - coordinates: 45.9752372°N 93.5674621°W
- Mouth
  - coordinates: 45.8107936°N 93.2621676°W
- Length: 39.8 mi-long (64.1 km)

Basin features
- Progression: Groundhouse River→ Snake River→ St. Croix River→ Mississippi River→ Gulf of Mexico
- River system: Snake River

The Groundhouse River is a 39.8-mile-long (64.1 km) tributary of the Snake River in eastern Minnesota. Via the Snake River and St. Croix River, it is part of the Mississippi River watershed flowing to the Gulf of Mexico.

== See also ==
- List of rivers of Minnesota
- List of longest streams of Minnesota
