= Springvale Township, Isanti County, Minnesota =

Township in Minnesota, United States

Springvale Township
- Township
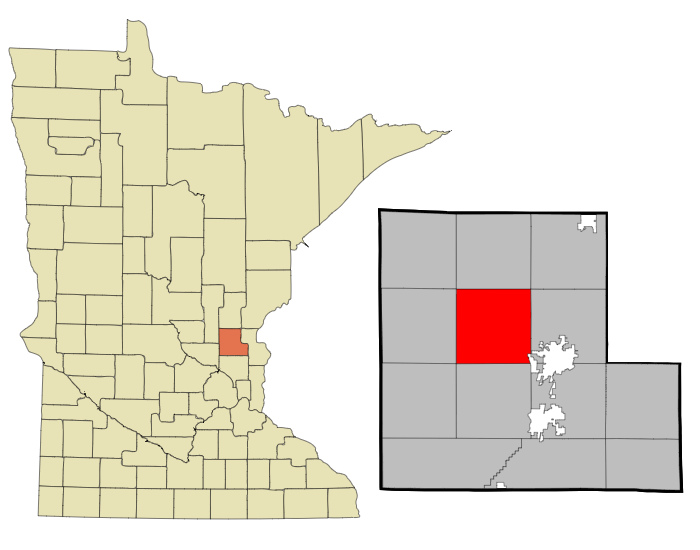
- Location of the township of Springvale within Isanti County, Minnesota
- Coordinates: 45°35′34″N 93°20′1″W
- Country: United States
- State: Minnesota
- County: Isanti

Area
  - Total: 35.3 sq mi (91.5 km^{2})
  - Land: 34.9 sq mi (90.3 km^{2})
  - Water: 0.46 sq mi (1.2 km^{2})
- Elevation: 958 ft (292 m)

Population (2000)
  - Total: 1,384
  - Density: 40/sq mi (15.3/km^{2})
- Time zone: UTC-6 (Central (CST))
  - Summer (DST): UTC-5 (CDT)
- FIPS code: 27-62086
- GNIS feature ID: 0665680
- Website: https://springvaletownship.wordpress.com/

Springvale Township is a township in Isanti County, Minnesota, United States. The population was 1,384 at the 2000 census.

== Geography ==
According to the United States Census Bureau, the township has a total area of 35.3 square miles (91.5 km^{2}), of which 34.8 square miles (90.3 km^{2}) is land and 0.5 square mile (1.2 km^{2}) (1.36%) is water.

== Demographics ==
Historical population
Census	Pop.	Note	%±
1870	93		—
1880	350		276.3%
1890	570		62.9%
1900	747		31.1%
1910	780		4.4%
1920	831		6.5%
1930	721		−13.2%
1940	690		−4.3%
1950	610		−11.6%
1960	580		−4.9%
1970	817		40.9%
1980	1,046		28.0%
1990	1,113		6.4%
2000	1,384		24.3%
2010	1,447		4.6%
U.S. Decennial Census

As of the census of 2000, there were 1,384 people, 475 households, and 388 families residing in the township. The population density was 39.7 inhabitants per square mile (15.3/km^{2}). There were 488 housing units at an average density of 14.0/sq mi (5.4/km^{2}). The racial makeup of the township was 97.83% White, 0.22% African American, 0.72% Asian, 0.22% from other races, and 1.01% from two or more races. Hispanic or Latino of any race were 1.01% of the population.

There were 475 households, out of which 37.9% had children under the age of 18 living with them, 71.4% were married couples living together, 5.9% had a female householder with no husband present, and 18.3% were non-families. 13.3% of all households were made up of individuals, and 3.8% had someone living alone who was 65 years of age or older. The average household size was 2.90 and the average family size was 3.19.

In the township the population was spread out, with 29.6% under the age of 18, 6.3% from 18 to 24, 30.4% from 25 to 44, 26.3% from 45 to 64, and 7.4% who were 65 years of age or older. The median age was 36 years. For every 100 females, there were 105.3 males. For every 100 females age 18 and over, there were 103.1 males.

The median income for a household in the township was $53,942, and the median income for a family was $57,632. Males had a median income of $39,940 versus $25,375 for females. The per capita income for the township was $20,260. About 2.1% of families and 3.7% of the population were below the poverty line, including 3.4% of those under age 18 and 7.5% of those age 65 or over.
