= Little Grassy Lake (Florida) =

Lake in the state of Florida, United States

- Location within Florida Location within the United States
- Location: south of Lake Placid, Florida
- Coordinates: 27°15′07″N 81°20′31″W
- Type: natural freshwater lake
- Basin countries: United States
- Max. length: 930 ft (280 m)
- Max. width: 885 ft (270 m)
- Surface elevation: 90 ft (27 m)

Little Grassy Lake (occasionally considered to be a smaller part of Grassy Lake) is a nearly-round lake south of Lake Placid, Florida. It has residences on the north shore, U.S. Route 27 is on the east shore and the south and west shores are bordered by woods. It seems U.S. 27 was built on land filled in and that Little Grassy lake was once a cove on Grassy Lake's west side.

Little Grassy Lake only has public access along the public right of way along US 27. There are no public boat ramps or no public swimming areas. No information is available about the types of fish in this lake.
