= Lewis Lake, Minnesota =

Unincorporated community in Minnesota, United States

Lewis Lake
- Unincorporated community
- Location within Minnesota Location within the United States
- Coordinates: 45°46′00″N 93°22′08″W
- Country: United States
- State: Minnesota
- County: Kanabec
- Township: Brunswick Township
- Elevation: 1,010 ft (310 m)
- Time zone: UTC-6 (Central (CST))
  - Summer (DST): UTC-5 (CDT)
- ZIP code: 55006 and 56358
- Area code: 320
- GNIS feature ID: 654794

Lewis Lake is an unincorporated community in Brunswick Township, Kanabec County, Minnesota, United States. The community is located between Braham and Ogilvie.

Kanabec County Roads 4, 12, and 48 are three of the main routes in the community. State Highway 47 (MN 47) is nearby. ZIP codes 55006 (Braham), 56358 (Ogilvie), and 55051 (Mora) all meet near Lewis Lake.

Lewis Lake is located in section 19 of Brunswick Township.
