= Kroschel Township, Kanabec County, Minnesota =

Kroschel Township, Minnesota
- Township
- Location within Minnesota and the United States Kroschel Township (the United States)
- Coordinates: 46°7′56″N 93°6′4″W
- Country: United States
- State: Minnesota
- County: Kanabec

Area
  - Total: 36.1 sq mi (93.4 km^{2})
  - Land: 34.9 sq mi (90.3 km^{2})
  - Water: 1.2 sq mi (3.0 km^{2})
- Elevation: 1,135 ft (346 m)

Population (2000)
  - Total: 218
  - Density: 6.2/sq mi (2.4/km^{2})
- Time zone: UTC-6 (Central (CST))
  - Summer (DST): UTC-5 (CDT)
- FIPS code: 27-33776
- GNIS feature ID: 0664647

Kroschel Township is a township in Kanabec County, Minnesota, United States. The population was 218 at the 2000 census.

Kroschel Township was named for Herman Kroschel, an early settler.

== Geography ==
According to the United States Census Bureau, the township has a total area of 36.0 square miles (93 km^{2}), of which 34.9 square miles (90 km^{2}) is land and 1.2 square miles (3.1 km^{2}) (3.25%) is water.

== Demographics ==
As of the census of 2000, there were 218 people, 96 households, and 64 families residing in the township. The population density was 6.3 inhabitants per square mile (2.4/km^{2}). There were 195 housing units at an average density of 5.6 per square mile (2.2/km^{2}). The racial makeup of the township was 97.25% White, 2.29% Native American, and 0.46% from two or more races.

There were 96 households, out of which 21.9% had children under the age of 18 living with them, 60.4% were married couples living together, 2.1% had a female householder with no husband present, and 33.3% were non-families. 30.2% of all households were made up of individuals, and 19.8% had someone living alone who was 65 years of age or older. The average household size was 2.27 and the average family size was 2.81.

In the township the population was spread out, with 22.9%. Under the age of 18, 4.1% from 18 to 24, 22.0% from 25 to 44, 29.8% from 45 to 64, and 21.1% of people were 65 years of age or older. The median age was 47 years. For every 100 females, there were 96.4 males. For every 100 females age 18 and over, there were 102.4 males.

The median income for a household in the township was $33,611, and the median income for a family was $43,125. Males had a median income of $30,694 versus $23,750 for females. The per capita income for the township was $18,476. About 7.0% of families and 15.7% of the population were below the poverty line, including 14.3% of those under the age of eighteen and 28.9% of those 65 or over.
