= Hillman Township, Morrison County, Minnesota =

Hillman Township, Minnesota
- Township
- Location within the state of Minnesota Hillman Township, Minnesota (the United States)
- Coordinates: 45°57′39″N 93°57′51″W
- Country: United States
- State: Minnesota
- County: Morrison

Area
  - Total: 28.3 sq mi (73.2 km^{2})
  - Land: 28.2 sq mi (73.1 km^{2})
  - Water: 0 sq mi (0.0 km^{2})
- Elevation: 1,319 ft (402 m)

Population (2000)
  - Total: 164
  - Density: 5.7/sq mi (2.2/km^{2})
- Time zone: UTC-6 (Central (CST))
  - Summer (DST): UTC-5 (CDT)
- ZIP code: 56338
- Area code: 320
- FIPS code: 27-29168
- GNIS feature ID: 0664478

Hillman Township is a township in Morrison County, Minnesota, United States. The population was 164 at the 2000 census.

Hillman Township was organized in 1902, and named after Hillman Creek.

== Geography ==
According to the United States Census Bureau, the township has a total area of 28.3 square miles (73 km^{2}), of which 28.2 square miles (73 km^{2}) of it is land and 0.04% is water.

== Demographics ==
As of the census of 2000, there were 164 people, 52 households, and 44 families residing in the township. The population density was 5.8 inhabitants per square mile (2.2/km^{2}). There were 56 housing units at an average density of 2.0 per square mile (0.77/km^{2}). The racial makeup of the township was 99.39% White and 0.61% Native American. Hispanic or Latino of any race were 3.66% of the population.

There were 52 households, out of which 46.2% had children under the age of 18 living with them, 75.0% were married couples living together, and 13.5% were non-families. 13.5% of all households were made up of individuals, and 1.9% had someone living alone who was 65 years of age or older. The average household size was 3.15 and the average family size was 3.47.

In the township the population was spread out, with 31.1% under the age of 18, 11.6% from 18 to 24, 28.0% from 25 to 44, 22.0% from 45 to 64, and 7.3% who were 65 years of age or older. The median age was 34 years. For every 100 females, there were 121.6 males. For every 100 females age 18 and over, there were 151.1 males.

The median income for a household in the township was $45,938, and the median income for a family was $47,917. Males had a median income of $18,750 versus $36,667 for females. The per capita income for the township was $13,345. About 6.4% of families and 7.3% of the population were below the poverty line, including 3.3% of those under the age of eighteen and none of those 65 or over.
