= Dalbo Township, Isanti County, Minnesota =

Township in Minnesota, United States

Dalbo Township
- Township
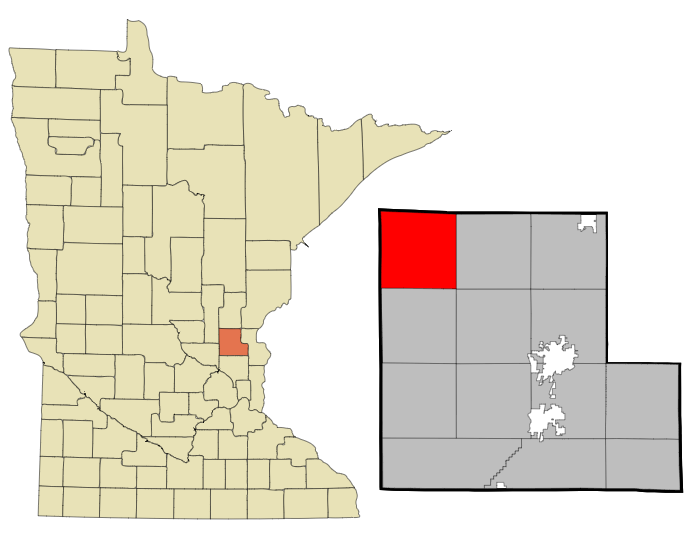
- Location of the township of Dalbo within Isanti County, Minnesota
- Coordinates: 45°40′36″N 93°27′12″W
- Country: United States
- State: Minnesota
- County: Isanti

Area
  - Total: 36.2 sq mi (93.8 km^{2})
  - Land: 35.5 sq mi (91.9 km^{2})
  - Water: 0.77 sq mi (2.0 km^{2})
- Elevation: 1,007 ft (307 m)

Population (2000)
  - Total: 634
  - Density: 18/sq mi (6.9/km^{2})
- Time zone: UTC-6 (Central (CST))
  - Summer (DST): UTC-5 (CDT)
- ZIP code: 55017
- Area code: 763
- FIPS code: 27-14572
- GNIS feature ID: 0663916

Dalbo Township is a township in Isanti County, Minnesota, United States. The population was 634 at the 2000 census.

Dalbo is the only township in Isanti County to be given a Swedish name. Thought to be named in honor of the immigrants from Dalarna, Sweden it is more likely that Dalbo comes from the place of the same name in Dalsland. Dalbo has definite immigrant ties to both Venjan and Älvdalen, in Dalarna.

== Geography ==
According to the United States Census Bureau, the township has a total area of 36.2 square miles (94 km^{2}), of which 35.5 square miles (92 km^{2}) is land and 0.8 square miles (2.1 km^{2}) (2.13%) is water.

== Demographics ==
Historical population
Census	Pop.	Note	%±
1890	266		—
1900	604		127.1%
1910	707		17.1%
1920	825		16.7%
1930	797		−3.4%
1940	761		−4.5%
1950	675		−11.3%
1960	524		−22.4%
1970	595		13.5%
1980	665		11.8%
1990	616		−7.4%
2000	634		2.9%
2010	743		17.2%
U.S. Decennial Census

As of the census of 2000, there were 634 people, 235 households, and 176 families residing in the township. The population density was 17.9 inhabitants per square mile (6.9/km^{2}). There were 253 housing units at an average density of 7.1 per square mile (2.7/km^{2}). The racial makeup of the township was 98.90% White, 0.63% Asian, and 0.47% from two or more races.

There were 235 households, out of which 38.7% had children under the age of 18 living with them, 64.3% were married couples living together, 8.1% had a female householder with no husband present, and 25.1% were non-families. 19.1% of all households were made up of individuals, and 7.2% had someone living alone who was 65 years of age or older. The average household size was 2.70 and the average family size was 3.13.

In the township the population was spread out, with 27.3% under the age of 18, 6.6% from 18 to 24, 31.7% from 25 to 44, 24.3% from 45 to 64, and 10.1% who were 65 years of age or older. The median age was 38 years. For every 100 females, there were 95.1 males. For every 100 females age 18 and over, there were 95.3 males.

The median income for a household in the township was $47,330, and the median income for a family was $49,750. Males had a median income of $36,250 versus $24,625 for females. The per capita income for the township was $18,133. About 3.9% of families and 7.4% of the population were below the poverty line, including 6.6% of those under age 18 and 16.7% of those age 65 or over.
