= Pomroy Township, Kanabec County, Minnesota =

Pomroy Township, Minnesota
- Township
- Location within Minnesota and the United States Pomroy Township (the United States)
- Coordinates: 46°2′23″N 93°7′32″W
- Country: United States
- State: Minnesota
- County: Kanabec

Area
  - Total: 37.7 sq mi (97.6 km^{2})
  - Land: 37.6 sq mi (97.4 km^{2})
  - Water: 0.12 sq mi (0.3 km^{2})
- Elevation: 1,076 ft (328 m)

Population (2000)
  - Total: 390
  - Density: 10/sq mi (4/km^{2})
- Time zone: UTC-6 (Central (CST))
  - Summer (DST): UTC-5 (CDT)
- FIPS code: 27-51874
- GNIS feature ID: 0665335

Pomroy Township is a township in Kanabec County, Minnesota, United States. The population was 390 at the 2000 census.

Pomroy Township took its name from Pomroy Lake.

== Geography ==
According to the United States Census Bureau, the township has a total area of 37.7 square miles (97.6 km^{2}), of which 37.6 square miles (97.4 km^{2}) is land and 0.1 square mile (0.3 km^{2}) (0.27%) is water.

== Demographics ==
As of the census of 2000, there were 390 people, 144 households, and 116 families residing in the township. The population density was 10.4 people per square mile (4.0/km^{2}). There were 185 housing units at an average density of 4.9/sq mi (1.9/km^{2}). The racial makeup of the township was 96.41% White, 0.26% Native American, 0.77% Asian, and 2.56% from two or more races. Hispanic or Latino of any race were 1.03% of the population.

There were 144 households, out of which 29.9% had children under the age of 18 living with them, 69.4% were married couples living together, 6.9% had a female householder with no husband present, and 19.4% were non-families. 13.2% of all households were made up of individuals, and 4.9% had someone living alone who was 65 years of age or older. The average household size was 2.71 and the average family size was 2.98.

In the township the population was spread out, with 24.1% under the age of 18, 5.4% from 18 to 24, 26.4% from 25 to 44, 29.7% from 45 to 64, and 14.4% who were 65 years of age or older. The median age was 42 years. For every 100 females, there were 120.3 males. For every 100 females age 18 and over, there were 120.9 males.

The median income for a household in the township was $41,429, and the median income for a family was $43,000. Males had a median income of $30,938 versus $20,568 for females. The per capita income for the township was $20,134. About 8.8% of families and 10.7% of the population were below the poverty line, including 12.2% of those under age 18 and 5.0% of those age 65 or over.
