= Hillman Township, Kanabec County, Minnesota =

Hillman Township, Minnesota
- Township
- Location within Minnesota and the United States Hillman Township (the United States)
- Coordinates: 46°0′41″N 93°22′13″W
- Country: United States
- State: Minnesota
- County: Kanabec

Area
  - Total: 36.9 sq mi (95.7 km^{2})
  - Land: 36.8 sq mi (95.3 km^{2})
  - Water: 0.15 sq mi (0.4 km^{2})
- Elevation: 1,191 ft (363 m)

Population (2000)
  - Total: 384
  - Density: 10/sq mi (4/km^{2})
- Time zone: UTC-6 (Central (CST))
  - Summer (DST): UTC-5 (CDT)
- FIPS code: 27-29132
- GNIS feature ID: 0664476

Hillman Township is a township in Kanabec County, Minnesota, United States. The population was 384 at the 2000 census.

Hillman Township was named for William F. Hillman, an early settler.

== Geography ==
According to the United States Census Bureau, the township has a total area of 36.9 square miles (96 km^{2}), of which 36.8 square miles (95 km^{2}) is land and 0.2 square miles (0.52 km^{2}) (0.41%) is water.

== Demographics ==
As of the census of 2000, there were 384 people, 165 households, and 116 families residing in the township. The population density was 10.4 inhabitants per square mile (4.0/km^{2}). There were 215 housing units at an average density of 5.8 per square mile (2.2/km^{2}). The racial makeup of the township was 95.31% White, 1.30% Native American, 2.08% Asian, 0.52% from other races, and 0.78% from two or more races. Hispanic or Latino of any race were 2.86% of the population.

There were 165 households, out of which 24.8% had children under the age of 18 living with them, 60.6% were married couples living together, 6.7% had a female householder with no husband present, and 29.1% were non-families. 24.2% of all households were made up of individuals, and 11.5% had someone living alone who was 65 years of age or older. The average household size was 2.33 and the average family size was 2.73.

In the township the population was spread out, with 19.8% under the age of 18, 7.3% from 18 to 24, 25.5% from 25 to 44, 30.7% from 45 to 64, and 16.7% who were 65 years of age or older. The median age was 44 years. For every 100 females, there were 113.3 males. For every 100 females age 18 and over, there were 104.0 males.

The median income for a household in the township was $39,375, and the median income for a family was $44,000. Males had a median income of $30,729 versus $22,813 for females. The per capita income for the township was $16,715. About 7.6% of families and 12.9% of the population were below the poverty line, including 16.1% of those under age 18 and 23.3% of those age 65 or over.
