= Arthur Township, Kanabec County, Minnesota =

Arthur Township, Minnesota
- Township
- Location within Minnesota and the United States Arthur Township (the United States)
- Coordinates: 45°50′51″N 93°19′27″W
- Country: United States
- State: Minnesota
- County: Kanabec

Area
  - Total: 31.3 sq mi (81.1 km^{2})
  - Land: 30.3 sq mi (78.5 km^{2})
  - Water: 1.0 sq mi (2.6 km^{2})
- Elevation: 961 ft (293 m)

Population (2000)
  - Total: 1,905
  - Density: 63/sq mi (24.3/km^{2})
- Time zone: UTC-6 (Central (CST))
  - Summer (DST): UTC-5 (CDT)
- FIPS code: 27-02296
- GNIS feature ID: 0663461
- Website: http://www.arthurtownship.com/

Arthur Township is a township in Kanabec County, Minnesota, United States. The population was 1,905 at the 2000 census.

Arthur Township was organized in 1883, and named for Chester A. Arthur, 21st President of the United States.

== History ==
Mora, a village on the railway in Arthur township, was platted in 1882, when by popular vote it succeeded Brunswick as the county seat. Arthur Township was organized in 1883, and named for Chester A. Arthur, 21st President of the United States.

== Geography ==
According to the United States Census Bureau, the township has a total area of 31.3 square miles (81 km^{2}), of which 30.3 square miles (78 km^{2}) is land and 1.0 square mile (2.6 km^{2}) (3.16%) is water.

== Demographics ==
As of the census of 2000, there were 1,905 people, 672 households, and 538 families residing in the township. The population density was 62.8 inhabitants per square mile (24.2/km^{2}). There were 729 housing units at an average density of 24.1 per square mile (9.3/km^{2}). The racial makeup of the township was 96.64% White, 0.31% African American, 0.42% Native American, 0.58% Asian, 0.52% from other races, and 1.52% from two or more races. Hispanic or Latino of any race were 0.68% of the population.

There were 672 households, out of which 38.7% had children under the age of 18 living with them, 69.3% were married couples living together, 7.4% had a female householder with no husband present, and 19.9% were non-families. 14.6% of all households were made up of individuals, and 5.2% had someone living alone who was 65 years of age or older. The average household size was 2.82 and the average family size was 3.13.

In the township the population was spread out, with 29.1% under the age of 18, 7.2% from 18 to 24, 27.8% from 25 to 44, 25.0% from 45 to 64, and 10.8% who were 65 years of age or older. The median age was 37 years. For every 100 females, there were 103.3 males. For every 100 females age 18 and over, there were 101.5 males.

The median income for a household in the township was $44,485, and the median income for a family was $50,192. Males had a median income of $35,521 versus $24,167 for females. The per capita income for the township was $18,506. About 4.2% of families and 5.9% of the population were below the poverty line, including 5.2% of those under the age of 18 and 7.5% of those 65 and older.
