= Grass Lake Township, Kanabec County, Minnesota =

Grass Lake Township, Minnesota
- Township
- Location within Minnesota and the United States Grass Lake Township (the United States)
- Coordinates: 45°45′58″N 93°11′7″W
- Country: United States
- State: Minnesota
- County: Kanabec

Area
  - Total: 34.8 sq mi (90.2 km^{2})
  - Land: 34.6 sq mi (89.5 km^{2})
  - Water: 0.27 sq mi (0.7 km^{2})
- Elevation: 955 ft (291 m)

Population (2000)
  - Total: 928
  - Density: 27/sq mi (10.4/km^{2})
- Time zone: UTC-6 (Central (CST))
  - Summer (DST): UTC-5 (CDT)
- FIPS code: 27-25406
- GNIS feature ID: 0664330

Grass Lake Township is a township in Kanabec County, Minnesota, United States. The population was 928 at the 2000 census.

== Etymology ==
This township took its name from Grass Lake.

== Geography ==
According to the United States Census Bureau, the township has a total area of 34.8 square miles (90 km^{2}), of which 34.6 square miles (90 km^{2}) is land and 0.3 square miles (0.78 km^{2}) (0.77%) is water.

== Demographics ==
As of the census of 2000, there were 928 people, 340 households, and 263 families residing in the township. The population density was 26.8 inhabitants per square mile (10.3/km^{2}). There were 357 housing units at an average density of 10.3 per square mile (4.0/km^{2}). The racial makeup of the township was 97.41% White, 0.32% African American, 0.54% Native American, 0.11% Asian, and 1.62% from two or more races. Hispanic or Latino of any race were 0.86% of the population.

There were 340 households, out of which 33.5% had children under the age of 18 living with them, 66.2% were married couples living together, 3.8% had a female householder with no husband present, and 22.6% were non-families. 18.5% of all households were made up of individuals, and 4.7% had someone living alone who was 65 years of age or older. The average household size was 2.73 and the average family size was 3.10.

In the township the population was spread out, with 26.8% under the age of 18, 7.8% from 18 to 24, 30.3% from 25 to 44, 24.7% from 45 to 64, and 10.5% who were 65 years of age or older. The median age was 37 years. For every 100 females, there were 111.4 males. For every 100 females age 18 and over, there were 116.9 males.

The median income for a household in the township was $39,083, and the median income for a family was $42,708. Males had a median income of $32,589 versus $21,364 for females. The per capita income for the township was $17,110. About 2.3% of families and 5.7% of the population were below the poverty line, including 7.9% of those under age 18 and 5.9% of those age 65 or over.
