= Brunswick Township, Kanabec County, Minnesota =

Brunswick Township, Minnesota
- Township
- Location within Minnesota and the United States Brunswick Township (the United States)
- Coordinates: 45°46′46″N 93°18′55″W
- Country: United States
- State: Minnesota
- County: Kanabec

Area
  - Total: 35.4 sq mi (91.6 km^{2})
  - Land: 34.6 sq mi (89.7 km^{2})
  - Water: 0.73 sq mi (1.9 km^{2})
- Elevation: 991 ft (302 m)

Population (2000)
  - Total: 1,263
  - Density: 37/sq mi (14.1/km^{2})
- Time zone: UTC-6 (Central (CST))
  - Summer (DST): UTC-5 (CDT)
- ZIP code: 55051
- Area code: 320
- FIPS code: 27-08344
- GNIS feature ID: 0663691

Brunswick Township is a township in Kanabec County, Minnesota, United States. The population was 1,263 at the 2000 census. Originally called Grass Lake Township, it was renamed after the community of Brunswick, Minnesota, in 1883.

== Geography ==
According to the United States Census Bureau, the township has a total area of 35.4 square miles (92 km^{2}), of which 34.6 square miles (90 km^{2}) of it is land and 0.7 square miles (1.8 km^{2}) of it (2.09%) is water.

== Demographics ==
As of the census of 2000, there were 1,263 people, 454 households, and 350 families residing in the township. The population density was 36.5 inhabitants per square mile (14.1/km^{2}). There were 513 housing units at an average density of 14.8 per square mile (5.7/km^{2}). The racial makeup of the township was 97.86% White, 0.08% African American, 0.71% Native American, 0.24% Asian, 0.32% Pacific Islander, and 0.79% from two or more races. Hispanic or Latino of any race were 1.35% of the population.

There were 454 households, out of which 39.9% had children under the age of 18 living with them, 65.2% were married couples living together, 7.7% had a female householder with no husband present, and 22.7% were non-families. 18.5% of all households were made up of individuals, and 5.9% had someone living alone who was 65 years of age or older. The average household size was 2.78 and the average family size was 3.15.

In the township the population was spread out, with 30.6% under the age of 18, 6.0% from 18 to 24, 30.3% from 25 to 44, 23.1% from 45 to 64, and 10.0% who were 65 years of age or older. The median age was 35 years. For every 100 females, there were 113.0 males. For every 100 females age 18 and over, there were 107.8 males.

The median income for a household in the township was $45,278, and the median income for a family was $48,804. Males had a median income of $34,688 versus $23,125 for females. The per capita income for the township was $17,295. About 4.7% of families and 6.4% of the population were below the poverty line, including 9.7% of those under age 18 and 6.1% of those age 65 or over.
