= Kanabec County, Minnesota =

County in the United States

- County
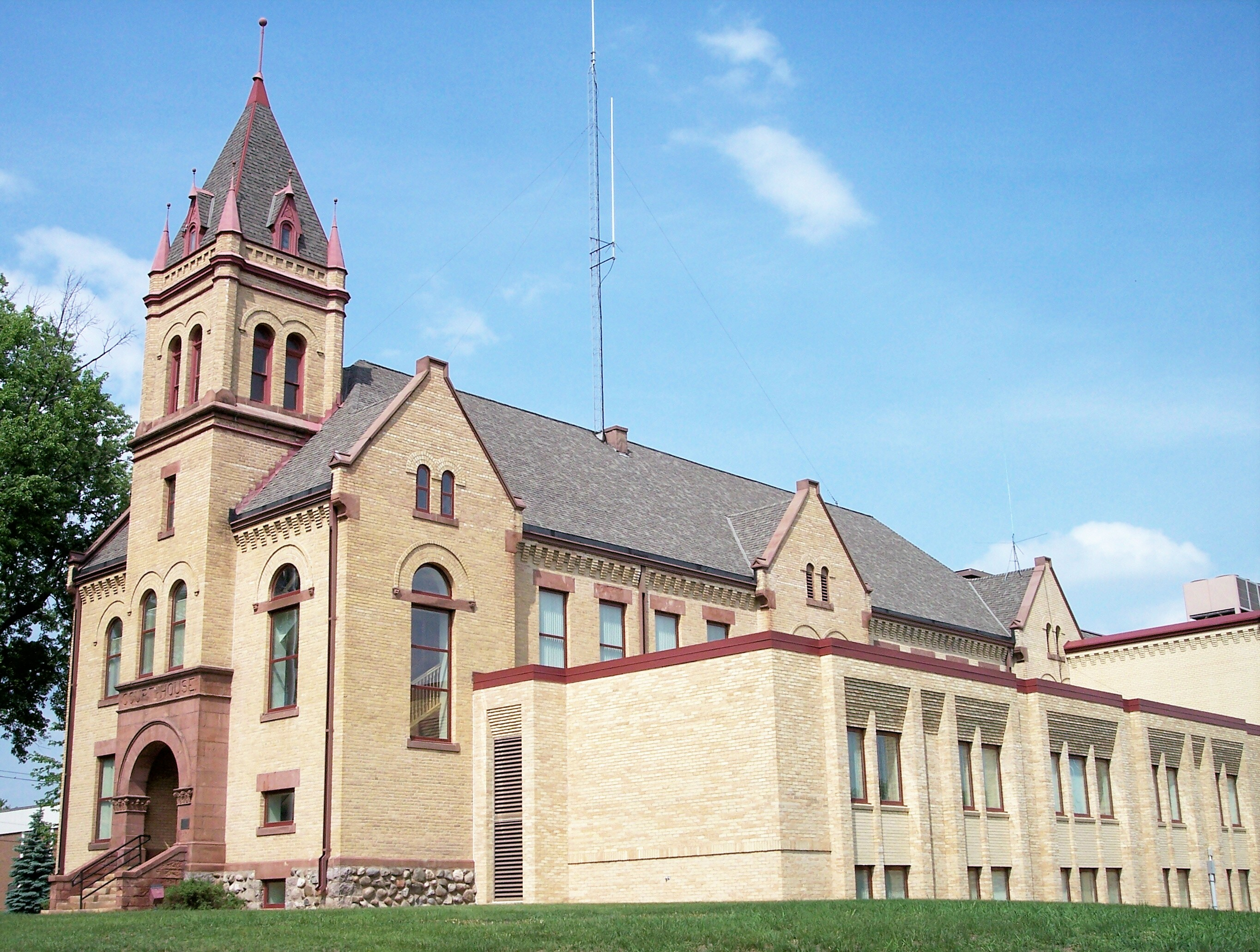
- Kanabec County Courthouse in Mora (2007)

- Location within the U.S. state of Minnesota
- Coordinates: 45°57′N 93°18′W
- Country: United States
- State: Minnesota
- Founded: March 13, 1858 (created); 1882 (fully organized)
- Named for: Snake River
- Seat: Mora
- Largest city: Mora

Area
  - Total: 534 sq mi (1,380 km^{2})
  - Land: 522 sq mi (1,350 km^{2})
  - Water: 12 sq mi (31 km^{2}) 2.3%

Population (2020)
  - Total: 16,032
  - Estimate (2025): 16,628 ▲
  - Density: 30.7/sq mi (11.9/km^{2})
- Time zone: UTC−6 (Central)
  - Summer (DST): UTC−5 (CDT)
- Congressional district: 8th
- Website: www.kanabeccounty.org

Kanabec County (/kəˈneɪbɪk/ kə-NAY-bik) is a county in the east-central part of the U.S. state of Minnesota. As of the 2020 census, the population was 16,032. Its county seat is Mora.

== History ==
The Minnesota legislature authorized the creation of Kanabec County on March 13, 1858, with territory partitioned from Pine County. No county seat was designated at that time, and the county organization was not effected at that time. The county name came from the Ojibwe term ginebig, meaning "snake," after the Snake River — Kanabecosippi (Ginebigo-ziibi in the modern spelling) — which flows through the county.

The area of Kanabec County was attached to Chisago County for administrative and judicial purposes. What county business was handled locally was performed by part-time County Auditor and County Treasurer, in a single room in a stopping place operated by lumber-trader George Staples at Millet Rapids.

In 1871 the county was detached from Chisago, and assigned to Pine County. This assignment lasted through 1881.

The 1870 United States census listed 53 occupants of the Kanabec County area. However, an influx of settlers into its southern areas occurred in the early 1870s, and by 1876 an official county building was needed. A one-room wood building was erected at Millet Rapids, put into use in 1876. In 1881 the county was detached from Pine, and the government structure was finalized, with the county seat being designated at Brunswick. Only one court term was held at Brunswick; in the 1882 general election, a nearly-unanimous vote designated Mora as the county seat. The old courthouse building was sold to a local farmer, who moved it to his property to use as a home. The wood courthouse erected at Mora was used until 1894, when it burned and was replaced by a more fireproof building.

== Geography ==
The Snake River flows south-southeasterly through the central part of the county, fed by Groundhouse River (flowing northeasterly from the county's SW corner) and Red Creek and Mud Creek. The Snake continues easterly into Pine County. The county terrain consists of partly-wooded rolling hills, etched by drainages. It is largely devoted to agriculture. The terrain slopes to the south and east, with its highest point near the NW corner, at 1,309 ft (399 m) ASL. The county has a total area of 534 square miles (1,380 km^{2}), of which 522 square miles (1,350 km^{2}) is land and 12 square miles (31 km^{2}) (2.3%) is water.

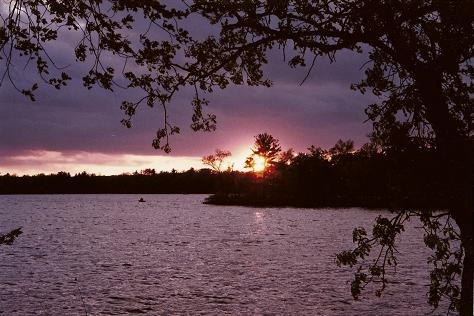
Sunset over Fish Lake in Kanabec County

=== Lakes ===
- Ann Lake
- Bachman Dam
- Bass Lake (part)
- Beauty Lake
- Featherbed Lake
- Fish Lake
- Kent Lake
- Knife Lake
- Lake Eleven
- Lake Five
- Lake Full of Fish
- Lewis Lake
- Long Lake
- Pennington Lake
- Pomroy Lake
- Rice Lake
- Spring Lake
- Thirteen Lake
- White Lily Lake

=== Adjacent counties ===
- Aitkin County - north
- Pine County - east
- Chisago County - southeast
- Isanti County - south
- Mille Lacs County - west

=== Protected areas ===
- Ann Lake State Wildlife Management Area
- Bean Dam State Wildlife Management Area
- Hay-Snake State Wildlife Management Area
- Rice Creek State Wildlife Management Area
- Rum River State Forest (part)
- Tosher Creek State Wildlife Management Area
- Whited State Wildlife Management Area

=== Historic Locations ===
- Ann River Logging Company Farm
- Kanabec County Courthouse
- Knife Lake prehistoric district
- Ogilvie Watertower
- C. E. Williams House
- Zetterberg Company

== Infrastructure ==
=== Airports ===
- Mora Municipal Airport

=== Highways ===
- Minnesota State Highway 23
- Minnesota State Highway 27
- Minnesota State Highway 47
- Minnesota State Highway 65
- Minnesota State Highway 70
- Minnesota State Highway 107

=== County Roads ===
- County Road 1 - County Road 30

== Demographics ==
Historical population
Census	Pop.	Note	%±
1860	30		—
1870	93		210.0%
1880	505		443.0%
1890	1,579		212.7%
1900	4,614		192.2%
1910	6,461		40.0%
1920	9,086		40.6%
1930	8,558		−5.8%
1940	9,651		12.8%
1950	9,192		−4.8%
1960	9,007		−2.0%
1970	9,775		8.5%
1980	12,161		24.4%
1990	12,802		5.3%
2000	14,996		17.1%
2010	16,239		8.3%
2020	16,032		−1.3%
2025 (est.)	16,628	▲	3.7%
U.S. Decennial Census; 1790-1960 1900-1990; 1990-2000 2010-2020

=== Racial and ethnic composition ===
Kanabec County, Minnesota – Racial and ethnic composition Note: the US Census treats Hispanic/Latino as an ethnic category. This table excludes Latinos from the racial categories and assigns them to a separate category. Hispanics/Latinos may be of any race.
Race / Ethnicity (NH = Non-Hispanic)	Pop 1980	Pop 1990	Pop 2000	Pop 2010	Pop 2020	% 1980	% 1990	% 2000	% 2010	% 2020
White alone (NH)	12,029	12,622	14,490	15,606	14,954	98.91%	98.59%	96.63%	96.10%	93.28%
Black or African American alone (NH)	7	16	22	52	65	0.06%	0.12%	0.15%	0.32%	0.41%
Native American or Alaska Native alone (NH)	17	56	117	84	113	0.14%	0.44%	0.78%	0.52%	0.70%
Asian alone (NH)	51	45	66	53	80	0.42%	0.35%	0.44%	0.33%	0.50%
Native Hawaiian or Pacific Islander alone (NH)	x	x	5	3	0	x	x	0.03%	0.02%	0.00%
Other race alone (NH)	12	2	8	3	15	0.10%	0.02%	0.05%	0.02%	0.09%
Mixed race or Multiracial (NH)	x	x	148	224	567	x	x	0.99%	1.38%	3.54%
Hispanic or Latino (any race)	45	61	140	214	238	0.37%	0.48%	0.93%	1.32%	1.48%
Total	12,161	12,802	14,996	16,239	16,032	100.00%	100.00%	100.00%	100.00%	100.00%

=== 2020 census ===
As of the 2020 census, the county had a population of 16,032. The median age was 45.4 years. 21.8% of residents were under the age of 18 and 21.5% of residents were 65 years of age or older. For every 100 females there were 101.8 males, and for every 100 females age 18 and over there were 102.0 males age 18 and over.

The racial makeup of the county was 94.1% White, 0.4% Black or African American, 0.8% American Indian and Alaska Native, 0.5% Asian, <0.1% Native Hawaiian and Pacific Islander, 0.2% from some other race, and 3.9% from two or more races. Hispanic or Latino residents of any race comprised 1.5% of the population.

<0.1% of residents lived in urban areas, while 100.0% lived in rural areas.

There were 6,530 households in the county, of which 26.6% had children under the age of 18 living in them. Of all households, 50.4% were married-couple households, 20.5% were households with a male householder and no spouse or partner present, and 19.6% were households with a female householder and no spouse or partner present. About 27.5% of all households were made up of individuals and 12.5% had someone living alone who was 65 years of age or older.

There were 7,735 housing units, of which 15.6% were vacant. Among occupied housing units, 81.2% were owner-occupied and 18.8% were renter-occupied. The homeowner vacancy rate was 1.6% and the rental vacancy rate was 3.9%.

=== 2010 census ===
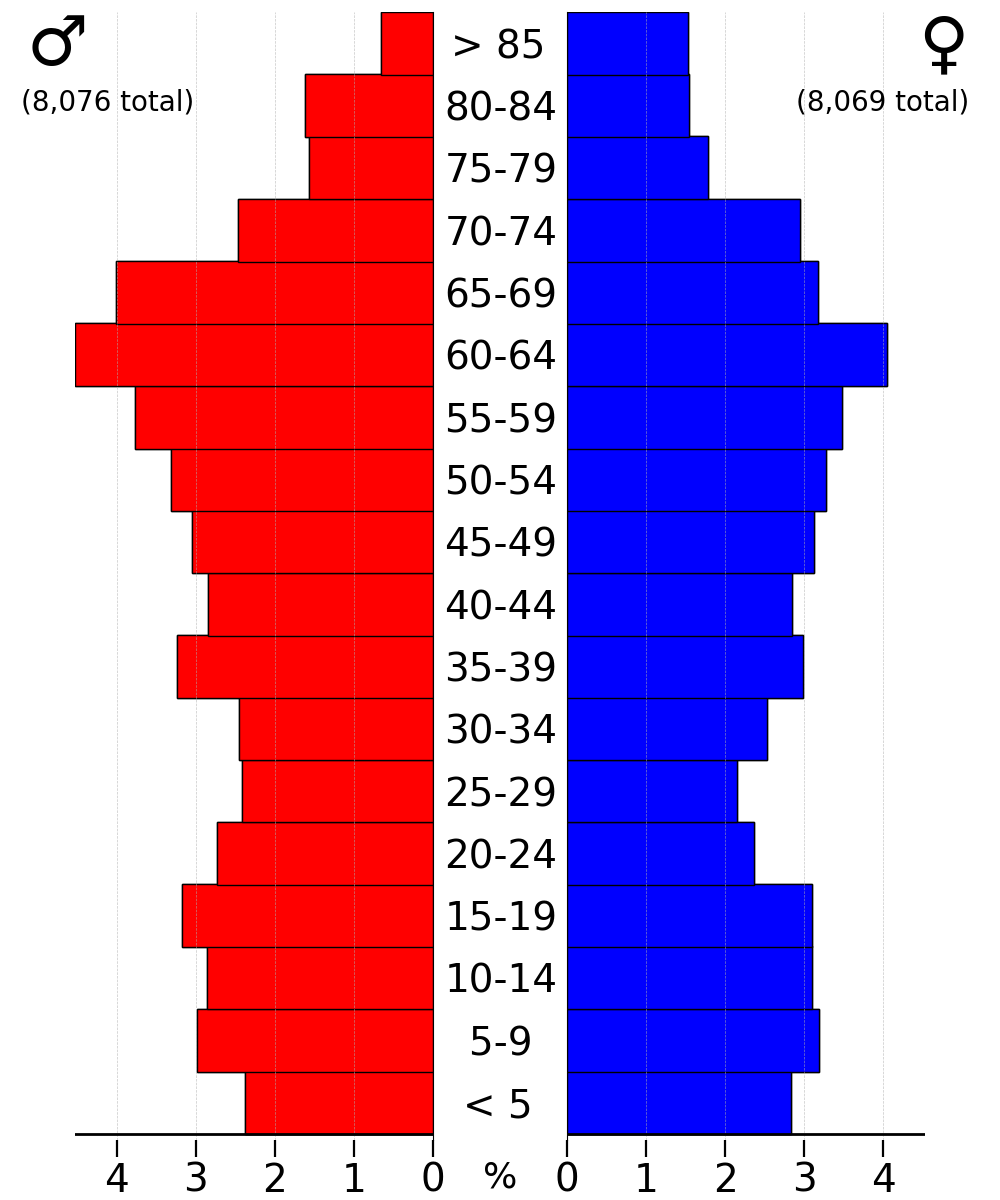
2022 US Census population pyramid for Kanabec County, from ACS 5-year estimates

As of the census of 2010, there were 16,239 people and 6,277 households in the county. The population density was 31.1 per square mile (12.0/km^{2}). There were 7,808 housing units (2014 estimate). The racial makeup of the county was 96.6% White, 0.6% Black or African American, 0.8% Native American or Alaska Native, 0.4% Asian, <0.1% Pacific Islander or Native Hawaiian, and 1.6% from other races or two or more races. 1.7% of the population were Hispanic or Latino of any race.

=== 2000 census ===
As of the 2000 census, 30.2% of the population were of German ancestry, 18.1% Swedish, 13.1% Norwegian, 5.5% American and 5.4% Irish ancestry.

In the census of 2000, there were 5,759 households, out of which 34.10% had children under the age of 18 living with them, 58.80% were married couples living together, 8.40% had a female householder with no husband present, and 28.00% were non-families. 23.80% of all households were made up of individuals, and 10.30% had someone living alone who was 65 years of age or older. The average household size was 2.58 and the average family size was 3.03.

The county population contained 24.0% under the age of 18 and 16.4% who were 65 years of age or older. For every 100 females there were 101.2 males.

The median income for a household in the county was $47,068. The per capita income for the county was $22,291. About 14.2% of the population were below the poverty line.

== Communities ==
=== Cities ===
- Braham (mostly in Isanti County)
- Grasston
- Mora (county seat)
- Ogilvie
- Quamba

=== Unincorporated communities ===
- Brunswick
- Coin
- Grass Lake
- Kroschel
- Lewis Lake
- Warman
- Woodland

=== Abandoned Communities ===
Locations where the US Post office used to operate but no longer exist.

- Bronson
- Fisk
- Heiden
- Hillman
- Mull
- Raritan
- Riverdale

=== Townships ===
- Ann Lake Township
- Arthur Township
- Brunswick Township
- Comfort Township
- Ford Township
- Grass Lake Township
- Hay Brook Township
- Hillman Township
- Kanabec Township
- Knife Lake Township
- Kroschel Township
- Peace Township
- Pomroy Township
- South Fork Township
- Whited Township

== Politics ==
Kanabec County voters have moved toward the Republican Party in the past few decades; since 1980 the county has selected the Republican Party candidate in 67% of national elections (as of 2024).

United States presidential election results for Kanabec County, Minnesota
Year	Republican		Democratic		Third party(ies)	
Year	No.	%	No.	%	No.	%
1860	15	100.00%	0	0.00%	0	0.00%
1868	8	88.89%	1	11.11%	0	0.00%
1872	22	62.86%	13	37.14%	0	0.00%
1876	109	78.99%	29	21.01%	0	0.00%
1880	101	67.79%	48	32.21%	0	0.00%
1884	280	87.50%	40	12.50%	0	0.00%
1888	162	45.25%	82	22.91%	114	31.84%
1892	182	53.53%	38	11.18%	120	35.29%
1896	484	64.11%	256	33.91%	15	1.99%
1900	658	73.44%	210	23.44%	28	3.13%
1904	872	86.08%	106	10.46%	35	3.46%
1908	803	69.52%	242	20.95%	110	9.52%
1912	218	16.99%	270	21.04%	795	61.96%
1916	776	49.02%	608	38.41%	199	12.57%
1920	2,436	75.68%	332	10.31%	451	14.01%
1924	1,507	47.57%	128	4.04%	1,533	48.39%
1928	2,380	68.35%	1,040	29.87%	62	1.78%
1932	1,268	35.17%	2,106	58.42%	231	6.41%
1936	1,350	33.02%	2,579	63.09%	159	3.89%
1940	2,311	50.85%	2,185	48.07%	49	1.08%
1944	1,913	51.52%	1,776	47.83%	24	0.65%
1948	1,531	38.56%	2,305	58.06%	134	3.38%
1952	2,205	55.85%	1,714	43.41%	29	0.73%
1956	1,950	52.80%	1,736	47.01%	7	0.19%
1960	2,278	54.33%	1,890	45.08%	25	0.60%
1964	1,348	33.50%	2,666	66.25%	10	0.25%
1968	1,847	43.48%	2,154	50.71%	247	5.81%
1972	2,395	51.71%	1,969	42.51%	268	5.79%
1976	1,943	36.58%	3,188	60.03%	180	3.39%
1980	2,500	45.39%	2,654	48.18%	354	6.43%
1984	3,027	52.88%	2,660	46.47%	37	0.65%
1988	2,571	45.93%	2,970	53.05%	57	1.02%
1992	1,876	29.83%	2,532	40.27%	1,880	29.90%
1996	1,924	32.35%	2,927	49.21%	1,097	18.44%
2000	3,480	51.09%	2,831	41.57%	500	7.34%
2004	4,527	54.89%	3,592	43.55%	129	1.56%
2008	4,479	52.70%	3,743	44.04%	277	3.26%
2012	4,328	53.10%	3,593	44.09%	229	2.81%
2016	5,230	63.96%	2,327	28.46%	620	7.58%
2020	6,278	67.93%	2,774	30.02%	190	2.06%
2024	6,818	70.27%	2,718	28.01%	167	1.72%

== See also ==
- National Register of Historic Places listings in Kanabec County, Minnesota
