= Minnesota State Highway 65 =

Highway in Minnesota

Trunk Highway 65
- MN 65 highlighted in red

Route information
- Maintained by MnDOT
- Length: 272.511 mi (438.564 km)
- Existed: 1934–present

Major junctions
- South end: I-35W at Minneapolis
- I-94 at Minneapolis; MN 47 at Minneapolis; I-694 at Fridley; US 10 at Blaine; MN 95 at Cambridge; MN 23 at Mora; MN 210 at McGregor; MN 200 at Jacobson; US 2 at Swan River; US 169 near Pengilly, Nashwauk
- North end: US 71 at Littlefork

Location
- Country: United States
- State: Minnesota
- Counties: Hennepin, Anoka, Isanti, Kanabec, Aitkin, Itasca, Koochiching

Highway system
- Minnesota Trunk Highway System; Interstate; US; State; Legislative; Scenic
| ← US 65 | → MN 66 |

Minnesota State Highway 65 (MN 65) is a highway in the east–central and northeast parts of the U.S. state of Minnesota, which starts at its split from I-35W, skipping past the downtown Minneapolis core, only to resume at the intersection with Washington Avenue (Hennepin County Road 152) at the north end of downtown Minneapolis to continue north to its northern terminus at its intersection with U.S. Highway 71 (US 71) in Littlefork near International Falls.

Highway 65 is a four lane expressway between Interstate 694 (I-694) in Fridley to just north of State Highway 95 at Cambridge.

The route continues as a two-lane roadway from Cambridge to its northern terminus at Littlefork in northern Minnesota.

At 272.511 miles (438.564 km) in length, State Highway 65 is the third longest state route in Minnesota, after MN 23 and MN 1.

== Route description ==
MN 65 serves as a north–south highway between Minneapolis, Fridley, Blaine, Cambridge, Mora, McGregor, Nashwauk, and Littlefork in east–central and northeast Minnesota.

The roadway is one of three Minnesota state-marked highways to carry the same number as an existing U.S. Highway within the state; the others being MN 61 and MN 169.

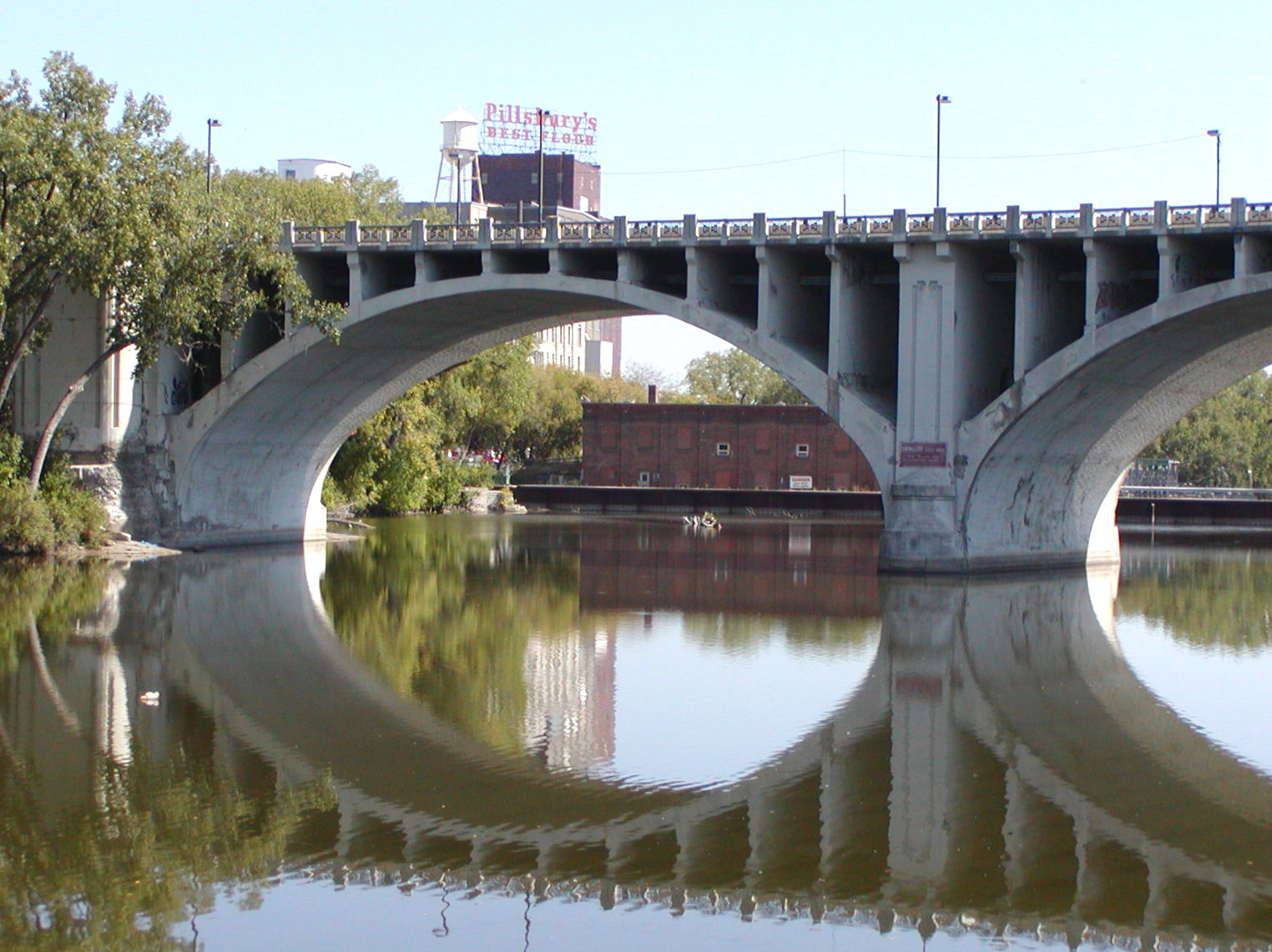
MN 65 as it crosses Saint Anthony Falls in Minneapolis

MN 65 begins at a split from I-35W south of downtown Minneapolis. The ramps end at an intersection with Tenth Street South, and so does the MN 65 designation, after MnDOT returned control of the section through downtown to the city in 2005. The MN 65 designation resumes at the intersection of Washington Avenue (CR 152) and 3rd Avenue South at the north end of downtown Minneapolis. MN 65 is signed locally as 3rd Avenue South in downtown Minneapolis. 3rd Avenue South leads to the Third Avenue (Mississippi River) Bridge and becomes Central Avenue upon crossing the river. After its intersection with Hennepin Avenue, the route becomes Central Avenue NE. MN 65 is signed locally as Central Avenue NE for this section. Many Minnesota landmarks are located on Central Avenue NE including the Aveda Institute, the Heights Theater, and the National Sports Center. The route remains Central Avenue until separating in Ham Lake, except for a split in Fridley and Spring Lake Park between I-694 and US 10.

The route is a divided highway from Minneapolis to Cambridge, with a 60-mile-per-hour (97 km/h) speed limit, increasing to 65-mile-per-hour (105 km/h) speed limit beginning in Ham Lake, just outside Blaine.

For part of its route (23 miles [37 km]), MN 65 runs concurrently with MN 27 in Kanabec and Aitkin counties between Woodland and Rice River Township.

Savanna Portage State Park in Aitkin County is located 11 miles (18 km) northeast of the junction of MN 65 and CR 14 in Shamrock Township near McGregor. The park entrance is located on CR 14 in nearby Balsam Township.

== History ==
MN 65 was authorized in 1934 and 1935. The route was numbered as an extension of old US 65.

By 1940, the route was paved from Minneapolis to just north of McGrath in Aitkin County. By 1949, the route was paved as far north as Libby. By 1953, the route was paved north to its intersection with US 2 at Swan River in Itasca County. Sections of MN 65 north of US 2 were paved in the 1960s and 1970s. The last section of MN 65 paved was through the Nett Lake Indian Reservation in 2000.

The expressway section of MN 65 between I-694 in Fridley to Spring Lake Park was constructed on a new alignment in 1953.

The MN 65 freeway bypass in Cambridge was completed c. 1993.

A portion of MN 65 used to be part of old US 65. US 65 still enters Minnesota from Iowa, but ends now in the city of Albert Lea, where it has a junction with Interstate 35. I-35 and I-35W roughly follow the same route old US 65 used to take from Albert Lea to downtown Minneapolis. Before the freeways were built, the original US 65 had followed Lyndale Avenue between Burnsville and Minneapolis.

In July 2005, the eight-block-long section of MN 65 in downtown Minneapolis, between Washington Avenue and the junction of Tenth Street South with the on- and off-ramps to I-35W, was turned back to city maintenance. This turn-back leaves MN 65 with a gap through downtown. The ramps leading to and going from Minneapolis surface streets south to their junction with I-35W are still part of MN 65 according to state highway logs, and as indicated by the MN 65 shields used on the updated mileposts along those ramps.

It was the last state highway (along with MN 55) to directly run through Downtown Minneapolis, ending a 70-year era in which state trunk highways would have a segment running directly through Downtown Minneapolis.

MN 65 is designated as Legislative Route 105 between Washington Avenue and 37th Avenue Northeast, then as Constitutional Route 5 from Minneapolis to Swan River, then as Legislative Route 159 to Little Fork. The route is not marked with those numbers.

== Cultural district ==
In 2020, Minneapolis officials designated a portion Central Avenue as one of seven cultural districts in the city. The district's boundaries were centered around the intersection of Central and Lowry avenues in the Holland and Windom Park neighborhoods, from 26th to 18th avenues northeast. The purpose of the cultural district was to promote racial equity, preserve cultural identity, and promote economic growth:

== Major intersections ==
| County | Location | mi | km | Exit | Destinations | Notes |
|---|---|---|---|---|---|---|
| Hennepin | Minneapolis | 0.000 | 0.000 | | I-35W south | Southern terminus; I-35W exit 16A |
| Hennepin | Minneapolis | 0.700 | 1.127 | — | I-94 west | Northbound exit and southbound entrance; I-94 exit 233B |
| Hennepin | Minneapolis | 0.981 | 1.579 | | 12th Street | Southbound entrance only |
| Hennepin | Minneapolis | 0.981 | 1.579 | — | 11th Street / E. Grant Street | Northbound exit only |
| Hennepin | Minneapolis | 1.086 | 1.748 | | 10th Street | North end of state maintenance; north end of freeway |
| Hennepin | Minneapolis | 1.861 | 2.995 | | Washington Avenue | South end of state maintenance |
| Hennepin | Minneapolis | 2.004 | 3.225 | Third Avenue Bridge over the Mississippi River | | |
| Hennepin | Minneapolis | 2.544 | 4.094 | | MN 47 north (University Avenue) | |
| Anoka | Fridley | 6.222– 6.499 | 10.013– 10.459 | | I-694 | I-694 exit 38 |
| Anoka | Spring Lake Park | 9.945– 10.288 | 16.005– 16.557 | — | CSAH 10 | Cloverleaf interchange; former US 10 |
| Anoka | Blaine | 10.955– 11.154 | 17.630– 17.951 | | US 10 | Interchange |
| Anoka | Blaine | | | 12A | 99th Avenue | Future partial diamond interchange; northbound exit and entrance, southbound access via frontage road |
| Anoka | Blaine | | | 12B | 105th Avenue | Future roundabout interchange; northbound exit only, southbound access via frontage road |
| Anoka | Blaine | | | 13 | CSAH 12 (109th Avenue) | Future roundabout interchange |
| Anoka | Blaine | | | 14 | 117th Avenue / Cloud Drive | Future diamond interchange |
| Anoka | Blaine | 15.301– 15.646 | 24.625– 25.180 | 15 | CSAH 14 (125th Avenue NE) | Single-point urban interchange, former MN 242 west |
| Isanti | Cambridge | 41.283– 41.931 | 66.439– 67.481 | — | MN 95 – North Branch, Princeton | Access to Cambridge Medical Center and Anoka-Ramsey Community College |
| Isanti | Stanchfield Township | 51.032– 51.153 | 82.128– 82.323 | | MN 107 north – Braham | |
| Kanabec | Brunswick Township | 58.851 | 94.712 | | MN 70 east / CSAH 47 – Rock Creek | |
| Kanabec | Mora | 63.334 | 101.926 | | MN 23 west (Dala Lane) – Ogilvie, Milaca | Southern end of MN 23 overlap |
| Kanabec | Mora | 64.996 | 104.601 | | MN 23 east / CSAH 6 west – Hinckley | Northern end of MN 23 overlap |
| Kanabec | Ford Township | 81.783 | 131.617 | | MN 27 west / CR 82 – Isle, Onamia | Southern end of MN 27 overlap |
| Aitkin | Williams Township | 88.854 | 142.997 | | MN 18 – Finlayson, Malmo | |
| Aitkin | Rice River Township | 105.180 | 169.271 | | MN 27 east – Moose Lake | Northern end of MN 27 overlap |
| Aitkin | McGregor | 116.649 | 187.728 | | MN 210 east – Cromwell, Carlton | Southern end of MN 210 overlap |
| Aitkin | McGregor | 117.850 | 189.661 | | MN 210 west – Aitkin | Northern end of MN 210 overlap |
| Aitkin | Jacobson | 146.784 | 236.226 | | MN 200 west – Hill City | Southern end of MN 200 overlap |
| Aitkin | Jacobson | 147.178 | 236.860 | | MN 200 east – Floodwood | Northern end of MN 200 overlap |
| Itasca | Swan River | 153.704 | 247.363 | | US 2 – Duluth, Grand Rapids | |
| Itasca | Greenway Township | 172.574 | 277.731 | | US 169 south – Grand Rapids | Southern end of US 169 overlap |
| Itasca | Lone Pine Township | 175.243 | 282.026 | | US 169 north – Hibbing | Northern end of US 169 overlap |
| Itasca | Carpenter Township | 208.147 | 334.980 | | MN 1 west – Effie, Northome | Southern end of MN 1 overlap |
| Itasca | Carpenter Township | 212.168 | 341.451 | | MN 1 east – Cook | Northern end of MN 1 overlap |
| Koochiching | Littlefork | 270.020 | 434.555 | | MN 217 east – Littlefork | |
| Koochiching | Littlefork | 270.739 | 435.712 | | US 71 – Big Falls, International Falls | Northern terminus |
1.000 mi = 1.609 km; 1.000 km = 0.621 mi: Concurrency terminus; Incomplete access; Unopened
