= Minnesota State Highway 27 =

State highway in Minnesota, United States

Trunk Highway 27
- MN 27 highlighted in red

Route information
- Maintained by MnDOT
- Length: 247.623 mi (398.511 km)
- Existed: 1934–present
- Tourist routes: Lake Mille Lacs Scenic Byway

Major junctions
- West end: MN 28 near Browns Valley
- US 75 in Wheaton; I-94 / US 52 / MN 29 in Alexandria; US 71 / MN 287 in Long Prairie; US 10 in Little Falls; MN 25 in Pierz; US 169 in Onamia; MN 47 in Isle; MN 65 in Woodland; MN 65 in Rice River Township; MN 73 in Moose Lake
- East end: I-35 near Moose Lake

Location
- Country: United States
- State: Minnesota
- Counties: Traverse, Grant, Douglas, Todd, Morrison, Mille Lacs, Kanabec, Aitkin, Carlton

Highway system
- Minnesota Trunk Highway System; Interstate; US; State; Legislative; Scenic
← MN 26	→ MN 28

Minnesota State Highway 27 (MN 27) is a 247.623-mile-long (398.511 km) state highway in west-central and east-central Minnesota, which runs from its intersection with MN 28 in Browns Valley and continues east to its interchange with Interstate 35 (I-35) in Moose Lake. For part of its route (23 miles), it runs concurrently with MN 65 in Kanabec and Aitkin counties between Woodland and Rice River Township.

== Route description ==
MN 27 serves as an east–west route between Browns Valley, Wheaton, Alexandria, Long Prairie, Little Falls, Mille Lacs Lake, and Moose Lake.

The western terminus for MN 27 is its intersection with MN 28 in Browns Valley, near the Minnesota–South Dakota state line at the Little Minnesota River. The Sam Brown Memorial State Wayside Park is located at the western terminus of MN 27 in Browns Valley.

MN 27 crosses the Mississippi River via the Broadway Bridge in Little Falls.

Charles A. Lindbergh State Park is located immediately south of MN 27 and Little Falls on the Great River Road (CR 52).

Father Hennepin State Park is located on MN 27 at the southeast corner of Mille Lacs Lake, one mile (1.6 km) west of Isle.

MN 27, together with MN 65, passes through the Solana State Forest in Aitkin County.

== History ==
Trunk Highway 10
- Location: Wheaton to Minneapolis
- Length: 185 mi (298 km)
- Existed: 1920–1933

Trunk Highway 54
- Location: Herman to Elbow Lake
- Length: 19 mi (31 km)
- Existed: 1920–1933

Trunk Highway 66
- Location: Isle to Askov
- Length: 42 mi (68 km)
- Existed: 1934–1961

Highway 27 was marked in 1934. It replaced part of former State Highway 10 between Wheaton and Herman and part of State Highway 54 from Herman to Roseville Township; the remainder consisted of either concurrencies or new highways authorized in 1933. At this time, it was paved from Wheaton to Herman, along its overlap with U.S. 52 from Alexandria to Osakis, and from its junction with State Highway 28 to Pierz.

It was paved from Long Prairie to its junction with Highway 28 in 1938, and from U.S. 169 to then-State Highway 56 along the south side of Mille Lacs Lake in 1939.

In the early 1940s, paving was done along short segments west of Wheaton, east of Osakis, west of Lastrup, and west of Moose Lake.

After the end of World War II, the remainder of the highway west of Mille Lacs Lake was paved in stages, with these portions complete by 1955.

In 1958, the roadway was realigned; instead of turning northeastward to travel through McGrath, it continued directly east to intersect Highway 65 at a four-way junction with then-State Highway 66.

Highway 27 was relocated in 1961 along the routing of former State Highway 66 from State Highway 47 south of Isle to Highway 65 at Woodland. The 66 designation was simultaneously reused on another highway in Blue Earth County. Its former alignment from 47 to 65 was renumbered as part of State Highway 18. Also in 1961, the highway was paved from the Aitkin-Carlton county line to the existing pavement near its crossing of the Kettle River.

In 1970, the highway was extended through Moose Lake along former U.S. 61 and County Road 8 to an interchange with the newly built Interstate 35.

The last remaining unpaved section, from Highway 65 to the Aitkin-Carlton county line, was paved in 1974.

In 2012, Highway 27 was moved to overlap with I-94 from Alexandria to Osakis, with the old route turned over to Douglas County maintenance and renamed County Road 82. The highway was then routed along what had previously been State Highway 127 to connect with its existing alignment in Osakis.

== Major intersections ==
County	Location	mi	km	Destinations	Notes
Traverse	Folsom Township	0.000	0.000	MN 28 – Browns Valley, Sisseton	Western terminus
Traverse	Lake Valley Township	17.551	28.246	MN 117 west – Rosholt SD	
Traverse	Wheaton	24.007	38.636	US 75 north – Breckenridge	Western end of US 75 concurrency
Traverse	Wheaton	24.108	38.798	US 75 south – Ortonville	Eastern end of US 75 concurrency
Grant	Herman	40.957	65.914	MN 9	
Grant	Roseville Township	49.160	79.115	CR 54 north – Elbow Lake	Former MN 54
Grant	Roseville Township	54.167	87.173	US 59 – Barrett, Morris	
Grant	Hoffman	58.291	93.810	MN 55 – Glenwood	
Douglas	La Grand Township	63.666	102.460	MN 114 / I-94 Alt. west – Garfield, Lowry	
Douglas	La Grand Township	72.615	116.863	I-94 west (US 52 west) / CSAH 45 / CSAH 46 – Fergus Falls	Western end of I-94 concurrency; I-94 exit 100
Douglas	Alexandria	78.879	126.943	MN 29 – Alexandria, Glenwood	Exit 103 on I-94/MN 27
Douglas	Osakis	92.200	148.382	I-94 east (US 52 east) / CSAH 3 – Westport, St. Cloud	Eastern end of I-94 concurrency; I-94 exit 114
Douglas–Todd county line	Osakis	92.843	149.416	CSAH 82 / CSAH 51 / I-94 Alt. – West Union, Osakis	Former MN 27 west / MN 127 south; previously US 52
Todd	Round Prairie Township	105.191	169.289	US 71 south – Sauk Centre	Western end of US 71 concurrency
Todd	Long Prairie	110.863	178.417	MN 287 – Grey Eagle	
Todd	Long Prairie	111.329	179.167	US 71 north – Wadena	Eastern end of US 71 concurrency
Morrison	Culdrum Township	123.234	198.326	MN 28 west – Swanville	Western end of MN 28 concurrency
Morrison	Pike Creek Township	133.330	214.574	MN 238 south – Albany	Northern terminus of MN 238
Morrison	Little Falls	135.150	217.503	MN 28 end / Great River Road south (Lindbergh Drive) – Lindbergh State Park, Lindbergh Historic Site, Weyerhaeuser Museum	Eastern end of MN 28 concurrency; western end of GRR concurrency
Morrison	Little Falls	135.243	217.653	Great River Road north (Paul Larson Memorial Drive)	Eastern end of GRR concurrency
Morrison	Little Falls	135.257– 135.361	217.675– 217.842	Broadway Bridge over the Mississippi River	
Morrison	Little Falls	136.672– 136.761	219.952– 220.095	US 10 to MN 371 – St. Cloud, Motley, Brainerd	Interchange
Morrison	Genola	148.071	238.297	MN 25 south – Foley	Western end of MN 25 concurrency
Morrison	Buh Township	152.081	244.751	MN 25 north – Brainerd	Eastern end of MN 25 concurrency
Mille Lacs	Onamia	175.634	282.656	US 169 south – Milaca	Western end of US 169 concurrency
Mille Lacs	South Harbor Township	178.306	286.956	US 169 north – Garrison	Eastern end of US 169 concurrency
Mille Lacs	Isle	188.445	303.273	MN 47 north – Aitkin	Western end of MN 47 concurrency
Mille Lacs	Isle Harbor Township	190.615	306.765	MN 47 south – Ogilvie	Eastern end of MN 47 concurrency
Kanabec	Ford Township	194.248	312.612	MN 65 south – Mora	Western end of MN 65 concurrency
Aitkin	Williams Township			MN 18 – Finlayson, MN 47	
Aitkin	Rice River Township	221.259	356.082	MN 65 north – McGregor	Eastern end of MN 65 concurrency
Carlton	Silver Township	240.765	387.474	MN 73 north – Cromwell	Western end of MN 73 concurrency
Carlton	Moose Lake	245.545	395.166	MN 73 south – Twin Cities	Eastern end of MN 73 concurrency
Carlton	Moose Lake Township	247.182– 247.371	397.801– 398.105	I-35 north / CSAH 8 east – Duluth	Interchange, no access to I-35 south; road continues as CSAH 8
1.000 mi = 1.609 km; 1.000 km = 0.621 mi: Concurrency terminus; Incomplete access
