= Greeksters Garage =

Greekster's Garage
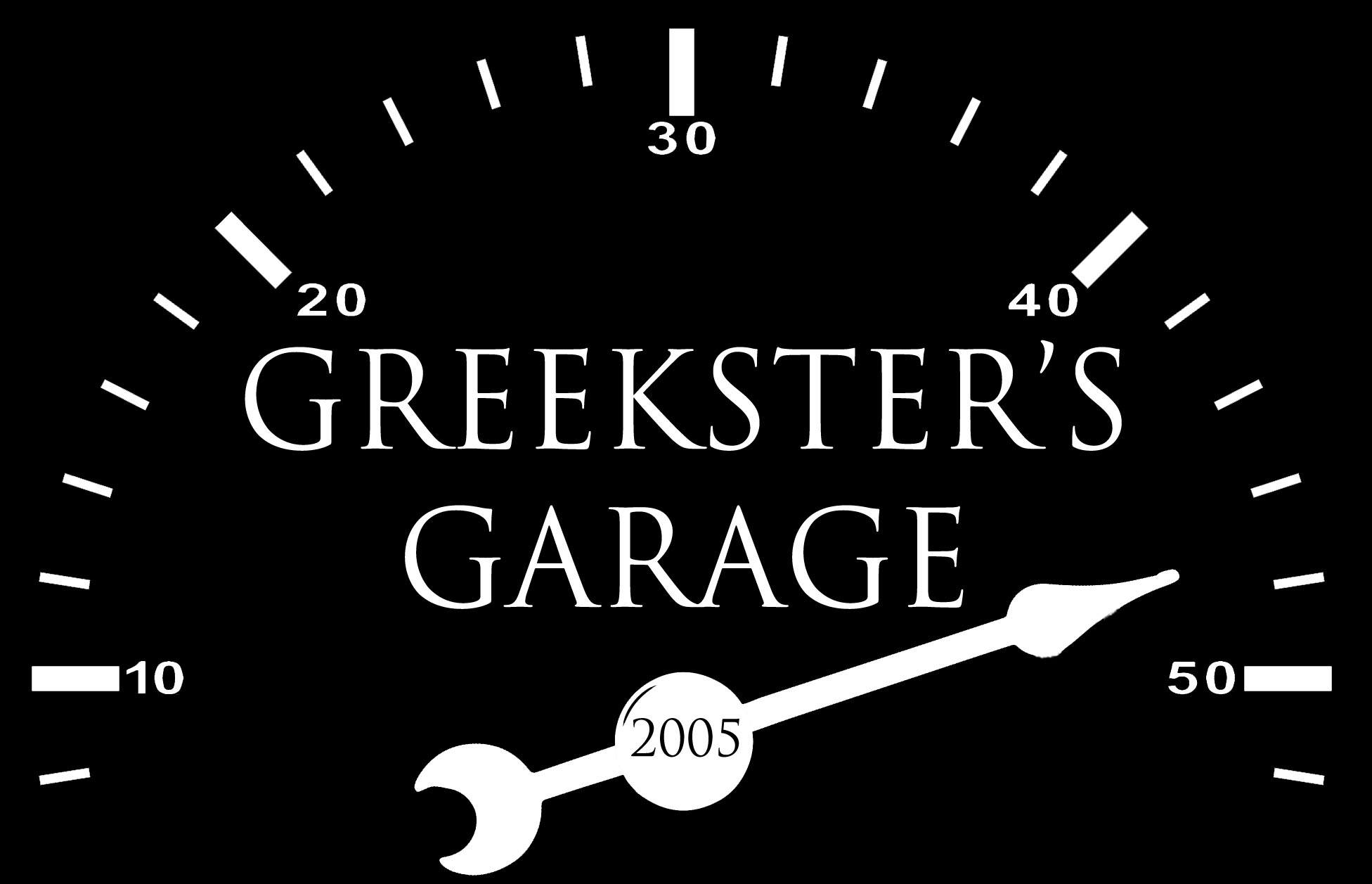
- Company type: Private
- Industry: Automotive building
- Founded: 2005; 21 years ago
- Headquarters: Santa Barbara, California, United States
- Products: Street Rods, Hot Rods, Rat Rods, Muscle Cars, Customs
- Owner: George Pappas
- Website: www.greekstersgarage.com

Greekster's Garage is a car customizer and maker of custom cars in Santa Barbara, California. It was founded in 2005 by George Pappas.

== History ==
Greekster's Garage began as an automotive company specializing in classic automobile restoration and custom hot rod building. In recent years Greekster has created custom vehicles for business corporations such as Spire Federal Credit Union.

In July 2016, it was announced that Edit Light will be producing the first season of Greekster's Garage in a ten episode educational reality show that will cover all aspects of auto building.

== Cast and crew ==
The following includes those that will appear on the TV show Greekster's Garage.

- George Pappas: "The Greekster"
- Larry Wood: "The Mayor"
