= Woodland, Kanabec County, Minnesota =

Unincorporated community in Minnesota, United States

Woodland
- Unincorporated community
- Location within Minnesota Location within the United States
- Coordinates: 46°06′57″N 93°17′03″W
- Country: United States
- State: Minnesota
- County: Kanabec
- Township: Ford Township
- Elevation: 1,240 ft (380 m)
- Time zone: UTC-6 (Central (CST))
  - Summer (DST): UTC-5 (CDT)
- ZIP code: 56342
- Area code: 320
- GNIS feature ID: 655021

Woodland is an unincorporated community in Ford Township, Kanabec County, Minnesota, United States.

The community is located east of Isle at the junction of State Highway 27 (MN 27) and State Highway 65 (MN 65).

Woodland is located 17 miles north of Mora; and nine miles east of Isle and Mille Lacs Lake.

Nearby places include Isle, Warman, Mora, and McGrath.

Hay Creek flows through the community. The Snake River is nearby. Woodland is located within ZIP code 56342, based in Isle. The boundary line between Kanabec and Aitkin counties is near Woodland. Mille Lacs County is also nearby.
