= Minnesota State Highway 10 =

Minnesota State Highway 10 may refer to:

- U.S. Route 10 in Minnesota
- Minnesota State Highway 10 (1920-1933)
