= Blaze Credit Union =

- Formerly: Twin City Co-ops Credit Union (1934-2008); Spire Credit Union (2008-2024)
- Type: Credit unions in the United States
- Industry: Financial services
- Predecessor: Hiway Credit Union
- Founded: 1934; 92 years ago
- Headquarters: Falcon Heights, MN
- Number of locations: 29
- Area served: Minneapolis/St. Paul metro area; State of Minnesota; State of Wisconsin
- Products: Savings account; Checking account; Health savings account (HSA); Individual retirement account (IRA); Vehicle loans; Personal & credit loans; Business loans; Mortgages; Investment services
- Total assets: USD$4 billion
- Members: 255,000
- Website: blazecu.com

Blaze Credit Union is a credit union that was founded as the Twin City Co-ops Credit Union in 1934. Since that time it has undergone several mergers and name changes and took the name Blaze Credit Union in 2023. The credit union is headquartered in Falcon Heights, Minnesota, serves over 255,000 members, and controls more than $4 billion in assets.

== History ==
Blaze was created in 1934 by Edgar Archer, an employee of the Midland Cooperative Oil Association. Edgar Archer needed a loan to be able to pay his debts, so he started a credit union. By February 1934, enough of his fellow workers agreed, and seven of them applied for a certificate of the organization. Blaze was officially incorporated on March 13, 1934. In 2011, Blaze operated ten branches in the Twin Cities area. In July 2014, the organization – then named Spire Federal Credit Union – was voted to change from a federally-chartered into a state-chartered financial institution, and was renamed Spire Credit Union. In 2014, Greater Minnesota Credit Union (GMCU) merged with Spire, adding six branches in the greater Minnesota area. In 2017, Peoples Community Credit Union members approved a merger with Spire, adding a branch location in Hopkins, Minnesota. In 2019, Energy Services Federal Credit Union members approved a merger with Spire, adding a branch location in St. Cloud, Minnesota. In 2019, Electrus FCU voted to merge with Spire. In 2021, Diversified Credit Union voted to merge with Spire, adding a branch location in Waseca, Minnesota. Also in 2021, Central Hanna Employees Credit Union voted to merge with Spire, adding a branch in Keewatin, Minnesota. In 2022, HBI Employees Credit Union voted to merge with Spire. Blaze operates a total of 29 branches.

In 2023, it was announced that Spire Credit Union and Hiway Credit Union were planning on merging, with Spire President and CEO Dan Stolz becoming CEO and Hiway President and CEO Dave Boden becoming President of the new company. Hiway approved the merger in September with the merger being finalized on January 1, 2024. The merged company rebranded as Blaze Credit Union and created the fourth largest credit union in the state of Minnesota.

== Partnerships ==
Blaze Credit Union has multiple active partnerships with many local organizations including the St. Paul Saints (Blaze Home Run Porch, Blaze Sun Deck, Official Checking Account), Minnesota Wild (Official Credit Union, helmet sponsor) the St. Cloud Rox (Official Checking Account), Ogilvie Raceway (Blaze Sky Deck), and the Minnesota United FC (Official Credit Union).
