= Clayton Tonnemaker =

American football player (1928–1996)

- Tonnemaker while playing at Minnesota, c. 1940s

No. 15, 35, 58
- Positions: Center, linebacker

Personal information
- Born: June 8, 1928; Ogilvie, Minnesota, U.S.
- Died: December 25, 1996 (aged 68); St. Paul, Minnesota, U.S.
- Listed height: 6 ft 2 in (1.88 m)
- Listed weight: 237 lb (108 kg)

Career information
- High school: Edison (Minneapolis, Minnesota)
- College: Minnesota (1946–1949)
- NFL draft: 1950: 1st round, 4th overall pick

Career history
- Green Bay Packers (1950–1954)

Awards and highlights
- 3× Second-team All-Pro (1950), 1953, 1954); Pro Bowl (1953); Consensus All-American (1949); Third-team All-American (1948); First-team All-Big Ten (1949); Second-team All-Big Ten (1948)

Career NFL statistics
- Games played: 36
- Games started: 36
- Interceptions: 2
- Stats at Pro Football Reference
- College Football Hall of Fame

Frank Clayton "Clayt" Tonnemaker (June 8, 1928 – December 25, 1996) was an American professional football player who was a center and linebacker for the Green Bay Packers of the National Football League (NFL) from 1950 to 1954. He played college football for the Minnesota Golden Gophers, earning consensus All-American honors at center in 1949. In 1980, he was inducted into the College Football Hall of Fame.

== Early life ==
Tonnemaker, weighing in at 11 pounds, was born on June 8, 1928, on a farm near Ogilvie, Minnesota, to Anna Nelson and Frank Clayton Tonnemaker. After his father died when Clayton was 7, he and his mother and sister, Lucille, sold their farm at auction and moved to the town of Rush City, Minnesota. The family later moved to Northeast Minneapolis, and Clayton attended Edison High School.

== Football career ==
=== Youth ===
Tonnemaker lettered in football at Rush City High School as an 8th grader. After moving to Minneapolis, Tonnemaker played center for the Edison football team, serving as captain and winning All-City Honors. He unofficially played for the Minnesota Gophers while in high school, even scoring a touchdown during a 1946 spring season scrimmage. It was not legal for a high schooler to train with a college team at the time, so the Gophers did not acknowledge this.

=== College: University of Minnesota ===
Tonnemaker officially began playing center linebacker for the Gophers during his freshman year, 1946, when a World War II-era ruling made it legal for freshman to play in the Big Ten. Before the war this was not allowed. He became part of a group of Gopher players known as the '49ers, their year of graduation. He was a regular from mid-freshman year, with the Gophers winning 23 out of 30 games, and a "win-loss edge over every Big Ten rival except Michigan". Along with Leo Nomellini, Tonnemaker was part of a defensive line that allowed "an average of less than nine points a game in the '49ers’ final season".

- Gopher Co-Captain – 1949
- Consensus All-American 1949 (unanimous choice)
- 1949 Look Magazine Eleven (named by the Football Writers Association of America) 1st Team
- 1949 Sporting News All-American
- 1949 Minneapolis Star named him Minnesota's greatest center in football history
- 1949 – # 7 in the Heisman Trophy voting
- Co-Captain of the winning East team in the East–West Shrine Game – December 1949 (scored his only touchdown on an intercepted pass and 70 yard run)
- Co-Captain of the All-Star Team at the Chicago College All-Star Game that beat the Philadelphia Eagles 17–7 – August 1950

=== Professional: Green Bay Packers ===
Originally drafted in the first round of the 1950 NFL draft by the San Francisco 49ers, his pro contract was transferred to the Green Bay Packers after the All-America Football Conference merged with the NFL in 1950 and the rules changed. The Packers made him their number one National Football League draft pick in 1950 (4th in the NFL overall), and paid him $8,000 a year, the top salary on the team. Tonnemaker played center and middle linebacker.

- Named All-Pro in his rookie season (1950) and again after his war service in 1953
- Picked to play in the first Pro Bowl ever (January 14, 1951) but missed it because he had to report for Army duty
- Captain 1953/1954
- Played from 1950–54

=== Honors and awards ===
- Minnesota Football Hall of Fame: 1946, 47, 48, 49
- National Football Foundation College Football Hall of Fame: 1980
- Played on 10 teams and named the captain of each one
- Chicago Tribune All-Time All-Big Ten Team – Center
- State of Minnesota Football Hall of Fame – 1981
- Gopher Men's Sports Hall of Fame – 1992

== Career ==
- Served in the Korean War for 32 months, 18 months as a lieutenant in the Medical Service Corps in Japan.
- Left the Green Bay Packers in 1954 to begin a 22-year career with Cargill; achieved VP status
- 1961–1965 – NFL football commentator on CBS
- 1979 – Became President of Coal Creek Mining Co in Ashland, Montana
- Tonnemaker spent the last years of his life in Minnesota and Wisconsin, close to his family, where he was involved in private business ventures.
