= Isle, Minnesota =

City in Minnesota, United States

Isle, Minnesota Chi-minising
- City
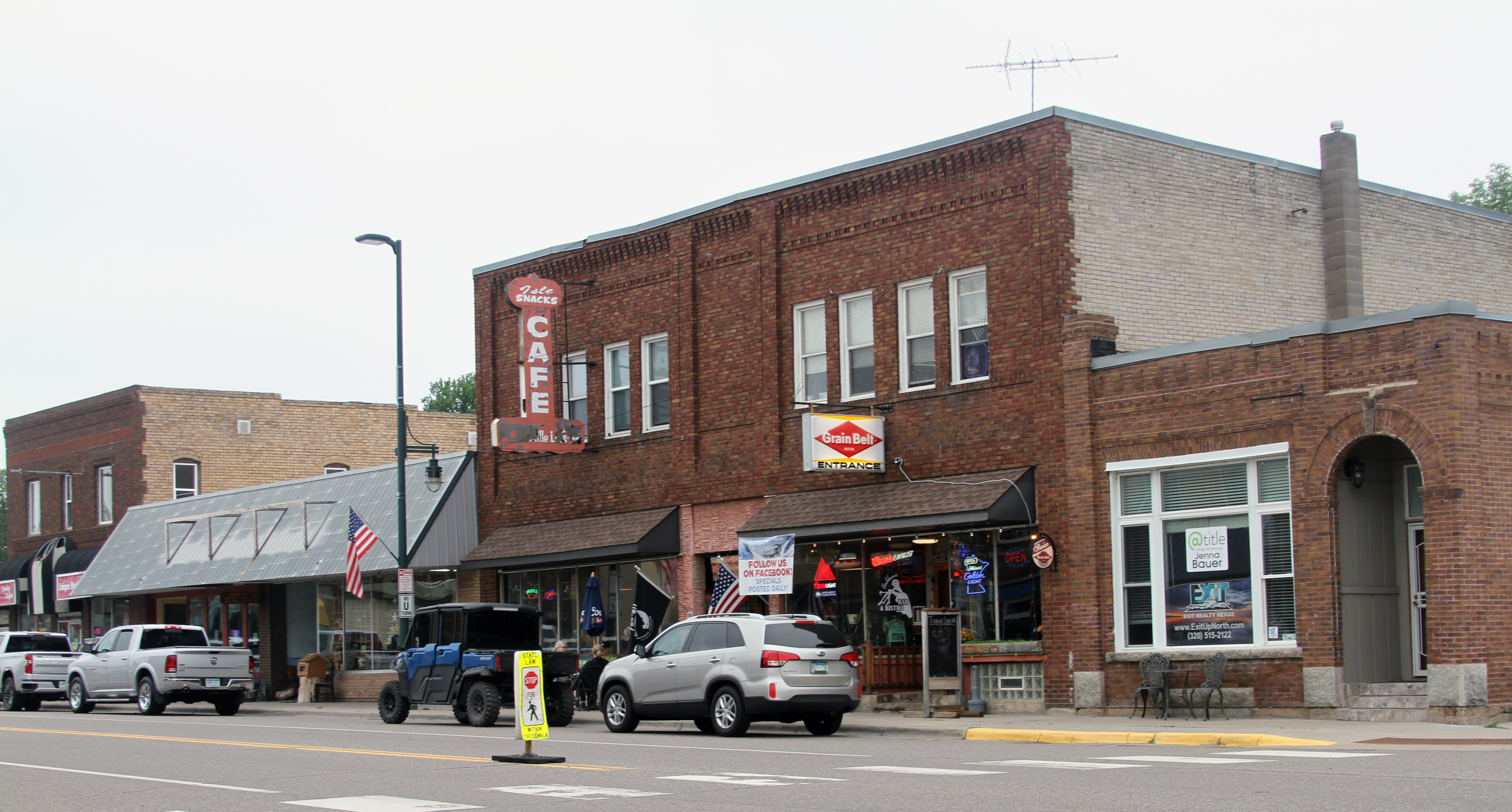
- Businesses in Isle

- Logo
- Nickname: "The Little City on the Big Lake"
- Location in Mille Lacs County and the state of Minnesota
- Coordinates: 46°8′26″N 93°28′0″W
- Country: United States
- State: Minnesota
- County: Mille Lacs
- Incorporated: November 1, 1913

Government
  - Mayor: Ernie Frie

Area
  - Total: 3.14 sq mi (8.12 km^{2})
  - Land: 2.70 sq mi (6.99 km^{2})
  - Water: 0.44 sq mi (1.13 km^{2})
- Elevation: 1,276 ft (389 m)

Population (2020)
  - Total: 803
  - Density: 297.6/sq mi (114.91/km^{2})
- Time zone: UTC-6 (Central (CST))
  - Summer (DST): UTC-5 (CDT)
- ZIP code: 56342
- Area code: 320
- FIPS code: 27-31472
- GNIS feature ID: 0645530
- Website: www.cityofisle.com

Isle is a city in Mille Lacs County, Minnesota, United States. The population was 803 at the 2020 census, up from 751 in 2010.

== History ==
A post office called Isle has been in operation since 1896. The city was named for the island near its harbor on Mille Lacs Lake.

Isle was platted in 1906 and incorporated as a village in 1913.

== Geography ==
Isle is in northeastern Mille Lacs County, along Isle Harbor at the southeasternmost extent of Mille Lacs Lake. Minnesota Highway 27 and Minnesota Highway 47 are two of the main routes in the community. Highway 27 leads southwest 3 miles (5 km) to Wahkon and 12 miles (19 km) to Onamia, while Highway 47 leads north 15 miles (24 km) up the east shore of Mille Lacs Lake to Malmo. Together, the two highways leave Isle to the southeast, with Highway 27 leading east 10 miles (16 km) to Woodland and Highway 47 leading south 22 miles (35 km) to Ogilvie.

According to the U.S. Census Bureau, the city of Isle has an area of 3.13 square miles (8.11 km^{2}), of which 2.70 square miles (6.99 km^{2}) are land and 0.44 square miles (1.14 km^{2}), or 13.9%, are water. The water area includes part of Isle Harbor in Mille Lacs Lake, as well as Anderson Lake in the northeast. Mille Lacs Lake drains at its southwest end into the Rum River, a tributary of the Mississippi River.

Isle is locally known as the "walleye capital of the world" because of its location on Mille Lacs Lake.

== Schools ==
Isle's school district is Isle Public Schools. The team name is the Mille Lacs Raiders. It used to be the Isle Huskies. There are three main schools in this district: Nyquist Elementary, Isle High School, and the Alternative Learning Center (ALC). The elementary school goes from pre-k to sixth grade. The high school goes from 7th to 12th grades. The ALC is an alternative secondary school. It is near Mille Lacs lake.

== Demographics ==
Historical population
Census	Pop.	Note	%±
1920	328		—
1930	523		59.5%
1940	567		8.4%
1950	674		18.9%
1960	529		−21.5%
1970	551		4.2%
1980	573		4.0%
1990	566		−1.2%
2000	707		24.9%
2010	751		6.2%
2020	803		6.9%
U.S. Decennial Census

=== 2010 census ===
As of the census of 2010, there were 751 people, 352 households, and 195 families living in the city. The population density was 354.2 inhabitants per square mile (136.8/km^{2}). There were 501 housing units at an average density of 236.3 per square mile (91.2/km^{2}). The racial makeup of the city was 73.8% White, 22.6% Native American, 0.1% Asian, 0.8% from other races, and 2.7% from two or more races. Hispanic or Latino of any race were 3.1% of the population.

There were 352 households, of which 23.9% had children under the age of 18 living with them, 39.5% were married couples living together, 11.1% had a female householder with no husband present, 4.8% had a male householder with no wife present, and 44.6% were non-families. 39.2% of all households were made up of individuals, and 21.6% had someone living alone who was 65 years of age or older. The average household size was 2.13 and the average family size was 2.84.

The median age in the city was 47.5 years. 23.4% of residents were under the age of 18; 4.7% were between the ages of 18 and 24; 20% were from 25 to 44; 23.9% were from 45 to 64; and 28.2% were 65 years of age or older. The gender makeup of the city was 45.5% male and 54.5% female.

=== 2000 census ===
As of the census of 2000, there were 707 people, 323 households, and 198 families living in the city. The population density was 336.0 inhabitants per square mile (129.7/km^{2}). There were 414 housing units at an average density of 196.8 per square mile (76.0/km^{2}). The racial makeup of the city was 87.13% White, 11.74% Native American, 0.14% Asian, and 0.99% from two or more races. Hispanic or Latino of any race were 0.42% of the population.

There were 323 households, out of which 23.2% had children under the age of 18 living with them, 46.4% were married couples living together, 10.5% had a female householder with no husband present, and 38.4% were non-families. 35.3% of all households were made up of individuals, and 21.1% had someone living alone who was 65 years of age or older. The average household size was 2.19 and the average family size was 2.81.

In the city, the population was spread out, with 22.2% under the age of 18, 7.4% from 18 to 24, 21.4% from 25 to 44, 24.2% from 45 to 64, and 24.9% who were 65 years of age or older. The median age was 44 years. For every 100 females, there were 91.6 males. For every 100 females age 18 and over, there were 87.1 males.

The median income for a household in the city was $32,375, and the median income for a family was $37,250. Males had a median income of $27,083 versus $21,731 for females. The per capita income for the city was $19,609. About 3.2% of families and 5.6% of the population were below the poverty line, including 2.8% of those under age 18 and 9.4% of those age 65 or over.

== Gallery ==
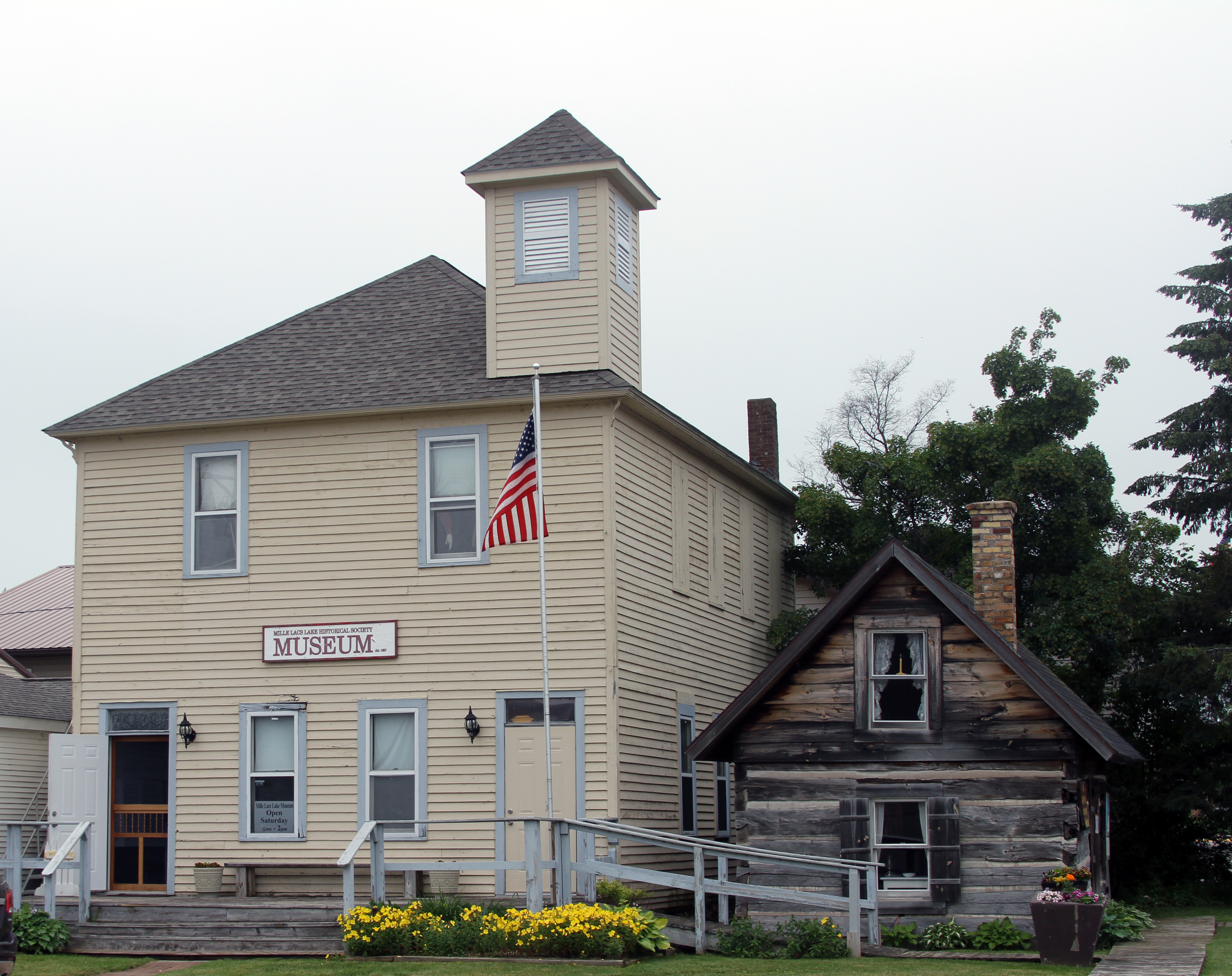
Mille Lacs Lake Historical Society Museum

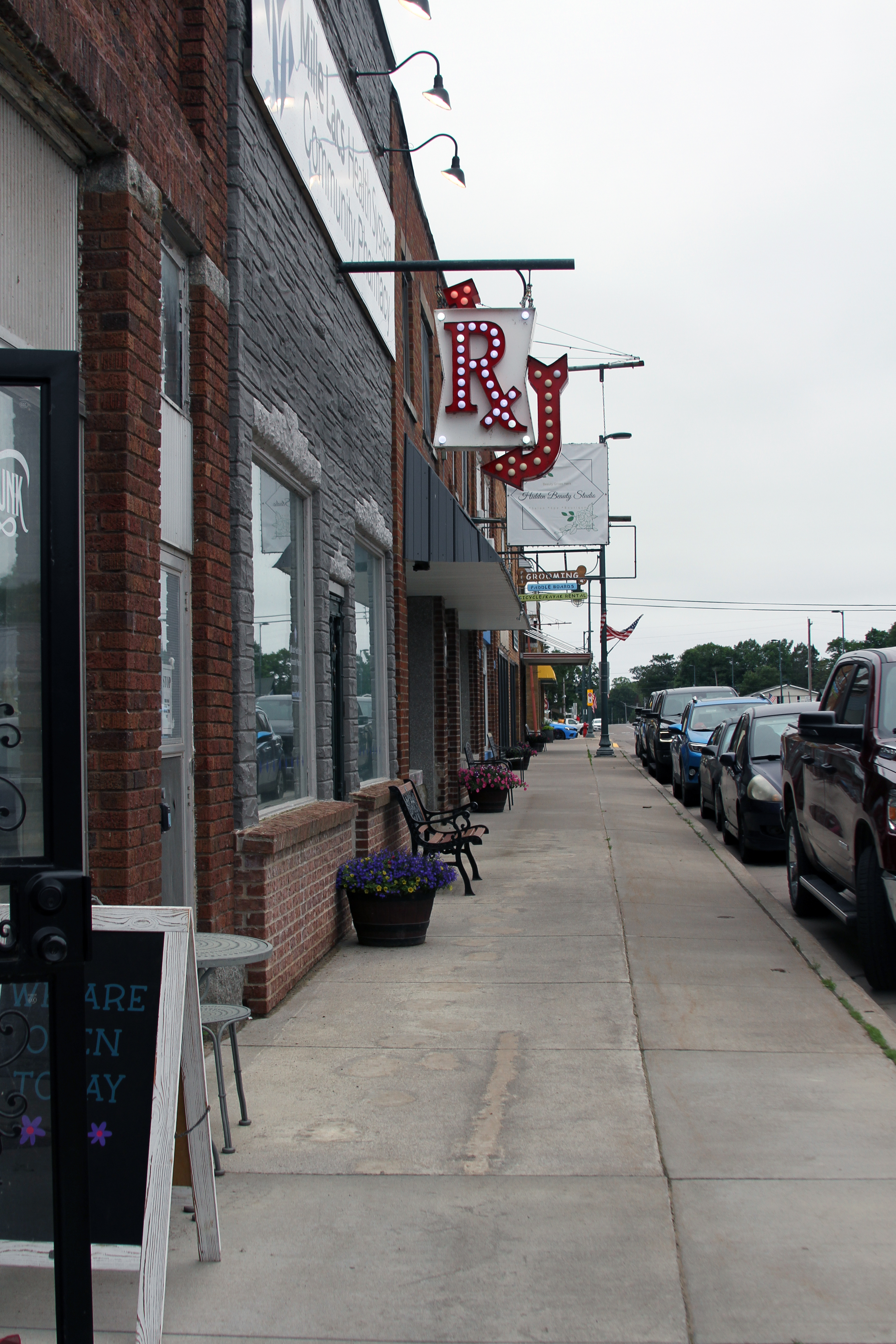
Sidewalk along businesses

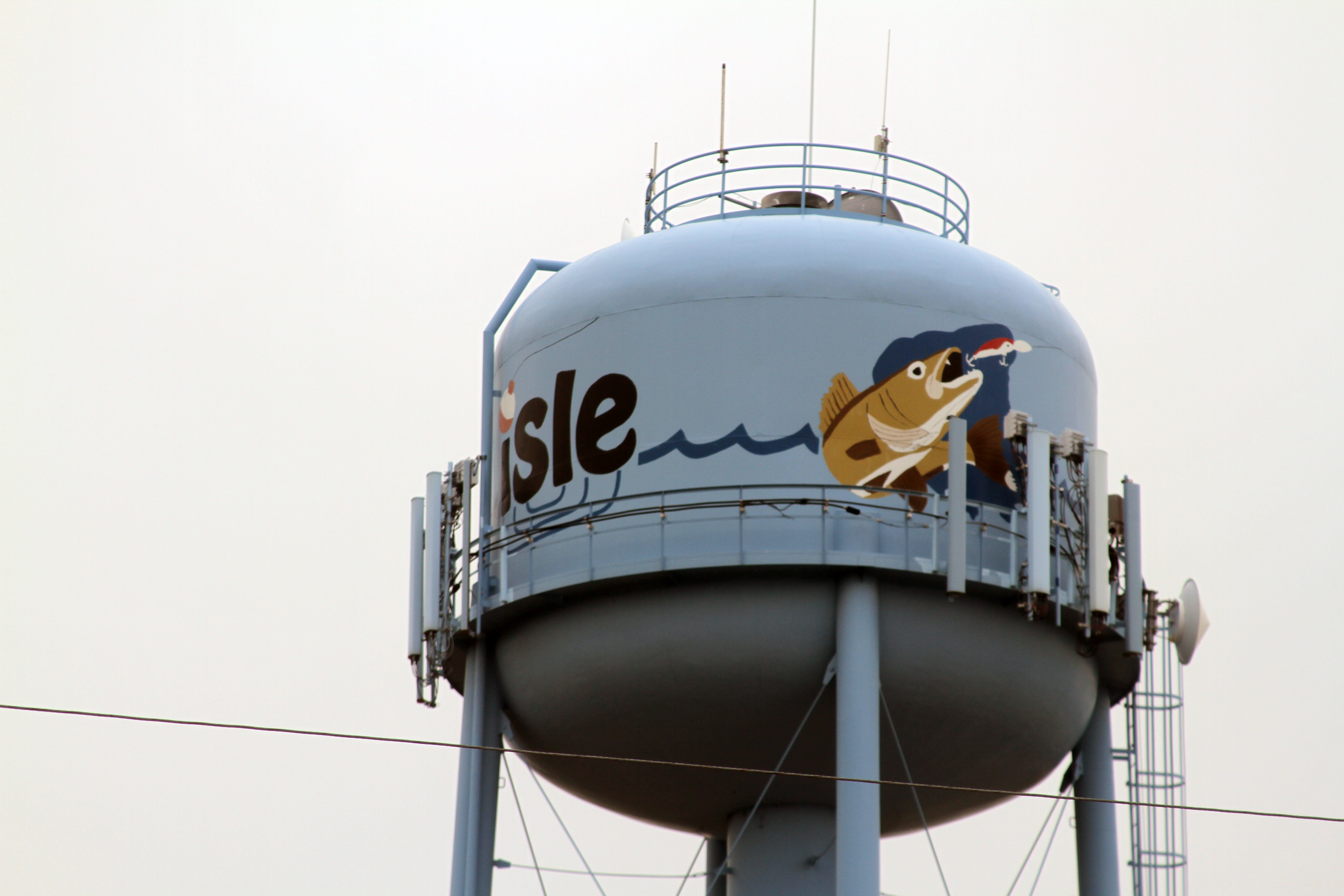
Water tower

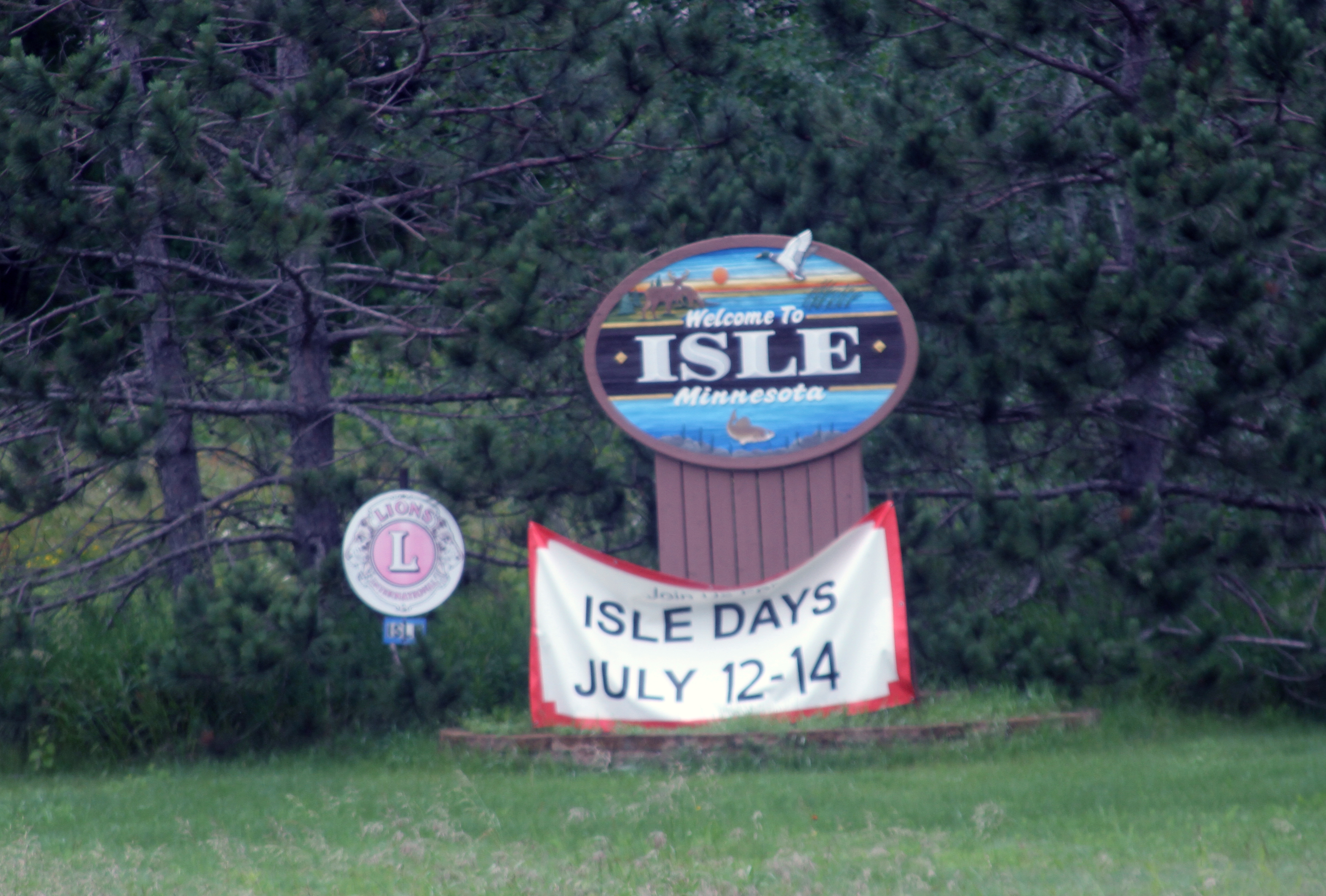
Sign at entrance to town

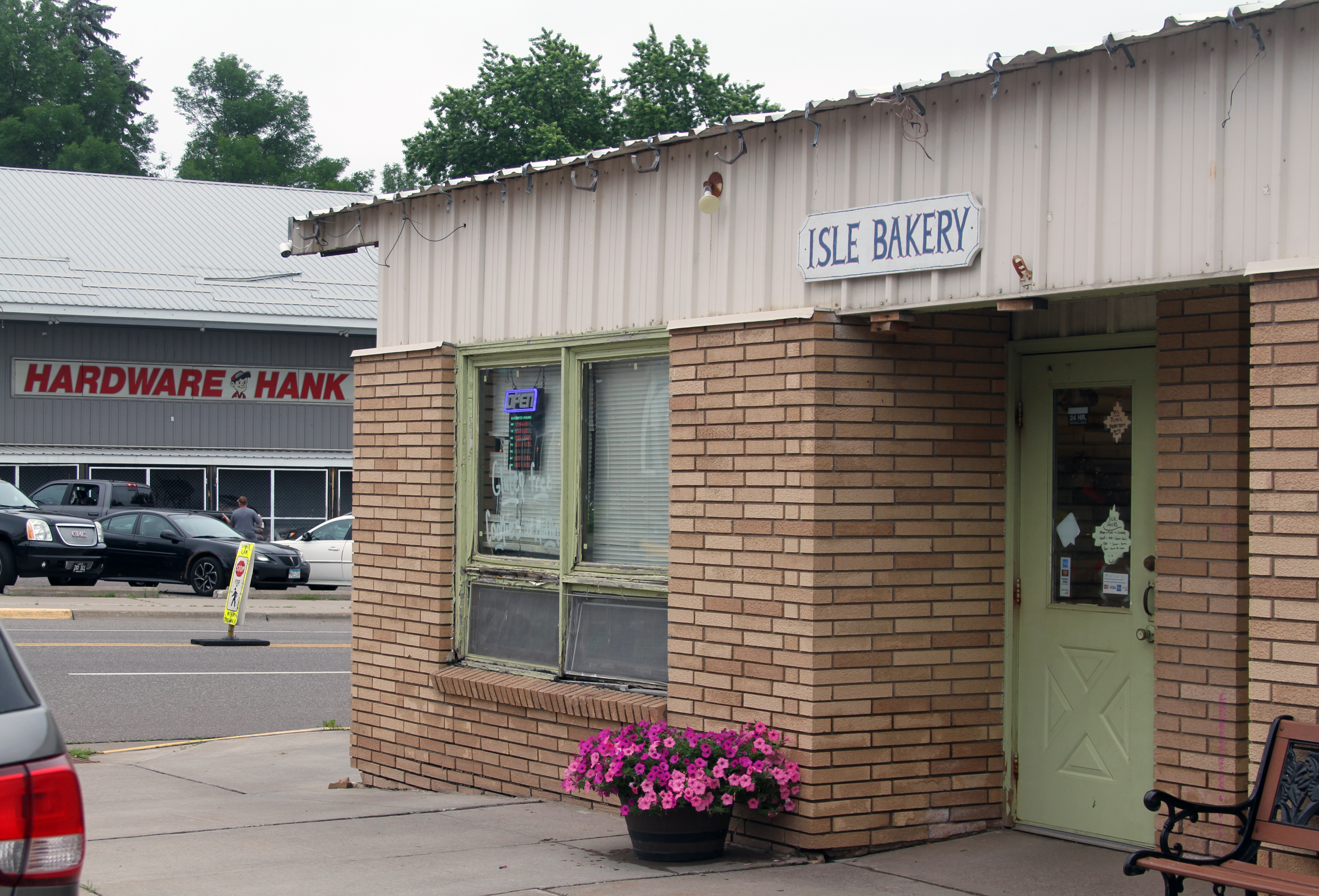
Bakery and hardware stores

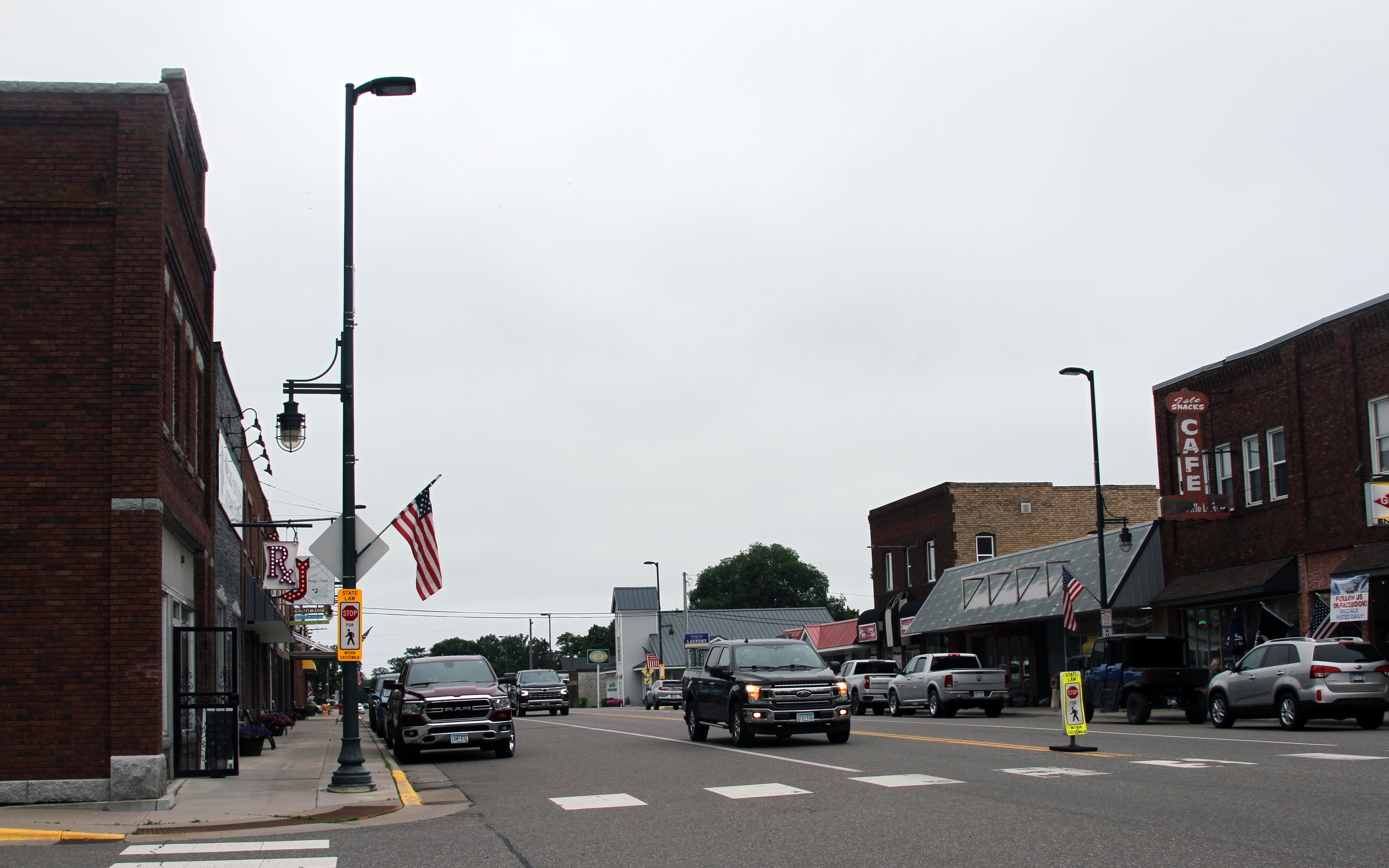
Business district

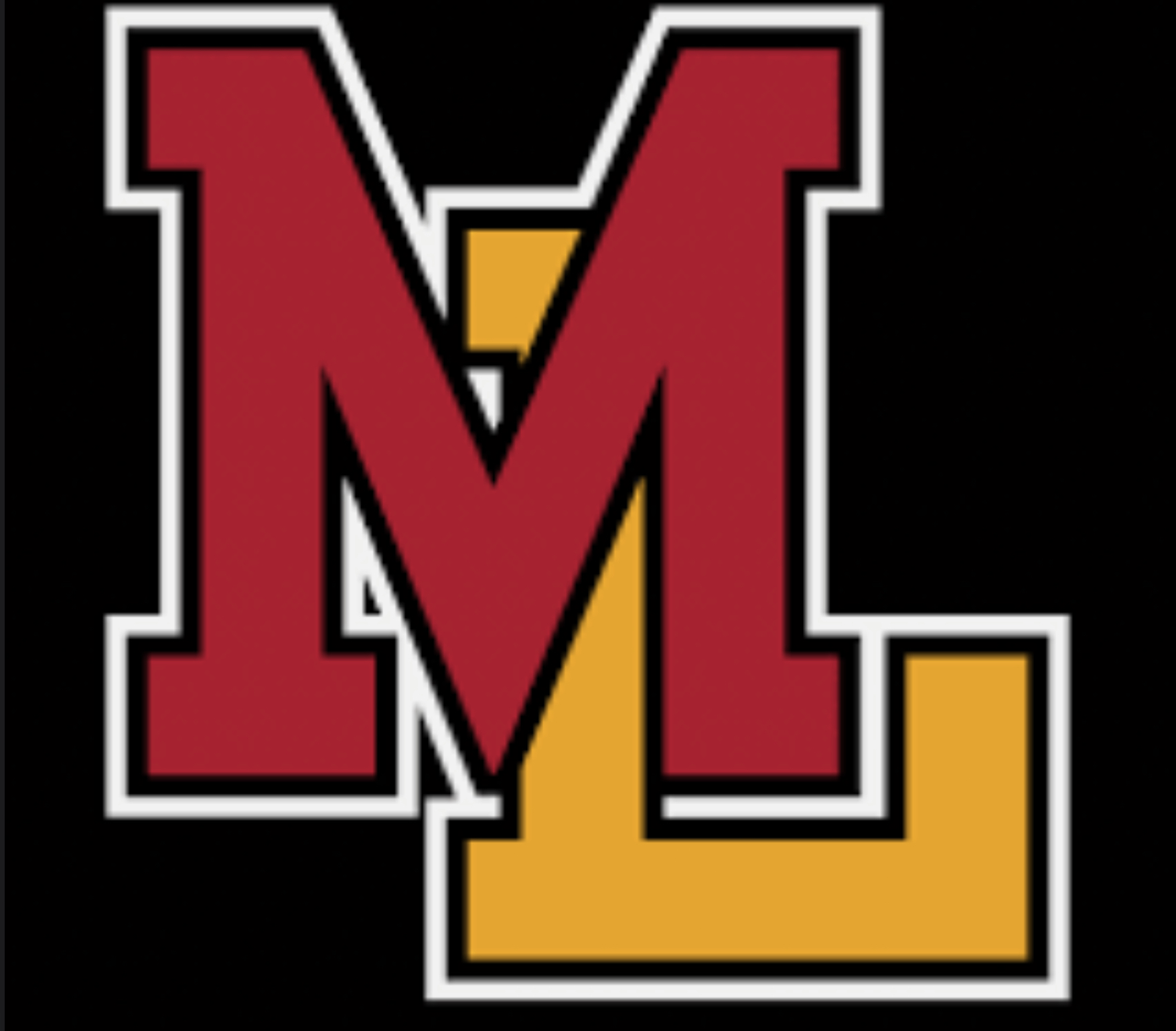
Mille Lacs Raiders after merging with Onamia School sports
