= Broadway Bridge (Little Falls) =

Little Falls Broadway Bridge
- Coordinates: 45°58′38″N 94°22′06″W
- Carries: MN 27 (Broadway Street)
- Crosses: Mississippi River

Characteristics
- Design: Girder bridge

The Little Falls Broadway Bridge is the only road bridge within the city limits of Little Falls, Minnesota. The bridge was built in 1941 and is the 3rd bridge to occupy the current spot. It is located less than one block north of the Little Falls Dam and connects the city's "east side" and "west side". Arguably, the major flaw of the bridge is that it lands before the railroad tracks on the west side, therefore traffic is blocked whenever a train goes through. Proposals for a bridge that would go over the tracks have been discussed.

== See also ==
- List of crossings of the Upper Mississippi River
