= Ogilvie Raceway =

Dirt clay oval near Ogilvie, Minnesota

"Your Saturday Night Home"
- Location: 1539 Highway 23, Kanabec Township, Kanabec County (near Ogilvie, Minnesota)
- Coordinates: 45.82875°N 93.39675°W
- Capacity: 3,500
- Owner: Wagamon family
- Broke ground: 2008
- Opened: 2009
- Major events: World of Outlaws Late Model Series

Oval
- Surface: Clay
- Length: 3/8 mi (0.60 km)
- Turns: 4

Ogilvie Raceway, is a high banked 3/8 mile Dirt clay oval race track located in Central Minnesota near Ogilvie, Minnesota. April - October weekly Wissota racing program consisting of Modifieds, Super Stocks, Midwest Modifieds, Modified 4sStreet Stocks and Hornets. Outdoor Go-Kart racing track was added in 2016. The track hosted the World of Outlaws Late Model Series in 2017 and 2018.

The track sits along the side of Highway 23.

== History ==
Ogilvie Raceway opened their inaugural season on May 29, 2009 under owners Corey Owens and Lucas Ostermann. On July 13, 2009 Ogilvie Raceway added Mod 4's to their weekly lineup. The season ended with their banquet on December 12, 2009.

The Wagamon family purchased the track in 2015. As of 2015, the track was running under WISSOTA sanction with Modifieds, Midwest Modifieds, Super Stocks, Street Stocks, Mod Fours, and Hornets.
