= McGregor, Minnesota =

City in Minnesota, United States

- City
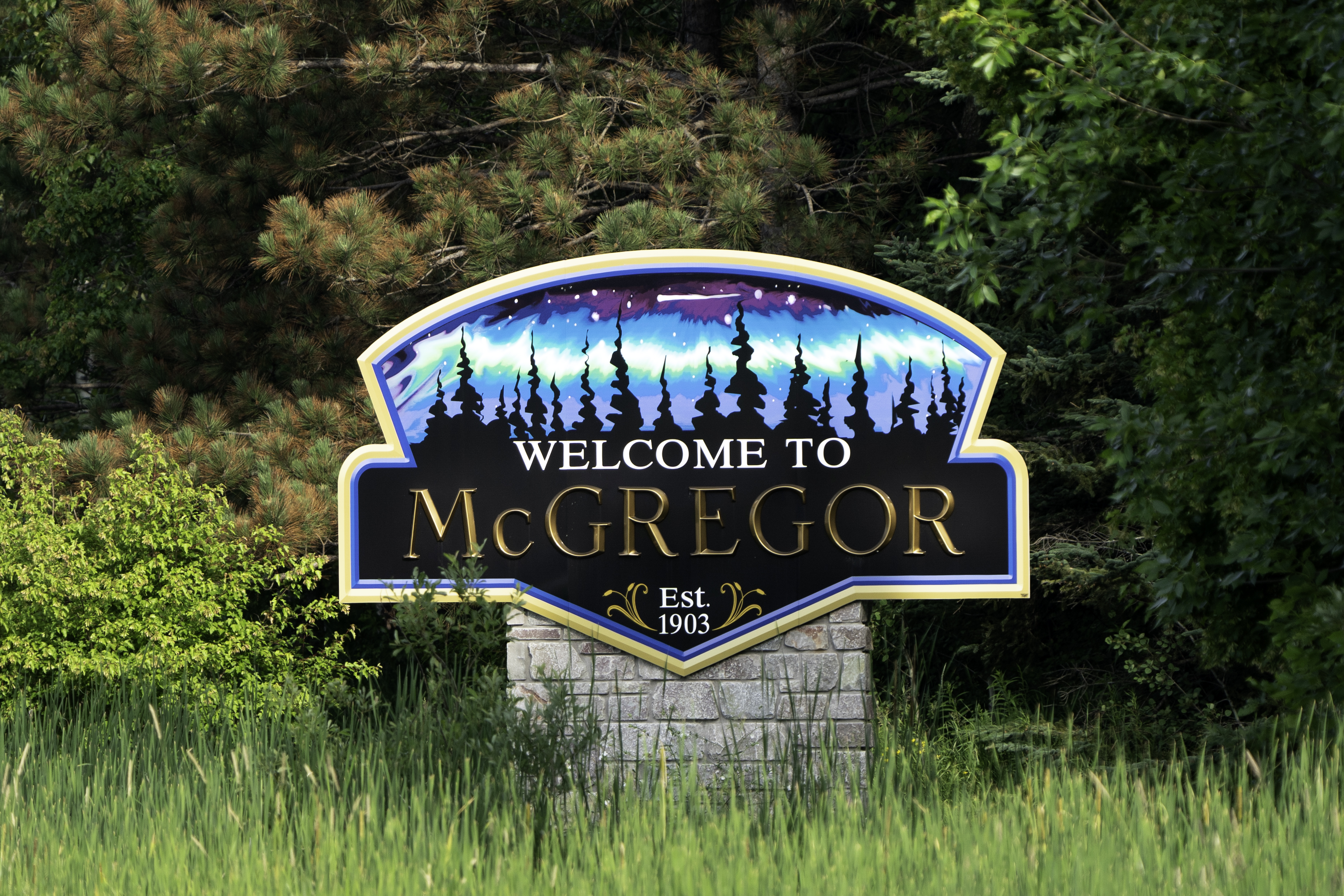

- Location of the city of McGregor within Aitkin County, Minnesota
- Coordinates: 46°36′31″N 93°18′20″W
- Country: United States
- State: Minnesota
- County: Aitkin
- Incorporated: August 27, 1903

Area
  - Total: 2.27 sq mi (5.87 km^{2})
  - Land: 2.14 sq mi (5.54 km^{2})
  - Water: 0.13 sq mi (0.33 km^{2})
- Elevation: 1,237 ft (377 m)

Population (2020)
  - Total: 384
  - Density: 179.5/sq mi (69.32/km^{2})
- Time zone: UTC-6 (Central (CST))
  - Summer (DST): UTC-5 (CDT)
- ZIP code: 55760
- Area code: 218
- FIPS code: 27-39014
- GNIS feature ID: 2395068

McGregor is a city in Aitkin County, Minnesota, United States. The population was 384 at the 2020 census. McGregor is along Minnesota State Highways 65 and 210. Other routes include Aitkin County Road 8 (Maddy Street).

== History ==
McGregor was incorporated in 1903, and separated from surrounding McGregor Township in 1919. It was named for either a hunter and trapper named McGregor who came from New York or for Major John G. MacGregor of Minneapolis. The post office opened in 1890.

== Geography ==
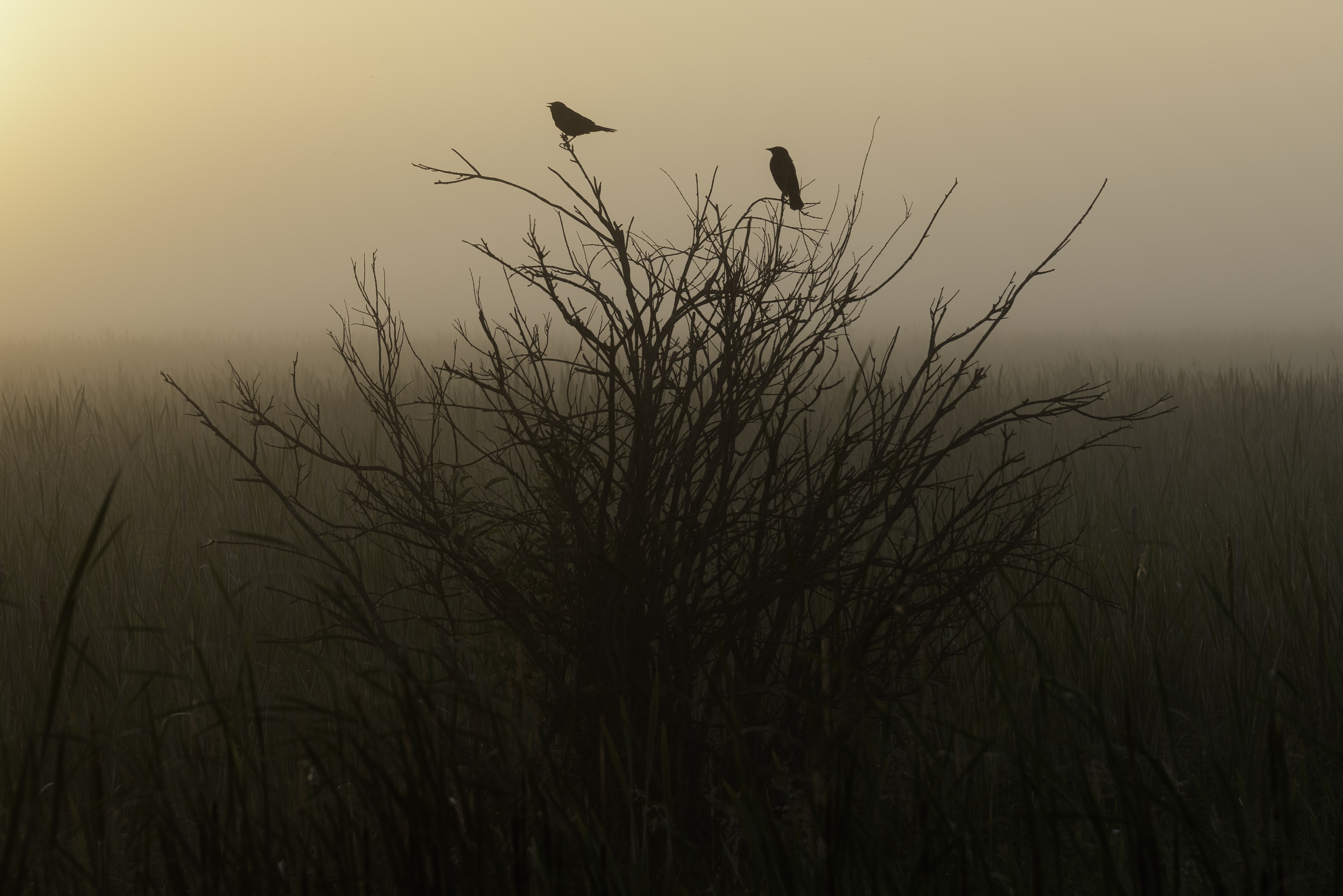
Red-winged blackbird silhouettes at McGregor Marsh

According to the United States Census Bureau, the city has an area of 2.11 square miles (5.46 km^{2}), of which 1.98 square miles (5.13 km^{2}) is land and 0.13 square miles (0.34 km^{2}) is water.

The Sandy River flows nearby. The Soo Line North ATV Trail is also nearby.

== Demographics ==
Historical population
Census	Pop.	Note	%±
1880	11		—
1910	126		—
1920	195		54.8%
1930	216		10.8%
1940	311		44.0%
1950	322		3.5%
1960	283		−12.1%
1970	331		17.0%
1980	447		35.0%
1990	376		−15.9%
2000	404		7.4%
2010	391		−3.2%
2020	384		−1.8%
U.S. Decennial Census

=== 2010 census ===
As of the census of 2010, there were 391 people, 180 households, and 99 families living in the city. The population density was 197.5 inhabitants per square mile (76.3/km^{2}). There were 207 housing units at an average density of 104.5 per square mile (40.3/km^{2}). The racial makeup of the city was 95.1% White, 0.3% African American, 4.1% Native American, 0.3% from other races, and 0.3% from two or more races. Hispanic or Latino of any race were 0.5% of the population.

There were 180 households, of which 27.8% had children under the age of 18 living with them, 34.4% were married couples living together, 13.9% had a female householder with no husband present, 6.7% had a male householder with no wife present, and 45.0% were non-families. 41.7% of all households were made up of individuals, and 21.1% had someone living alone who was 65 years of age or older. The average household size was 2.17 and the average family size was 2.91.

The median age in the city was 43.3 years. 23% of residents were under the age of 18; 7.8% were between the ages of 18 and 24; 23% were from 25 to 44; 23.4% were from 45 to 64; and 22.8% were 65 years of age or older. The gender makeup of the city was 46.5% male and 53.5% female.

=== 2000 census ===
As of the census of 2000, there were 404 people, 182 households, and 105 families living in the city. The population density was 205.5 inhabitants per square mile (79.3/km^{2}). There were 199 housing units at an average density of 101.2 per square mile (39.1/km^{2}). The racial makeup of the city was 95.54% White, 0.50% African American, 3.22% Native American, 0.50% from other races, and 0.25% from two or more races. Hispanic or Latino of any race were 0.50% of the population. 30.1% were of German, 17.0% Finnish, 16.7% Norwegian, 5.9% Swedish and 5.2% American ancestry according to Census 2000.

There were 182 households, out of which 27.5% had children under the age of 18 living with them, 39.6% were married couples living together, 14.3% had a female householder with no husband present, and 41.8% were non-families. 39.6% of all households were made up of individuals, and 22.0% had someone living alone who was 65 years of age or older. The average household size was 2.22 and the average family size was 2.93.

In the city, the population was spread out, with 26.7% under the age of 18, 9.9% from 18 to 24, 20.8% from 25 to 44, 21.5% from 45 to 64, and 21.0% who were 65 years of age or older. The median age was 38 years. For every 100 females, there were 83.6 males. For every 100 females age 18 and over, there were 83.9 males.

The median income for a household in the city was $24,318, and the median income for a family was $30,625. Males had a median income of $27,125 versus $16,607 for females. The per capita income for the city was $13,167. About 6.8% of families and 13.7% of the population were below the poverty line, including 8.8% of those under age 18 and 17.3% of those age 65 or over.

== Gallery ==
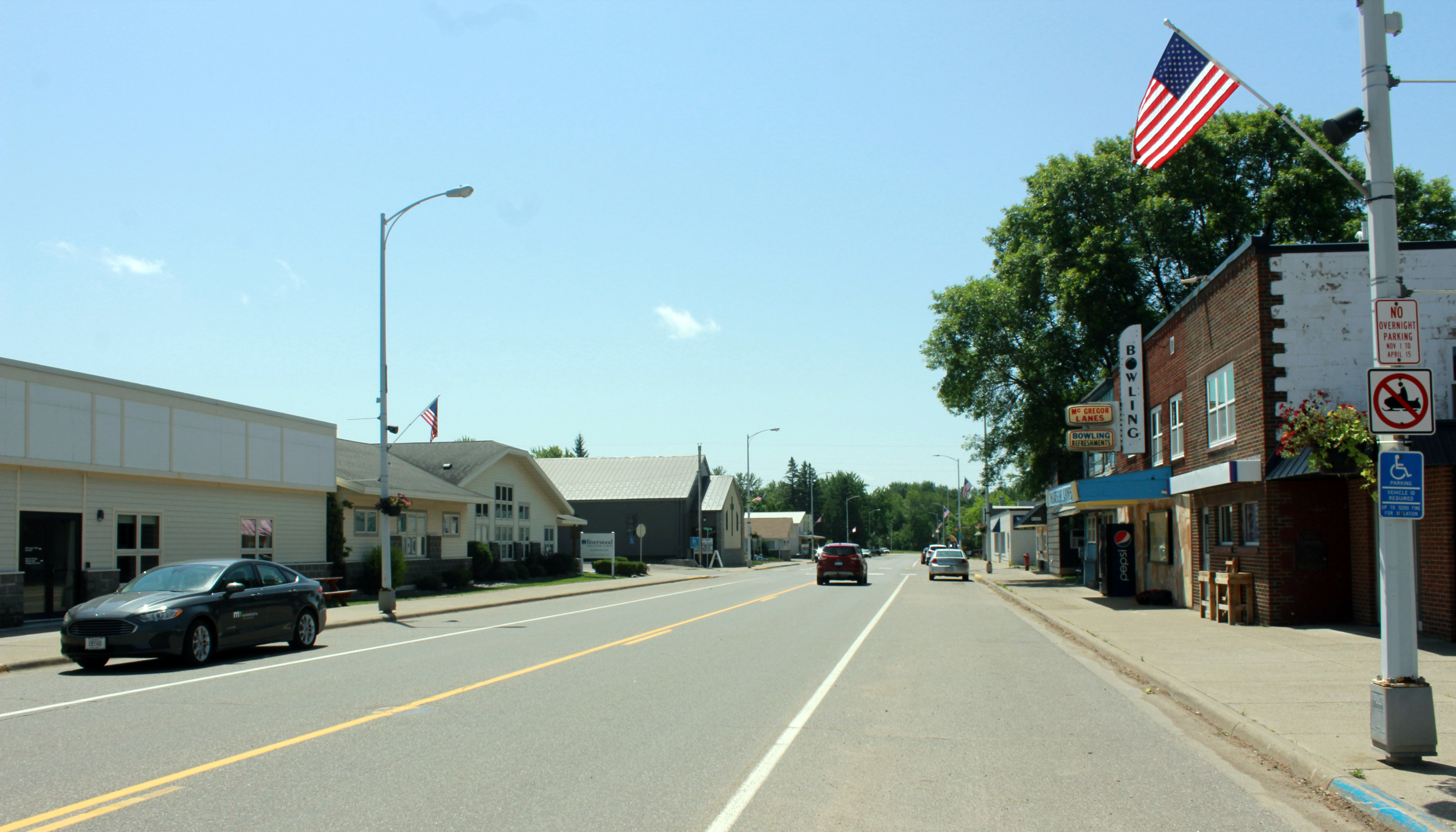
Businesses on Maddy Street

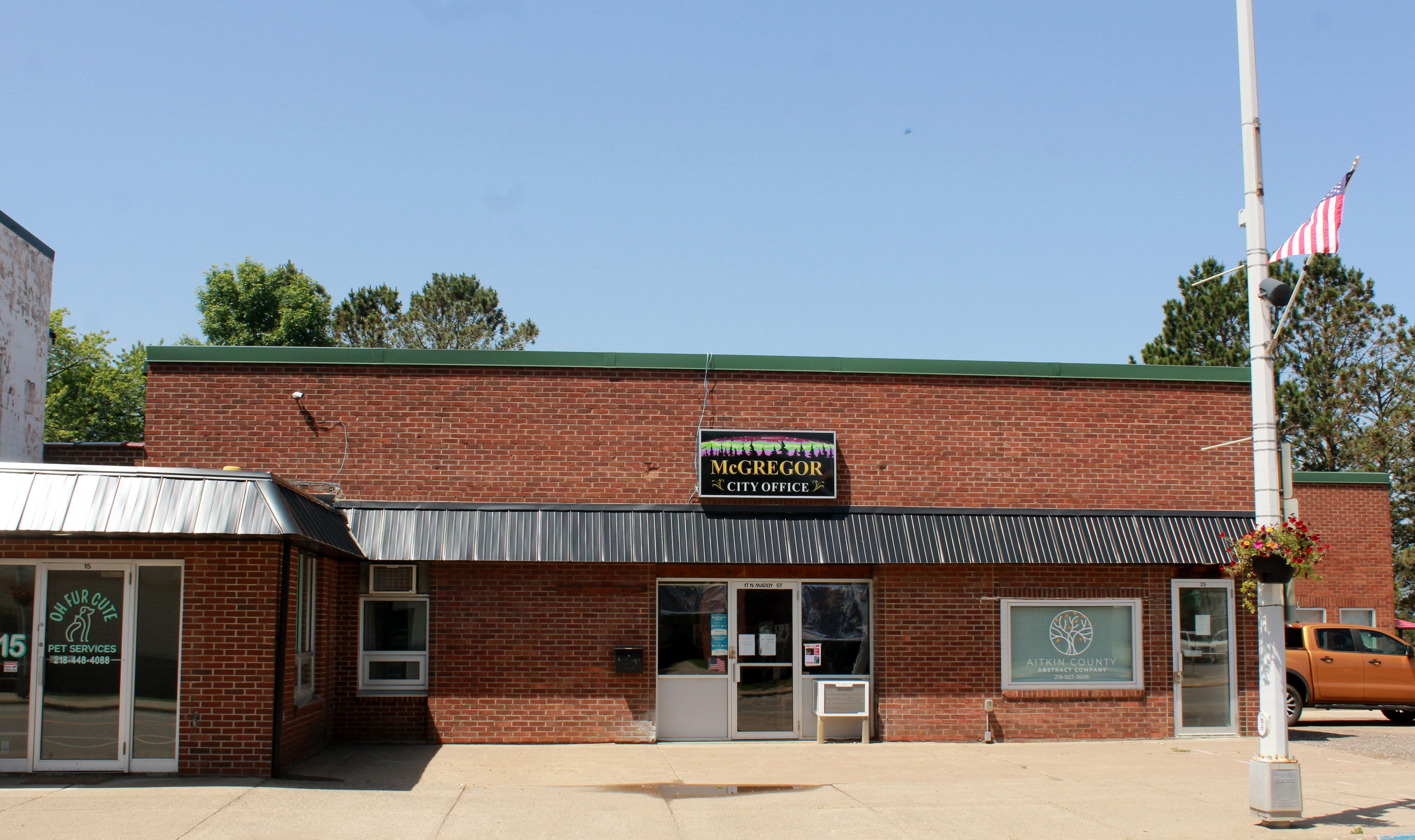
City Hall

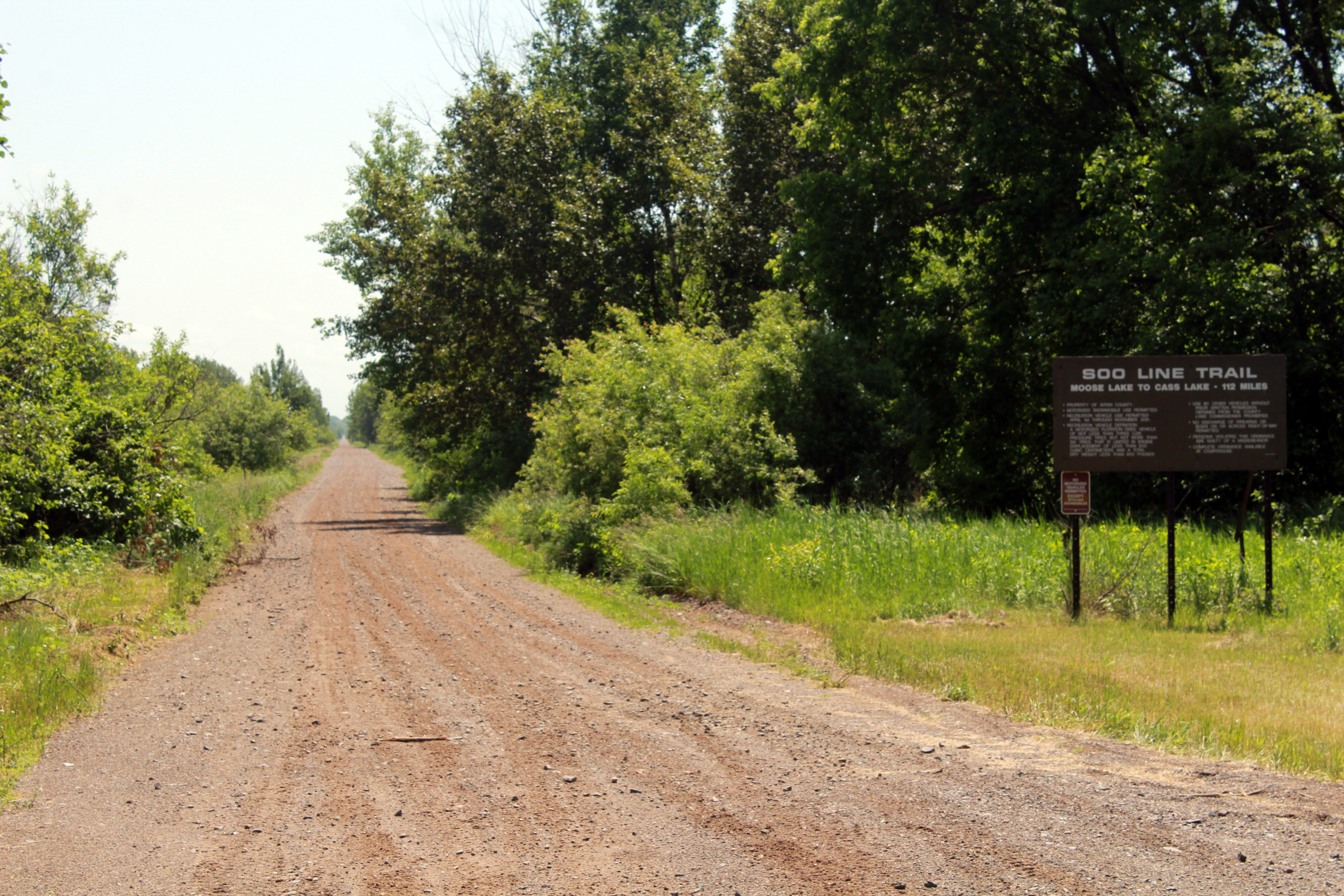
SOO Line Trail

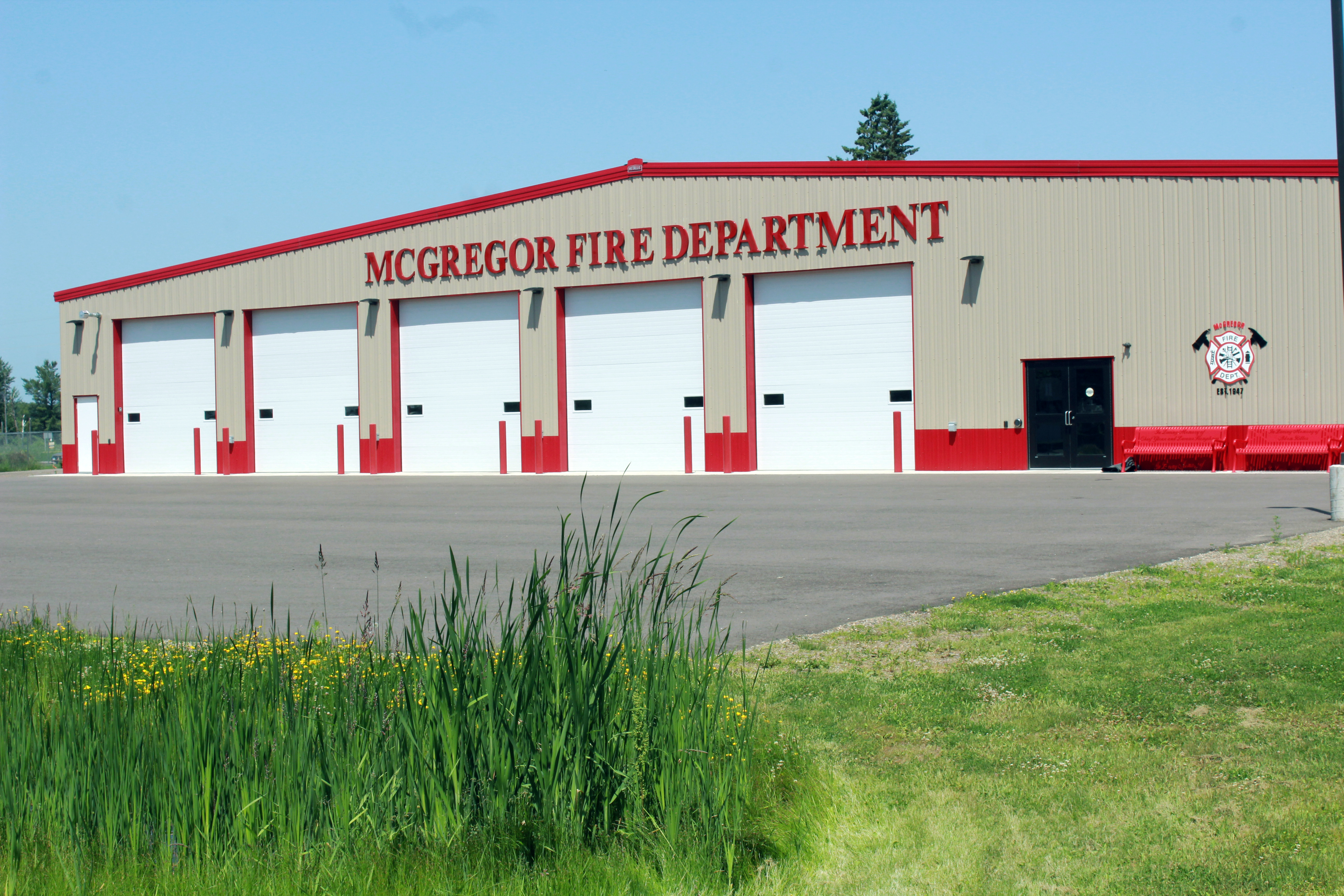
Fire Station

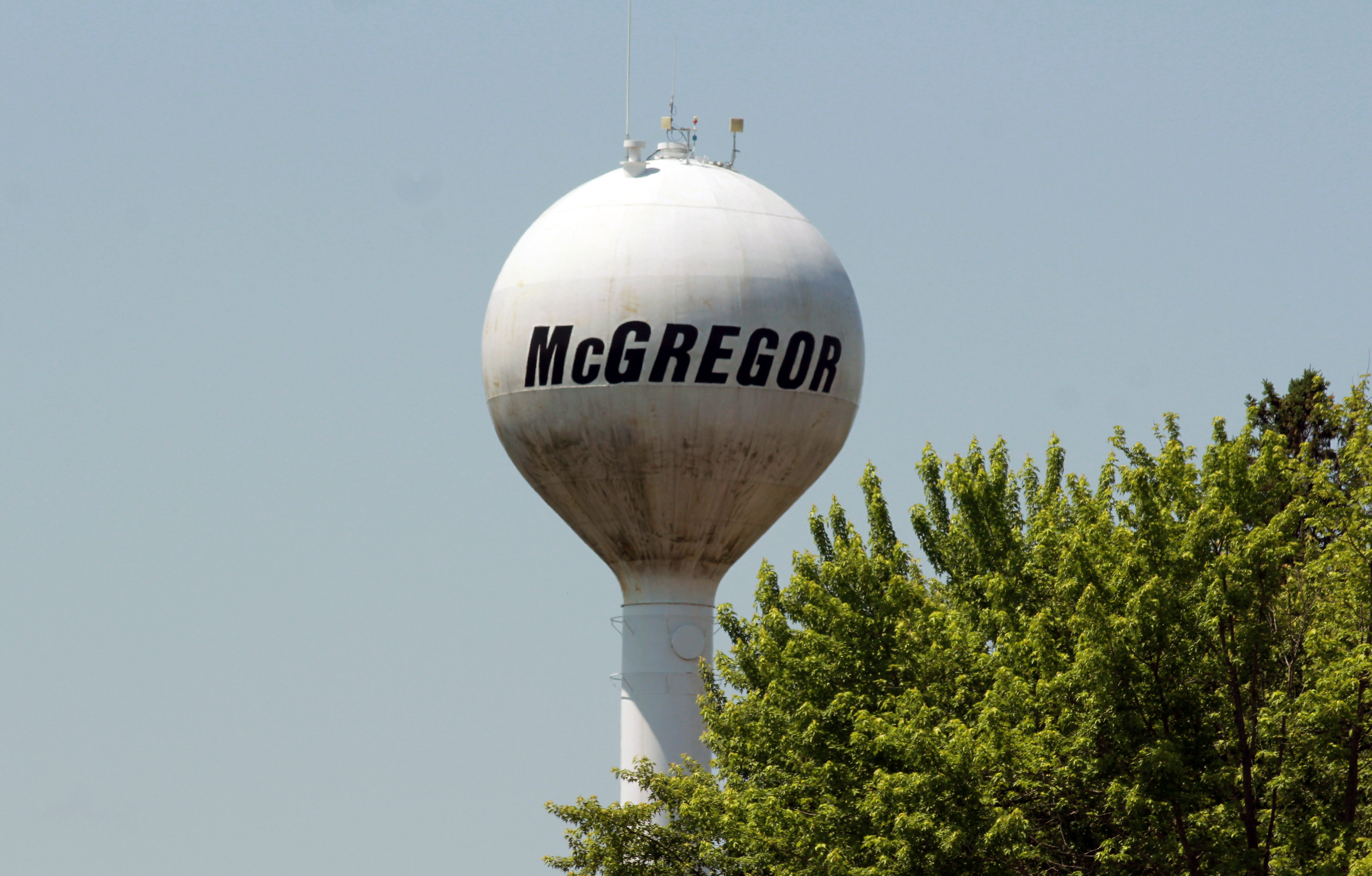
Water tower

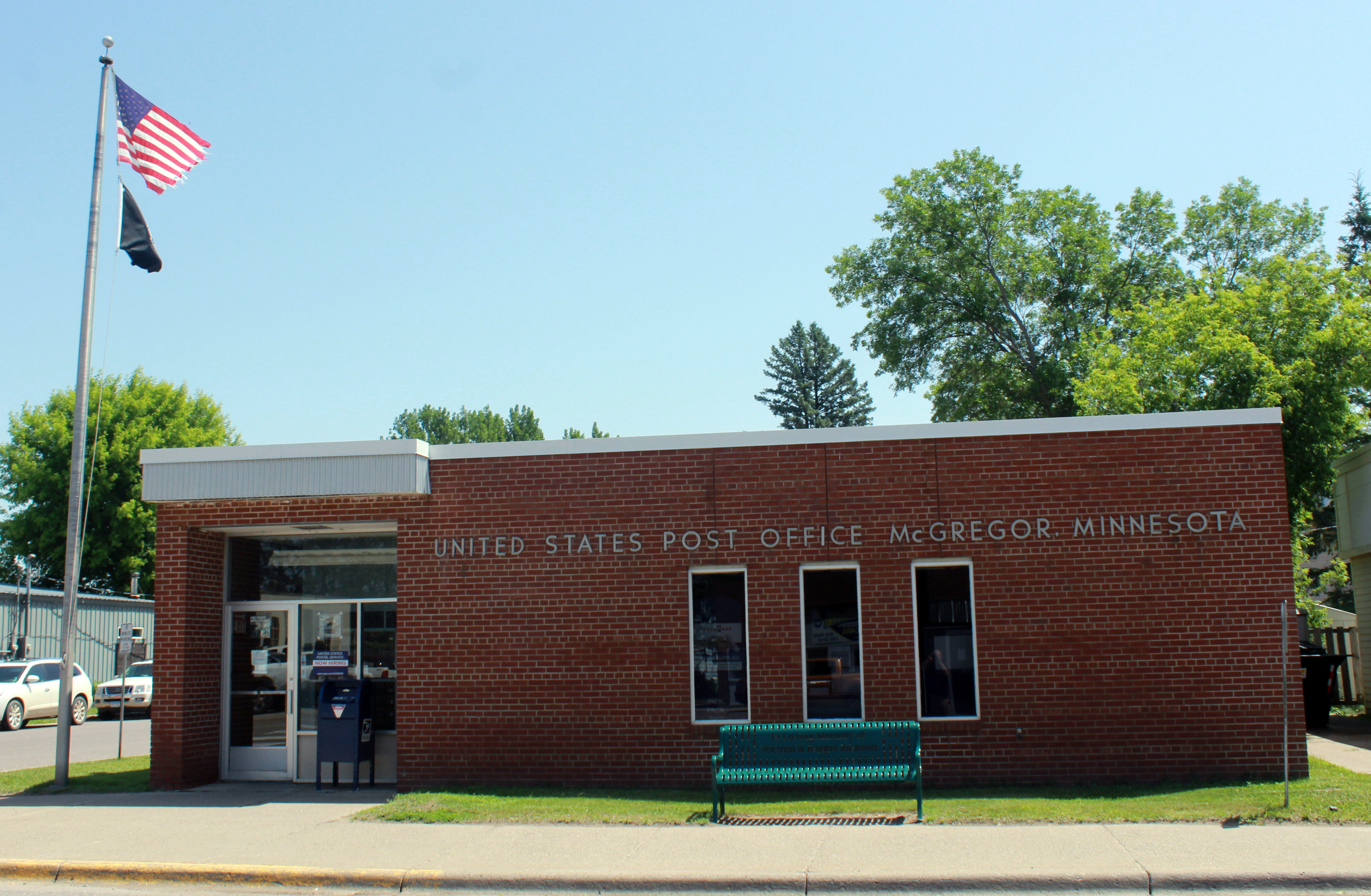
Post Office

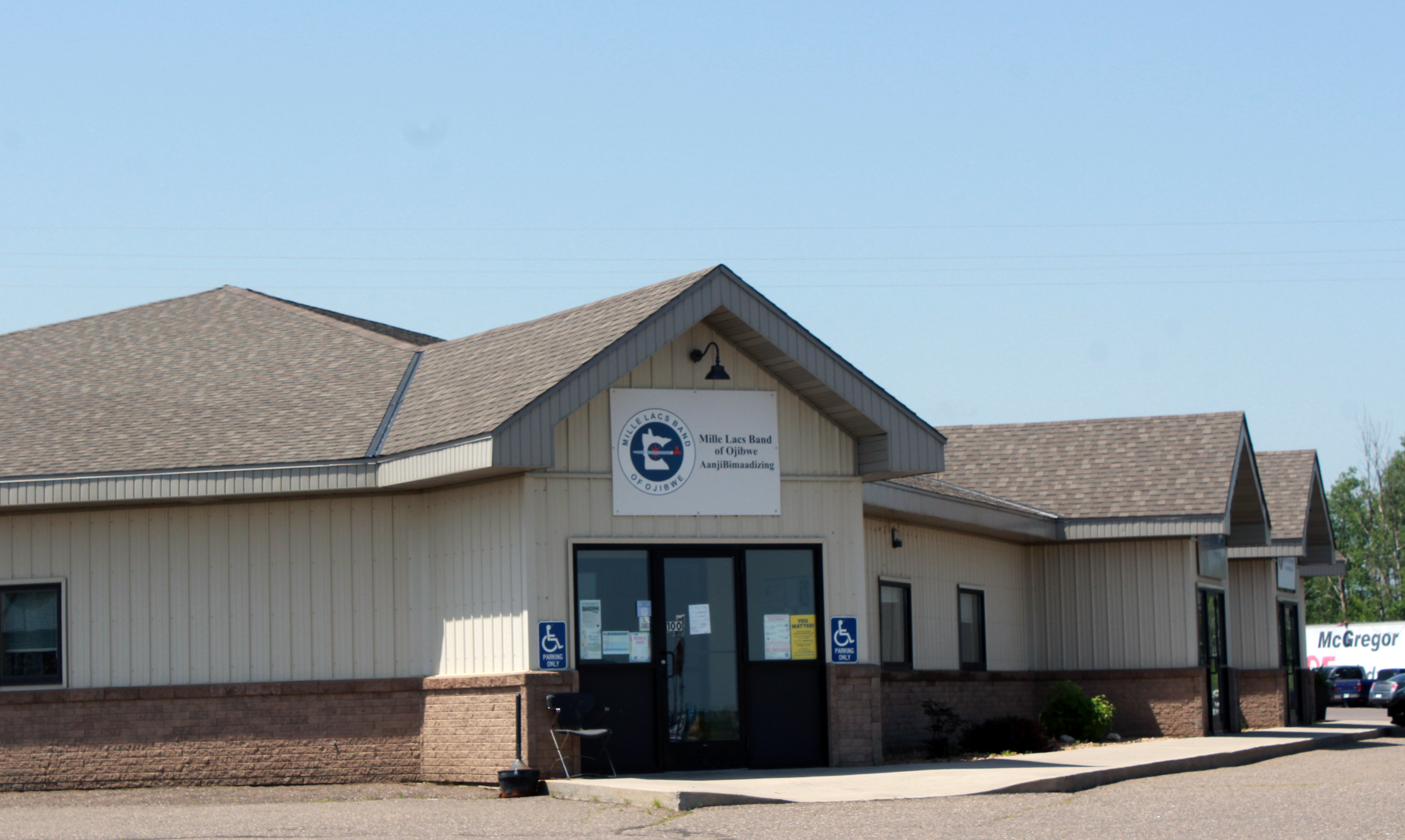
Mille Lacs Band of Ojibwe Aanjibimaadizing office
