= Ford Township, Kanabec County, Minnesota =

Ford Township, Minnesota
- Township
- Location within Minnesota and the United States Fort Township (the United States)
- Coordinates: 46°7′11″N 93°13′59″W
- Country: United States
- State: Minnesota
- County: Kanabec
- Organized: May 16, 1916

Area
  - Total: 36.3 sq mi (94.0 km^{2})
  - Land: 36.2 sq mi (93.7 km^{2})
  - Water: 0.077 sq mi (0.2 km^{2})
- Elevation: 1,184 ft (361 m)

Population (2000)
  - Total: 177
  - Density: 4.9/sq mi (1.9/km^{2})
- Time zone: UTC-6 (Central (CST))
  - Summer (DST): UTC-5 (CDT)
- FIPS code: 27-21644
- GNIS feature ID: 0664189
- Website: http://www.fordtownship.org/

Ford Township is a township in Kanabec County, Minnesota, United States. Organized as a township on May 16, 1916, the population was 177 at the 2000 census.

Ford Township was organized in 1916, and named for industrialist Henry Ford.

== Geography ==
According to the United States Census Bureau, the township has a total area of 36.3 square miles (94 km^{2}), of which 36.2 square miles (94 km^{2}) is land and 0.1 square miles (0.26 km^{2}) (0.28%) is water.

== Demographics ==
As of the census of 2000, there were 177 people, 71 households, and 49 families residing in the township. The population density was 4.9 inhabitants per square mile (1.9/km^{2}). There were 123 housing units at an average density of 3.4 per square mile (1.3/km^{2}). The racial makeup of the township was 97.18% White, 0.56% Asian, and 2.26% from two or more races.

There were 71 households, out of which 32.4% had children under the age of 18 living with them, 56.3% were married couples living together, 5.6% had a female householder with no husband present, and 29.6% were non-families. 26.8% of all households were made up of individuals, and 8.5% had someone living alone who was 65 years of age or older. The average household size was 2.49 and the average family size was 2.98.

In the township the population was spread out, with 27.1% under the age of 18, 6.8% from 18 to 24, 28.2% from 25 to 44, 25.4% from 45 to 64, and 12.4% who were 65 years of age or older. The median age was 38 years. For every 100 females, there were 110.7 males. For every 100 females age 18 and over, there were 108.1 males.

The median income for a household in the township was $38,125, and the median income for a family was $50,625. Males had a median income of $38,750 versus $23,750 for females. The per capita income for the township was $17,102. About 8.5% of families and 15.6% of the population were below the poverty line, including 18.4% of those under the age of eighteen and 16.7% of those 65 or over.
