= Ogilvie, Minnesota =

City in Minnesota, United States

Ogilvie
- City
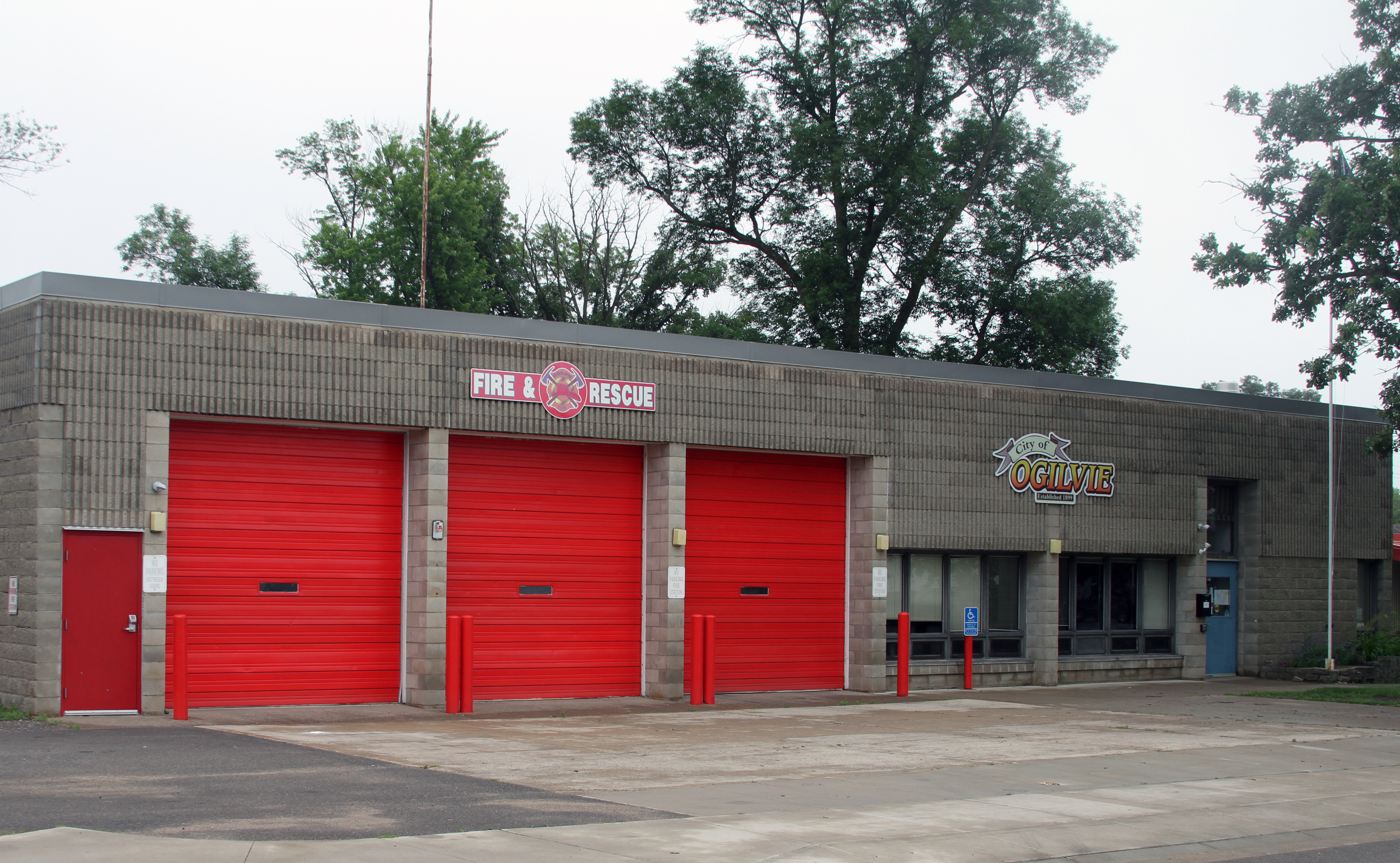
- City Hall
- Motto: "We Are The Lions"
- Location of Ogilvie, Minnesota
- Coordinates: 45°49′48″N 93°25′24″W
- Country: United States
- State: Minnesota
- County: Kanabec

Area
  - Total: 0.89 sq mi (2.31 km^{2})
  - Land: 0.89 sq mi (2.30 km^{2})
  - Water: 0 sq mi (0.00 km^{2})
- Elevation: 1,037 ft (316 m)

Population (2020)
  - Total: 388
  - Density: 436.0/sq mi (168.34/km^{2})
- Time zone: UTC-6 (Central (CST))
  - Summer (DST): UTC-5 (CDT)
- ZIP code: 56358
- Area code: 320
- FIPS code: 27-48166
- GNIS feature ID: 2395309

Ogilvie is a city in Kanabec County, Minnesota, United States. The population was 388 at the 2020 census.

== Geography ==
According to the United States Census Bureau, the city has a total area of 0.93 square miles (2.41 km^{2}), all land.

The Groundhouse River flows nearby.

== Transportation ==
=== Major routes ===
The following roads serve as major routes through the community of Ogilvie.

- Minnesota State Highway 23
- Minnesota State Highway 47
- Kanabec County Road 10

== Demographics ==
Historical population
Census	Pop.	Note	%±
1910	270		—
1920	436		61.5%
1930	344		−21.1%
1940	438		27.3%
1950	362		−17.4%
1960	376		3.9%
1970	384		2.1%
1980	423		10.2%
1990	510		20.6%
2000	474		−7.1%
2010	369		−22.2%
2020	388		5.1%
U.S. Decennial Census

=== 2010 census ===
As of the census of 2010, there were 369 people, 160 households, and 91 families residing in the city. The population density was 396.8 inhabitants per square mile (153.2/km^{2}). There were 186 housing units at an average density of 200.0 per square mile (77.2/km^{2}). The racial makeup of the city was 98.9% White, 0.3% Native American, and 0.8% from two or more races. Hispanic or Latino of any race were 0.3% of the population.

There were 160 households, of which 27.5% had children under the age of 18 living with them, 33.8% were married couples living together, 16.9% had a female householder with no husband present, 6.3% had a male householder with no wife present, and 43.1% were non-families. 30.6% of all households were made up of individuals, and 16.9% had someone living alone who was 65 years of age or older. The average household size was 2.31 and the average family size was 2.89.

The median age in the city was 41.3 years. 24.4% of residents were under the age of 18; 6.1% were between the ages of 18 and 24; 22.3% were from 25 to 44; 28.4% were from 45 to 64; and 18.7% were 65 years of age or older. The gender makeup of the city was 49.6% male and 50.4% female.

=== 2000 census ===
As of the census of 2000, there were 474 people, 182 households, and 111 families residing in the city. The population density was 507.0 inhabitants per square mile (195.8/km^{2}). There were 199 housing units at an average density of 212.9 per square mile (82.2/km^{2}). The racial makeup of the city was 93.88% White, 0.42% African American, 2.11% Native American, 2.74% Asian, 0.21% from other races, and 0.63% from two or more races. Hispanic or Latino of any race were 0.63% of the population.

There were 182 households, out of which 39.0% had children under the age of 18 living with them, 37.9% were married couples living together, 15.9% had a female householder with no husband present, and 38.5% were non-families. 30.2% of all households were made up of individuals, and 13.2% had someone living alone who was 65 years of age or older. The average household size was 2.60 and the average family size was 3.13.

In the city, the population was spread out, with 32.3% under the age of 18, 8.0% from 18 to 24, 27.8% from 25 to 44, 19.4% from 45 to 64, and 12.4% who were 65 years of age or older. The median age was 32 years. For every 100 females, there were 89.6 males. For every 100 females age 18 and over, there were 86.6 males.

The median income in 2000 for a household in the city was $27,292, and the median income for a family was $33,125. Males had a median income of $22,083 versus $21,250 for females. The per capita income for the city was $15,198. About 8.8% of families and 14.6% of the population were below the poverty line, including 20.0% of those under age 18 and 6.7% of those age 65 or over.

== History ==
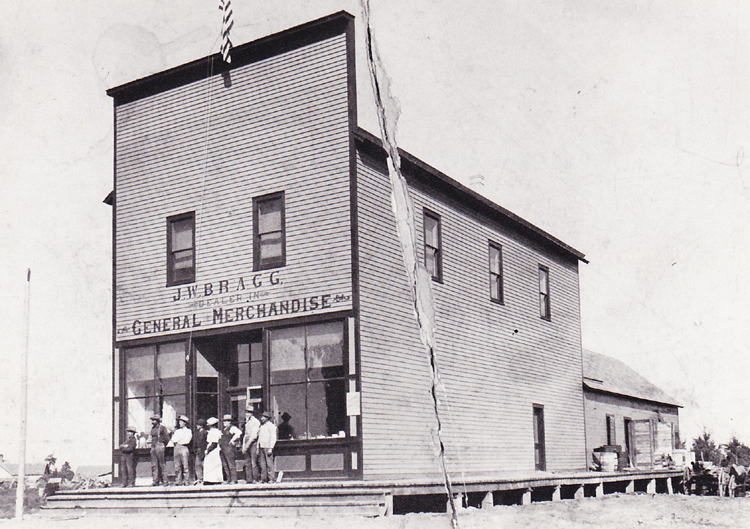
Ogilvie general store circa 1900

A post office called Ogilvie has been in operation since 1899. The city was named for Oric Ogilvie Whited, a local landowner.

In July 2023, the Minnesota Department of Transportation misspelled the town name signs to "Oglivie" on newly installed signs along state highways to update the population from the 2020 Census. Residents noted that the spelling was commonly mistaken. The signs were replaced within a week.

== Today ==
The Ogilvie Raceway, a 3/8 mile Dirt clay oval race track, opened on May 29, 2009.

The sports teams at Ogilvie High School are known as the Ogilvie Lions.

== Notable person ==
- Clayton Tonnemaker (1928–1996), American football player

== Gallery ==
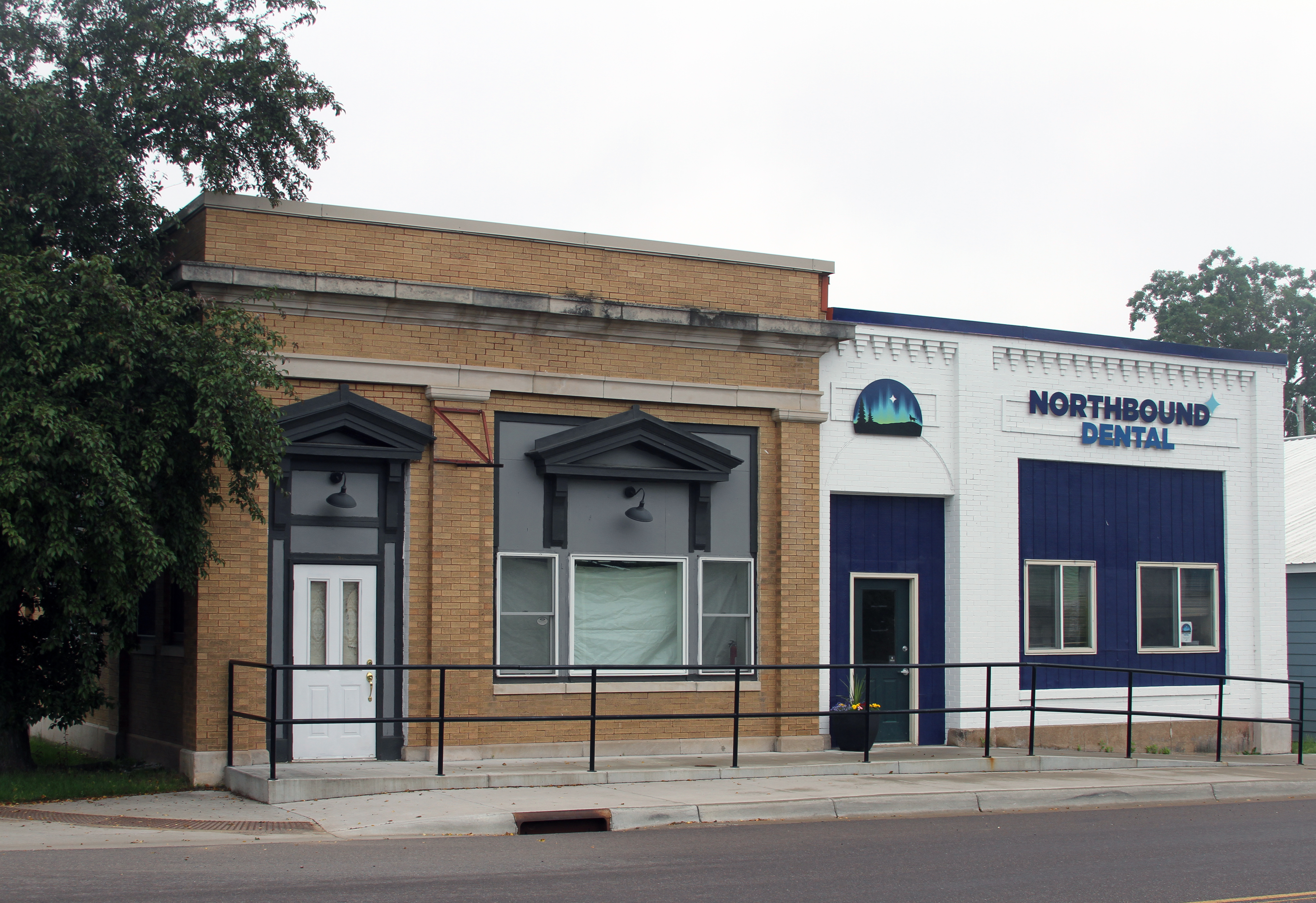
Buildings on main street

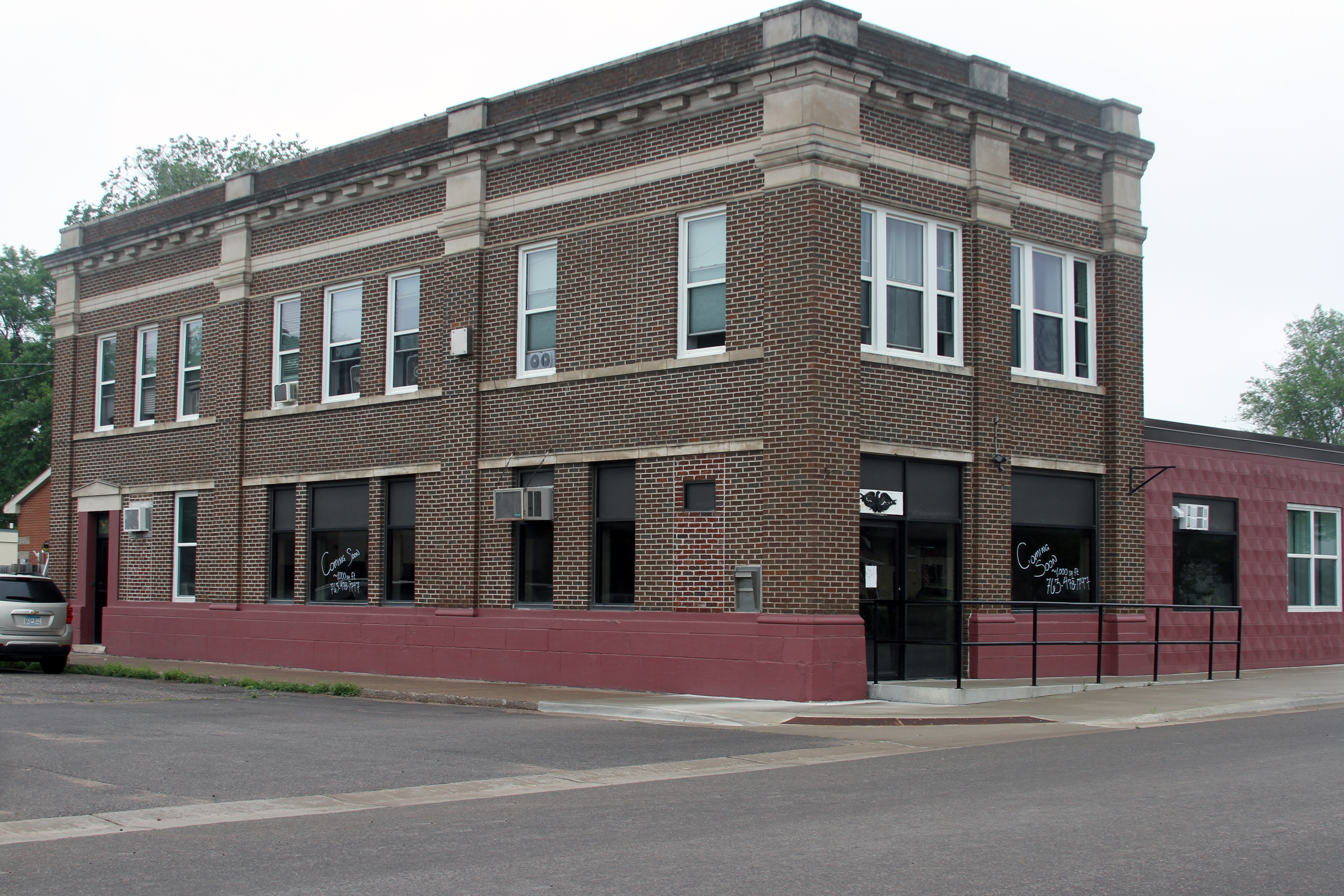
Building on main street

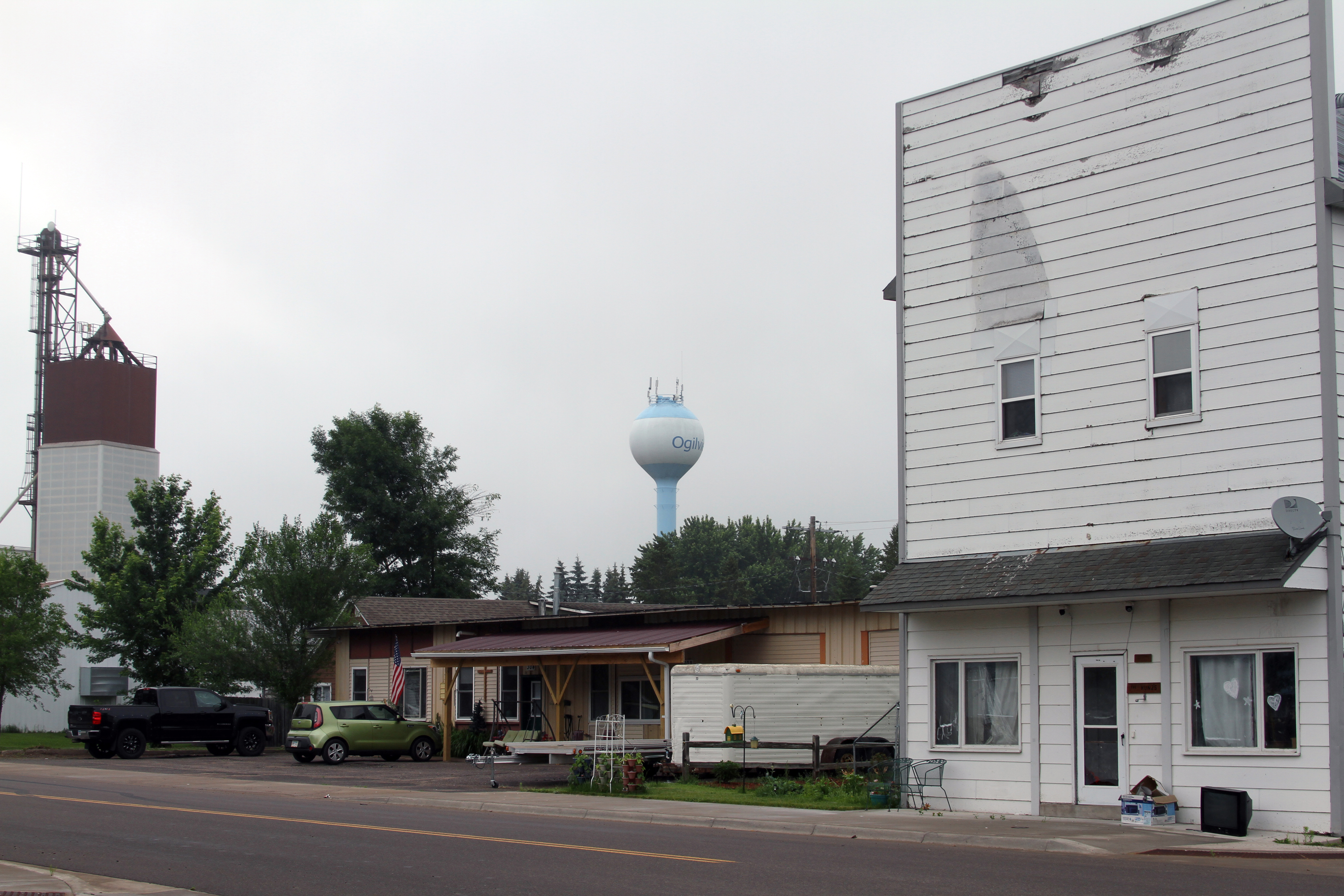
Water tower

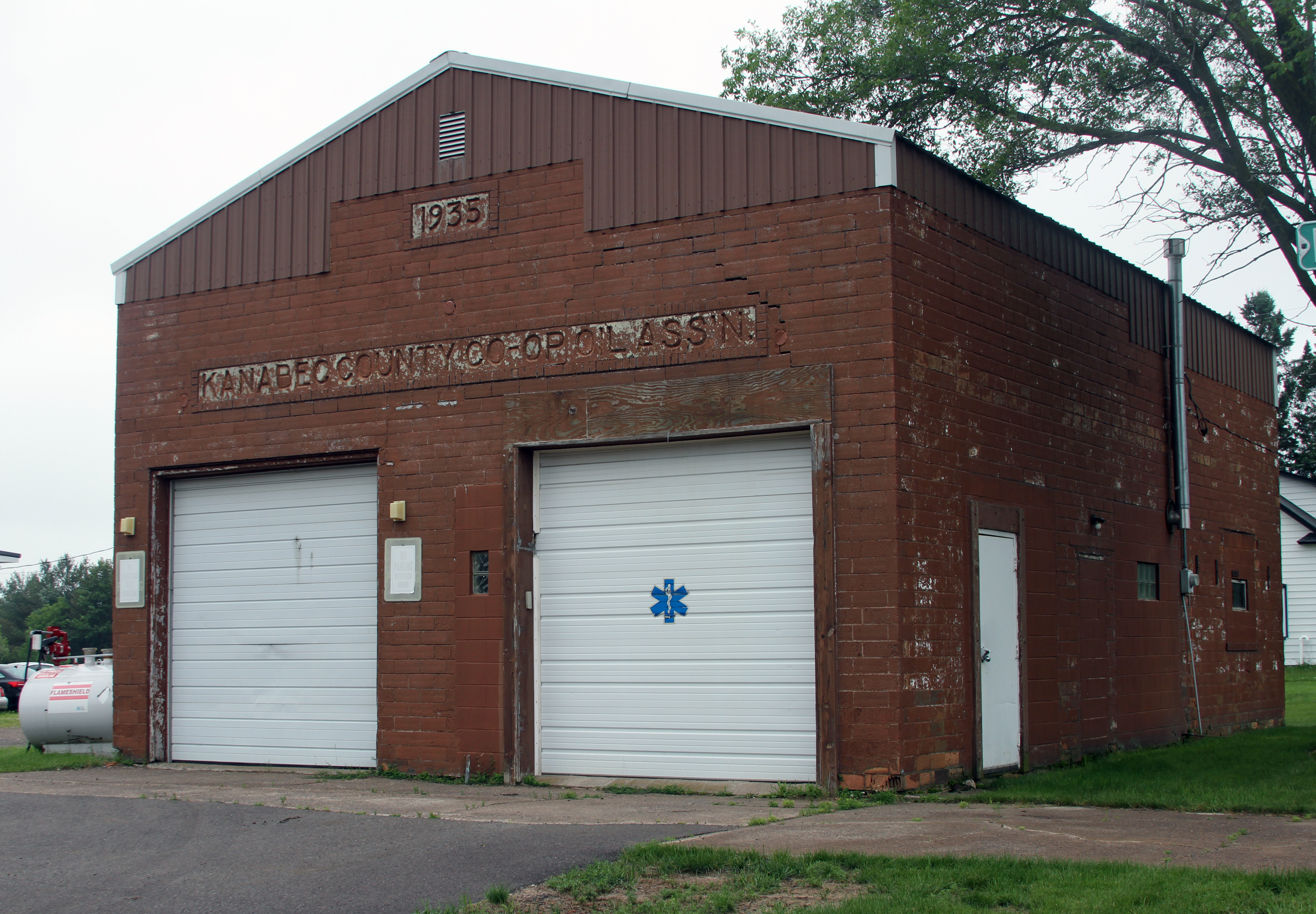
Former Kanabec County Co-op Oil Association building

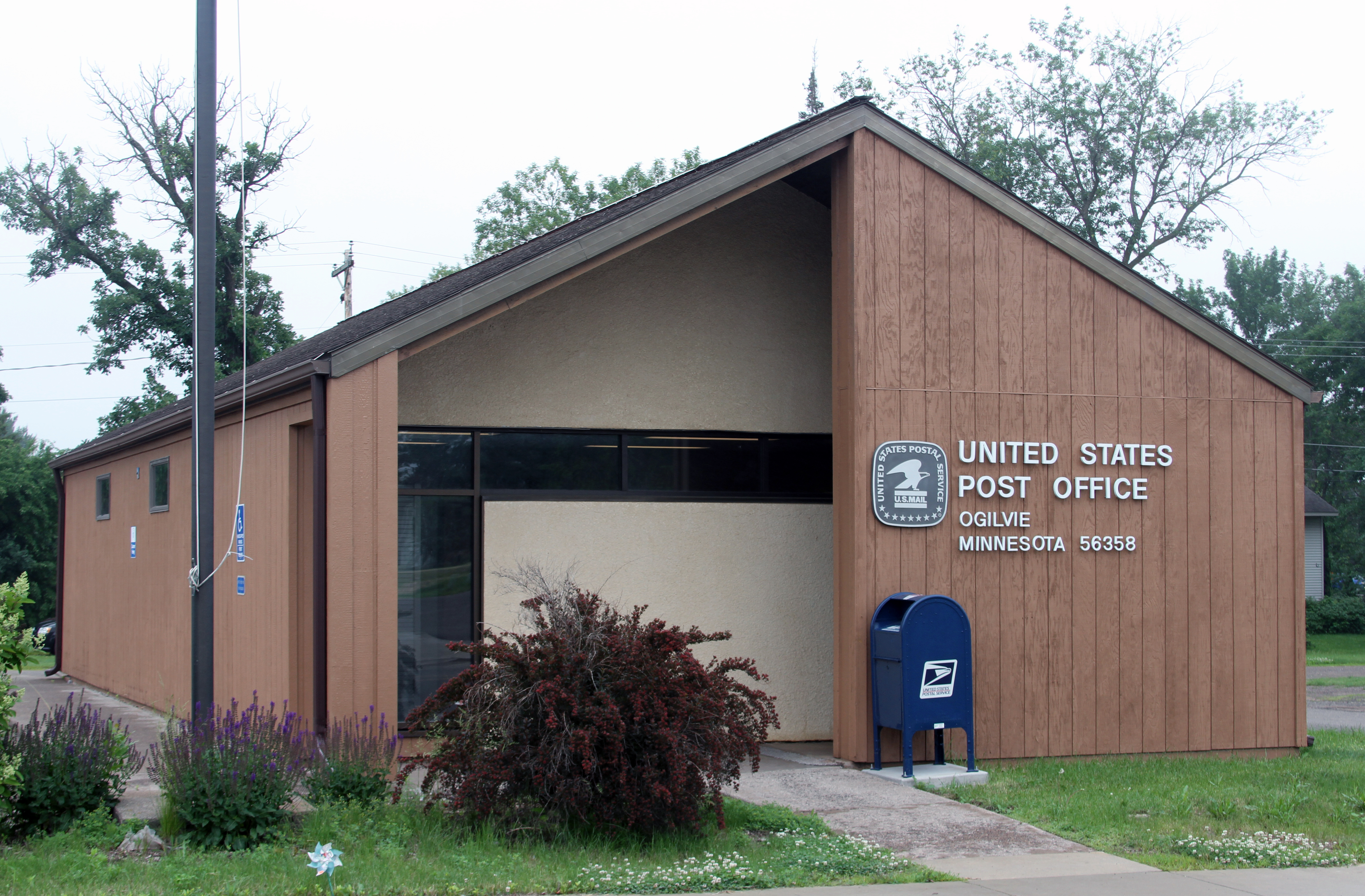
US Post Office

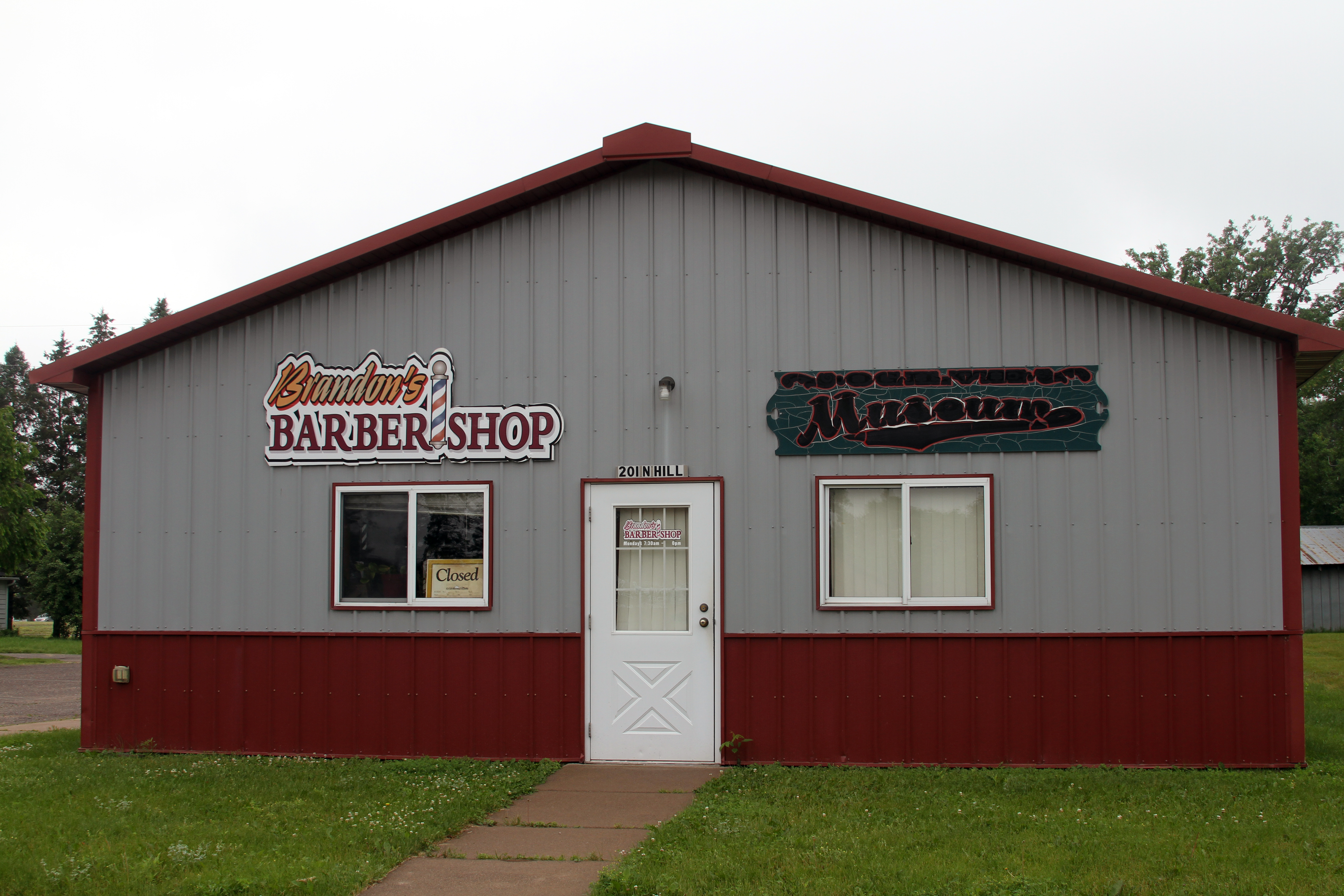
Ogilvie Museum
