= Estes Brook, Minnesota =

- Unincorporated community
- Location within Minnesota Location within the United States
- Coordinates: 45°38′56″N 93°44′14″W
- Country: United States
- State: Minnesota
- County: Mille Lacs
- Townships: Greenbush and Milo
- Elevation: 1,050 ft (320 m)
- Time zone: UTC-6 (Central (CST))
  - Summer (DST): UTC-5 (CDT)
- ZIP code: 56353
- Area code: 320
- GNIS feature ID: 643418

Estes Brook is an unincorporated community in Mille Lacs County, Minnesota, United States. The community is located near the junction of Mille Lacs County Road 7 and 70th Street. County Roads 12 and 13 are also in the immediate area.

Estes Brook is located within Greenbush Township and Milo Township. Nearby places include Milaca, Foreston, Oak Park, and Princeton.
