= Gail T. Kulick =

American politician

Member of the Minnesota House of Representatives from the 16A district
- In office January 6, 2009 – January 3, 2011
- Preceded by: Sondra Erickson
- Succeeded by: Sondra Erickson

Personal details
- Born: May 29, 1959 (age 67) Browerville, Minnesota
- Party: Minnesota Democratic-Farmer-Labor Party
- Spouse: Paul
- Children: 3
- Education: Hamline University; St. Cloud State University; University of Minnesota Law School
- Profession: Attorney, legislator

Gail T. Kulick (formerly Gail Kulick Jackson) (born May 29, 1959) is a Judge in Minnesota's Seventh Judicial District. Formerly, she was a Minnesota politician and member of the Minnesota House of Representatives who represented District 16A, which includes portions of Benton, Mille Lacs, Morrison and Sherburne counties in the west central part of the state. A Democrat, she was also an attorney.

Kulick was first elected in 2008, succeeding six-term Rep. Sondra Erickson. She was subsequently unseated in a re-match with Erickson in the 2010 general election. She was vice chair of the House's Civil Justice Committee, and was a member of the Public Safety Policy and Oversight Committee. She also served on the Finance subcommittees for the Early Childhood Finance and Policy Division and the Energy Finance and Policy Division.

Kulick graduated from Anoka High School in Anoka in 1977, then went on to Hamline University in Saint Paul and to St. Cloud State University in St. Cloud, where she received her B.A. summa cum laude in Classical Music in 1982. She earned her J.D. from the University of Minnesota Law School in 1985. She was an associate attorney with Gunderson and Swanson from 1985 to 1986, and has been an attorney with and owner of Kulick Law Office in Milaca since 1986. She was a public defender in Mille Lacs County from 1986 to 1993, city attorney for the cities of Foreston and Onamia from 1990 to 2000, and city attorney for the city of Milaca in 1994.

Active in her local community and in legal circles, Kulick is a member of the Milaca Chamber of Commerce. She served on the Milaca School Board and the Milaca Community Education Advisory Committee from 1987 to 1992, and was a member of the Milaca Economic Development Commission from 1989 to 1991, a board member and chair of Rum River Health Services Incorporated from 1987 to 2006, and a board member of the Mille Lacs Area Health Foundation since 2005. She has been a member of the Real Estate Legislation Committee/Title Standards Committee of the Minnesota State Bar Association since 1985, and a member of Minnesota Women Lawyers since 1986.
