= Maywood Township, Benton County, Minnesota =

Township in Minnesota, United States

Maywood Township
- Township
- Location within the state of Minnesota
- Coordinates: 45°41′24″N 93°49′5″W
- Country: United States
- State: Minnesota
- County: Benton

Area
  - Total: 35.7 sq mi (92.4 km^{2})
  - Land: 35.7 sq mi (92.4 km^{2})
- Elevation: 1,132 ft (345 m)

Population (2010)
  - Total: 954
  - Density: 27/sq mi (10.3/km^{2})
- Time zone: UTC-6 (Central (CST))
  - Summer (DST): UTC-5 (CDT)
- FIPS code: 27-41264
- GNIS feature ID: 0664938

Maywood Township is a township in Benton County, Minnesota, United States. The population was 954 as of the 2010 census. Maywood Township was organized in 1867.

== Geography ==
According to the United States Census Bureau, the township has a total area of 35.7 square miles (92.4 km^{2}), all land.

The former city of Ronneby reverted to being part of Maywood Township on May 4, 2009.

=== Unincorporated communities ===
- Oak Park
- Ronneby

=== Major highway ===
- Minnesota State Highway 23

=== Adjacent townships ===
- Granite Ledge Township (north)
- Milaca Township, Mille Lacs County (northeast)
- Milo Township, Mille Lacs County (east)
- Greenbush Township, Mille Lacs County (southeast)
- Glendorado Township (south)
- Gilmanton Township (west)
- Alberta Township (northwest)

=== Cemeteries ===
The township contains two cemeteries: Elwell and Maywood.

== Demographics ==
As of the census of 2000, there were 860 people, 302 households, and 243 families residing in the township. The population density was 24.4 people per square mile (9.4/km^{2}). There were 314 housing units at an average density of 8.9/sq mi (3.4/km^{2}). The racial makeup of the township was 97.79% White, 0.12% African American, 0.12% Native American, 0.23% Asian, 0.23% from other races, and 1.51% from two or more races. Hispanic or Latino of any race were 0.81% of the population.

There were 302 households, out of which 40.7% had children under the age of 18 living with them, 71.2% were married couples living together, 5.6% had a female householder with no husband present, and 19.5% were non-families. 16.2% of all households were made up of individuals, and 4.6% had someone living alone who was 65 years of age or older. The average household size was 2.85 and the average family size was 3.21.

In the township the population was spread out, with 29.9% under the age of 18, 8.6% from 18 to 24, 28.3% from 25 to 44, 24.4% from 45 to 64, and 8.8% who were 65 years of age or older. The median age was 34 years. For every 100 females, there were 100.0 males. For every 100 females age 18 and over, there were 108.7 males.

The median income for a household in the township was $47,500, and the median income for a family was $50,060. Males had a median income of $33,068 versus $21,696 for females. The per capita income for the township was $17,911. About 4.5% of families and 5.6% of the population were below the poverty line, including 3.8% of those under age 18 and 15.0% of those age 65 or over.
