= Glendorado Township, Benton County, Minnesota =

Township in Minnesota, United States

Glendorado Township
- Township
- Location within the state of Minnesota
- Coordinates: 45°35′38″N 93°48′53″W
- Country: United States
- State: Minnesota
- County: Benton

Area
  - Total: 36.5 sq mi (94.6 km^{2})
  - Land: 36.5 sq mi (94.5 km^{2})
  - Water: 0.039 sq mi (0.1 km^{2})
- Elevation: 1,063 ft (324 m)

Population (2010)
  - Total: 762
  - Density: 21/sq mi (8.1/km^{2})
- Time zone: UTC-6 (Central (CST))
  - Summer (DST): UTC-5 (CDT)
- FIPS code: 27-24020
- GNIS feature ID: 0664278

Glendorado Township is a township in Benton County, Minnesota, United States. The population was 762 as of the 2010 census.

== History ==
Glendorado Township was organized in 1868. Its name is partly derived from Spanish meaning "golden glen".

== Geography ==
According to the United States Census Bureau, the township has a total area of 36.5 square miles (94.6 km^{2}), of which 36.5 square miles (94.5 km^{2}) is land and 0.04 square miles (0.1 km^{2}), or 0.15%, is water.

=== Unincorporated communities ===
- Glendorado

=== Major highway ===
- Minnesota State Highway 95

=== Adjacent townships ===
- Maywood Township (north)
- Milo Township, Mille Lacs County (northeast)
- Greenbush Township, Mille Lacs County (east)
- Blue Hill Township, Sherburne County (southeast)
- Santiago Township, Sherburne County (south)
- Palmer Township, Sherburne County (southwest)
- St. George Township (west)
- Gilmanton Township (northwest)

=== Cemeteries ===
The township contains two cemeteries: Glendorado Lutheran Church and Saint Francis.

== Demographics ==
As of the census of 2000, there were 785 people, 251 households, and 205 families residing in the township. The population density was 21.5 people per square mile (8.3/km^{2}). There were 264 housing units at an average density of 7.2/sq mi (2.8/km^{2}). The racial makeup of the township was 97.71% White, 0.38% African American, 0.25% Native American, 0.13% Asian, 0.25% from other races, and 1.27% from two or more races. Hispanic or Latino of any race were 0.13% of the population.

There were 251 households, out of which 42.2% had children under the age of 18 living with them, 72.9% were married couples living together, 4.0% had a female householder with no husband present, and 18.3% were non-families. 15.1% of all households were made up of individuals, and 5.2% had someone living alone who was 65 years of age or older. The average household size was 3.13 and the average family size was 3.51.

In the township the population was spread out, with 29.9% under the age of 18, 11.1% from 18 to 24, 29.4% from 25 to 44, 19.6% from 45 to 64, and 9.9% who were 65 years of age or older. The median age was 35 years. For every 100 females, there were 112.7 males. For every 100 females age 18 and over, there were 105.2 males.

The median income for a household in the township was $49,643, and the median income for a family was $57,143. Males had a median income of $31,307 versus $26,250 for females. The per capita income for the township was $16,494. About 4.1% of families and 4.2% of the population were below the poverty line, including 3.7% of those under age 18 and 9.9% of those age 65 or over.
