= Long Siding, Minnesota =

- Unincorporated community
- Location within Minnesota Location within the United States
- Coordinates: 45°37′28″N 93°36′57″W
- Country: United States
- State: Minnesota
- County: Mille Lacs
- Township: Princeton
- Time zone: UTC-6 (Central (CST))
  - Summer (DST): UTC-5 (CDT)
- Area code: 320

Long Siding is an unincorporated community in Mille Lacs County, in the U.S. state of Minnesota.

== History ==
A post office called Long Siding was established in 1903, and remained in operation until 1954. The community was named for Edgar C. Long, a businessperson in the lumber industry.
