= Sondra Erickson =

American politician

Member of the Minnesota House of Representatives from the 15A district 16A (2011–2013)
- In office January 4, 2011 – January 2023
- Preceded by: Gail T. Kulick

Member of the Minnesota House of Representatives from the 16A district 17A (1998–2003)
- In office January 20, 1998 – January 5, 2009
- Preceded by: LeRoy Koppendrayer
- Succeeded by: Gail T. Kulick

Personal details
- Born: March 2, 1942 (age 84)
- Party: Republican Party of Minnesota
- Children: 1
- Education: Concordia College; University of St. Thomas
- Occupation: Educator, legislator

Sondra Erickson (born March 2, 1942) is a Minnesota politician and former member of the Minnesota House of Representatives. A member of the Republican Party of Minnesota, she represented District 15A, which includes portions of Kanabec, Mille Lacs, and Sherburne counties in the central part of the state. She is also a retired English teacher at Princeton High School in Princeton.

== Early education and career ==
Erickson graduated from Concordia College in Moorhead, receiving her B.A. in English. She later attended graduate school at the University of St. Thomas in Saint Paul. In addition to her career as an educator, she served on the Minnesota Board of Teaching from 1992 to 1997, and on the Minnesota Statehood Sesquicentennial Commission from 2006 to 2008.

== Minnesota House of Representatives ==
Erickson was first elected to the House in a 1998 special election, held after Rep. LeRoy Koppendrayer resigned to accept an appointment to the Minnesota Public Utilities Commission by Minnesota Governor Arne Carlson. She was re-elected in 2000, 2002, 2004 and 2006. Prior to the 2002 legislative redistricting, she represented the old District 17A. She was unseated by Gail Kulick Jackson in the 2008 election, losing by just 89 votes after a recount. In 2010, she ran again, unseating Jackson with 55.38% to 44.39% of the vote.

She served as chair of the Ethics Committee from 2003 to 2007 and from 2015 to 2018.
