= Mudgett =

Mudgett, an English-language family name and place name in America, may refer to:

- Mudgett Township, Minnesota
- Herman Webster Mudgett, a.k.a. H. H. Holmes, 19th-century American serial killer
- The Mudgetts, a Wisconsin punk rock band
- Mudgett, a 1976 piece by Warren Casey
