= Cove, Minnesota =

Cove, Minnesota Wiikwegamaang (Ojibwe)
- Unincorporated community
- Location within Minnesota Location within the United States
- Coordinates: 46°06′31″N 93°37′07″W
- Country: United States
- State: Minnesota
- County: Mille Lacs
- Township: South Harbor
- Elevation: 1,263 ft (385 m)
- Time zone: UTC-6 (Central (CST))
  - Summer (DST): UTC-5 (CDT)
- ZIP code: 56359
- Area code: 320
- GNIS feature ID: 642399

Cove (Ojibwe: Wiikwegamaang) is an unincorporated community in South Harbor Township, Mille Lacs County, Minnesota, United States, near Onamia. The community is located along State Highway 27 (MN 27) near 100th Avenue.
