= Opstead, Minnesota =

- Unincorporated community
- Location within Minnesota Location within the United States
- Coordinates: 46°14′02″N 93°28′20″W
- Country: United States
- State: Minnesota
- County: Mille Lacs
- Township: East Side
- Elevation: 1,309 ft (399 m)
- Time zone: UTC-6 (Central (CST))
  - Summer (DST): UTC-5 (CDT)
- ZIP code: 56342
- Area code: 320
- GNIS feature ID: 648983

Opstead is an unincorporated community in East Side Township, Mille Lacs County, Minnesota, United States, near Isle and Malmo. It is along 475th Street near 30th Avenue, Mille Lacs County Road 30.

A post office called Opstead was established in 1889, and remained in operation until 1933. The community was originally built up chiefly by Swedes.
