= Fog Lake (Mille Lacs County, Minnesota) =

Lake in the state of Minnesota, United States

- Location within Minnesota Location within the United States
- Location: Mille Lacs County, Minnesota
- Coordinates: 45°36′6″N 93°35′39″W
- Type: lake
- Basin countries: United States
- Surface elevation: 974 ft (297 m)

Fog Lake is a lake in Mille Lacs County, in the U.S. state of Minnesota. The lake is just east of US Route 169 approximately one mile north of Princeton.

Fog Lake was named for Frederick A. Fogg, a pioneer settler.

== See also ==
- List of lakes in Minnesota
