= Bayview, Minnesota =

- Unincorporated community
- Location within Minnesota Location within the United States
- Coordinates: 46°07′08″N 93°36′12″W
- Country: United States
- State: Minnesota
- County: Mille Lacs
- Township: South Harbor
- Elevation: 1,257 ft (383 m)
- Time zone: UTC-6 (Central (CST))
  - Summer (DST): UTC-5 (CDT)
- ZIP code: 56359
- Area code: 320
- GNIS feature ID: 639748

Bayview is an unincorporated community in South Harbor Township, Mille Lacs County, Minnesota, United States. The community is located along State Highway 27 (MN 27) at 92nd Avenue near Onamia and Isle.
