= Onamia =

Onamia is the name of a city and a township in Mille Lacs County, Minnesota, in the United States:

- Onamia, Minnesota
- Onamia Township, Mille Lacs County, Minnesota
