= Milaca Municipal Hall =

- U.S. National Register of Historic Places
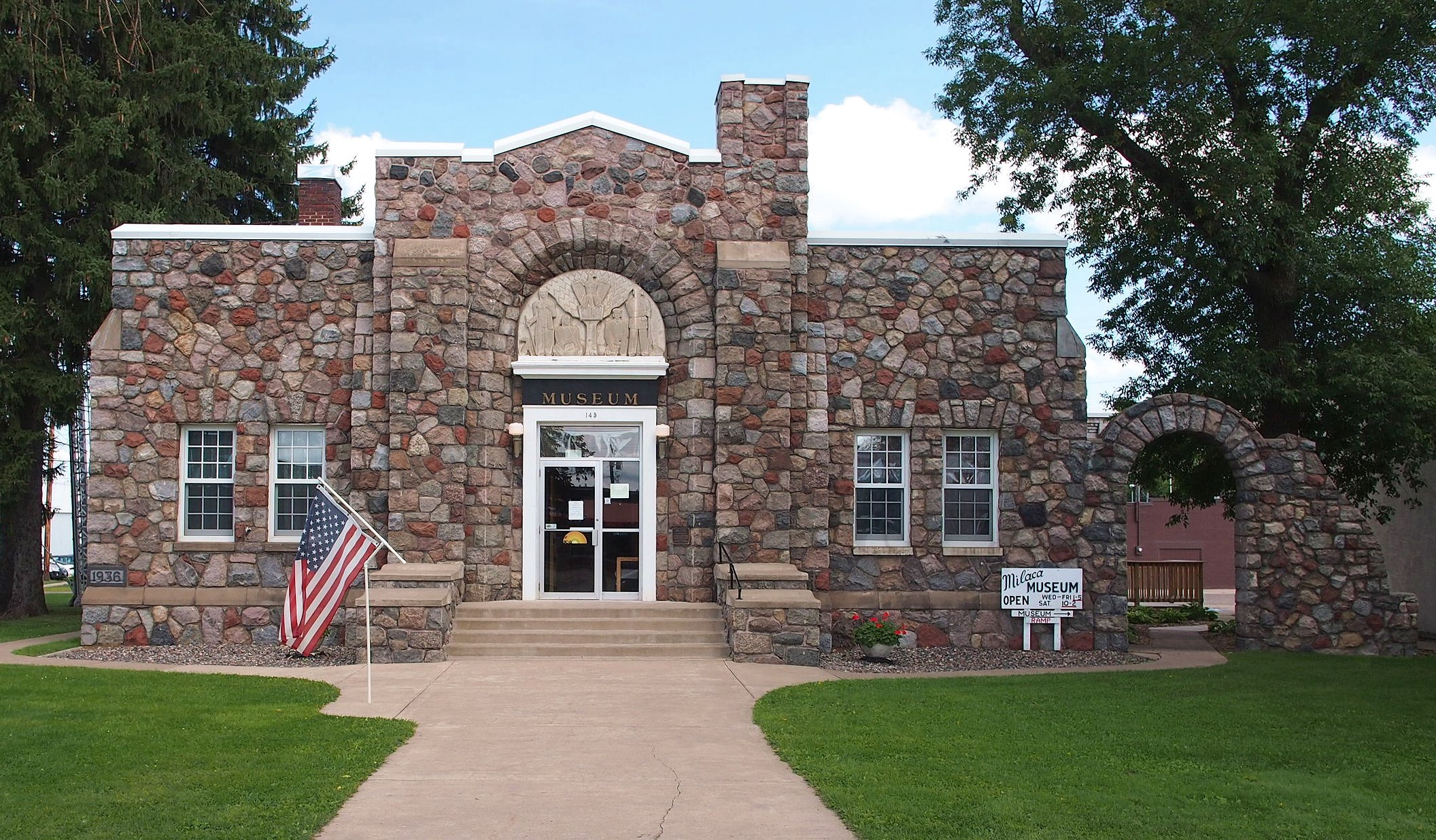
- Milaca Municipal Hall from the west

- Location within Minnesota Location within the United States
- Location: Milaca, Minnesota
- Coordinates: 45°45′15″N 93°39′3″W
- Area: less than one acre
- Built: 1936
- Architect: Louis C. Pinault
- Architectural style: Moderne
- NRHP reference No.: 85002201
- Added to NRHP: September 11, 1985

The Milaca Municipal Hall or Milaca City Hall, located at 145 Central Ave, South in Milaca, Minnesota, United States, was built using fieldstone, brick, and concrete. The building is a typical example of construction performed by the Works Progress Administration during the Great Depression. One hundred fifty-five workers and six superintendents labored to construct the flagstone-faced municipal hall. The building provided space for the fire department and village council in the back of the building, for a library in the south end, and a community kitchen to the left of the entry adjacent to a 200-seat auditorium. The American Legion had space in the basement. The facility was also available for use by church and service organizations. The building currently serves as the local museum and history center. Artwork was funded by the Federal Arts Project and executed by André Boratko.

Its National Register nomination in 1985 asserted the building is Moderne in style, although noting the use of fieldstone provides an Arts and Crafts character.
