= Lake Lena, Minnesota =

Lake Lena Aazhoomog
- Unincorporated community
- Location within Minnesota
- Coordinates: 46°03′41″N 92°27′40.2″W
- Country: United States
- State: Minnesota
- County: Pine
- Township: Ogema Township
- Elevation: 1,017 ft (310 m)
- Time zone: UTC-6 (Central (CST))
  - Summer (DST): UTC-5 (CDT)
- Area code: 320
- GNIS feature ID: 1815033

Lake Lena is an unincorporated community and Native American village in Ogema Township, Pine County, Minnesota, United States, located along the Lower Tamarack River. It currently is the administrative center for the Mille Lacs Indian Reservation, District III.

Lake Lena is located 25 miles east of Hinckley; and seven miles west-northwest of Danbury, Wisconsin. Lake Lena is 24 miles east-southeast of Sandstone.

Grace Lake Road (Pine County 173) serves as a main route in the community. State Highway 48 (MN 48) is nearby.

The community name in the Ojibwe language is Aazhoomog, meaning "Crossroads" in reference to being at the former crossroad of the north–south trail connecting Bikoganaagan (Danbury), via the former Agaming (Outflow/"Lower Tamarack River Village"), and the former Gibaakwa'iganing (Tozer Camp/"lower Upper Tamarack River Village") with the east–west trail connecting Mooningwanekaaning (La Pointe), via Namekaawa'iganing (Gordon), with Gaa-zhiigwanaabikokaag (Hinckley).

== History ==
=== Pre-Dakota ===
Before the arrival of the Dakota Sioux, the area about Lake Lena was inhabited by the Cheyenne, Meskwaki and Ho-Chunk, with migratory Gros Ventre, Mandwe and Menominee peoples. The Lake Lena area served as a place abundant with food, in the heart of the Folle Avoine Region, with wild rice and sturgeon. In addition, the Lake Lena Village was located along the site of the annual bear migratory path.

=== Dakota ===
With the arrival of the Dakota Sioux, only the Meskwaki remained as permanent residents of the region. However, occasional Cheyenne, Ho-Chunk and Menominee peoples still came to the area for the wild rice. The Santee Sioux maintained a trade network routes offered by the St. Croix River, and the series of trails connecting the Lake Lena Village with Lake Superior, Mississippi River headwaters and other major upper Mississippi River destinations, Red Cedar River and Chippewa River. With the arrival of the Ojibwe from the cultural center in La Pointe, the area about the upper St. Croix River became a contested place. Though the Meskwaki were permanently pushed out of the area, the Dakota and Ojibwe eventually came to peace and lived side-by-side.

=== Manoominikeshiinyag Ojibwe ===
After the Ojibwe had gained control of the upper St. Croix River valley, the Lake Lena area became one of many network of trade villages. However, in the 1825 First Treaty of Prairie du Chien, the United States formally drew the boundaries separating the Dakota and the Ojibwe. For the Lake Lena and other Manoominikeshiinyag Ojibwe, already intertwined with the Dakota, this posed a problem. With agreements, the more southern Dakota north of the "Prairie du Chien Line" moved south of the line with the more northern Dakota north of the line were adopted as "Ojibwe" and became the Wolf Totem. Meanwhile, many of the Ojibwe located south of the line were adopted into the Mdewakanton. By maintaining the trade network but with a different tribal association, Aazhoomog transitioned from a Dakota-Ojibwe village to a fully Ojibwe village. The Manoominikeshiinyag Ojibwe of the upper St. Croix River valley became one of the signatories to the 1837 Treaty of St. Peters and the 1842 Treaty of La Pointe. The 1837 treaty, dubbed the "White Pine Treaty", brought an influx of lumber industry. After the Sandy Lake Tragedy, the United States encouraged the consolidation of the Ojibwe onto Indian Reservations rather than removing them west of the Mississippi River. In the treaty negotiations for the 1854 Treaty of La Pointe, St. Croix Chippewa realized that a central reservation would be created immediately south of the Upper St. Croix Lake near Solon Springs, Wisconsin. Due to strong lumber interests, the Manoominikeshiinyag Ojibwe knew the removal to a reservation would mean eventual loss of hunting, fishing and gathering rights promised the 1837 and 1842 treaties. Upon this realization, the St. Croix Chippewa refuted all provisions of the treaty negotiations and did not sign the 1854 treaty. However, by not signing the treaty, the St. Croix Chippewa lost their federal recognition. However, even as un-recognized Indian Tribe, the St. Croix Chippewa was still eligible to receive their annuities. Depending on the time and location, peoples of St. Croix Chippewa went to either the Mille Lacs Indian Reservation or to the Lac Courte Oreilles Indian Reservation. Eventually, the Lake Lena Village, through the lumber operations in the region, went to the Mille Lacs Indian Reservation more often than to the Lac Courte Oreilles Indian Reservation.

=== Mille Lacs Band of Ojibwe ===
After the loss of federal recognition of the St. Croix Chippewa, the population of the Aazhoomog slowly declined. For their annuity payment, the people of Aazhoomog were sent to either the Lake Mille Lacs Indian Reservation or the Lac Courte Oreilles Indian Reservation. Eventually, the Aazhoomog Village, through the lumber operations in the region, went to the Mille Lacs Indian Reservation more often than to the Lac Courte Oreilles Indian Reservation. Aazhoomog's English name "Lake Lena" came about during this time, named after Mrs. Lena Thayer, who operated a post office until the early 1920s. Beginning in 1922, under the authority of the Consolidated Chippewa Agency, Lake Lena Village began receiving services independent of the Mille Lacs Indians or the Lac Courte Oreilles Band of Lake Superior Chippewa Indians. In 1936, when Minnesota Chippewa Tribe was created under the Indian Reorganization Act of 1934, the Manoominikeshiinyag Ojibwe was further divided between those located in Minnesota and those located in Wisconsin.

When the contemporary Mille Lacs Band of Ojibwe was organized, its charter included the Mille Lacs Indians, Sandy Lake Band of Mississippi Chippewa, Rice Lake Band of Mississippi Chippewa and the St. Croix Band of Chippewa Indians. This was praised in the Lake Lena Village for regaining Federal recognition after 85 years of not having Federal recognition, though it was not independent Federal recognition. However, this posed a major problem for the Manoominikeshiinyag Ojibwe on the Wisconsin side, especially for those living about Danbury, Wisconsin since the charter also included them, yet they were not eligible to receive services from the Consolidated Chippewa Agency of Minnesota. The remaining St. Croix Chippewa on the Wisconsin side, in order to maintain cohesion of the un-recognized tribe, sought and gained Federal recognition independent of both the Mille Lacs and Lac Courte Oreilles Indian Reservations, becoming the contemporary St. Croix Chippewa Indians of Wisconsin.

Today, the Aazhoomog village houses the Mille Lacs Indian Reservation District III Government Services and Community Center and the Aazhoomog Clinic of the Ne-Ia-Shing Clinic System. The United States Postal Service places Aazhoomog under Sandstone, Minnesota, though a separate community of Asiniikaaning exists. The Lake Lena Village relies on the nearby Swiss Township fire department for fire emergencies. Near the village, the Mille Lacs Band operates the Crossroads Marathon gas station, convenience store, and laundromat.
