= Ronneby, Minnesota =

Unincorporated community in Minnesota, United States

Ronneby
- Census-designated place (CDP) and Unincorporated community
- Location of the community of Ronneby within Maywood Township, Benton County
- Coordinates: 45°41′07″N 93°51′36″W
- Country: United States
- State: Minnesota
- County: Benton
- Township: Maywood Township

Area
  - Total: 0.97 sq mi (2.50 km^{2})
  - Land: 0.97 sq mi (2.50 km^{2})
  - Water: 0 sq mi (0.00 km^{2})
- Elevation: 1,116 ft (340 m)

Population (2020)
  - Total: 71
  - Density: 73.7/sq mi (28.46/km^{2})
- Time zone: UTC-6 (Central (CST))
  - Summer (DST): UTC-5 (CDT)
- ZIP code: 56329 and 56357
- Area code: 320
- FIPS code: 27-55366
- GNIS feature ID: 2628690

Ronneby is an unincorporated community and census-designated place (CDP) in Maywood Township, Benton County, Minnesota, United States. As of the 2020 census, Ronneby had a population of 71. The community is located along State Highway 23 (MN 23) near Benton County Road 6.

Nearby places include Foley and Oak Park. Ronneby is part of the Saint Cloud Metropolitan Statistical Area.

== History ==
Ronneby was incorporated on August 31, 1899. It was originally named Saint Francis, but changed when the post office was established in 1897, because that name was already in use. Ronneby had its own post office from 1897 to 1973.

In the early 20th century, Ronneby was at its height, featuring a hotel, a newspaper, a lumber mill, and three stores. It was an incorporated city until May 4, 2009. In November 2008, citizens voted 18–9 to dissolve the city. The city had also voted to dissolve in 1998 but proper procedures were not followed and the vote was invalidated. In May 2009, the city became part of Maywood Township. The population was 16 at the 2000 census. Ronneby had a population of 156 in 1900, 132 in 1910, and 76 in 1920.

Ronneby was named from Ronneby, Sweden, the seat of Ronneby Municipality, near Karlskrona in Blekinge County, on the River Ronneby near its mouth in the Baltic Sea.

== Geography ==
According to the United States Census Bureau, Ronneby has a total area of 1.0 square mile (2.6 km^{2}), all land.

Ronneby is located within sections 19 and 20 of Maywood Township. The West Branch of the St. Francis River flows through the community.

Historical population
Census	Pop.	Note	%±
1900	156		—
1910	132		−15.4%
1920	76		−42.4%
1930	75		−1.3%
1940	107		42.7%
1950	72		−32.7%
1960	84		16.7%
1970	59		−29.8%
1980	56		−5.1%
1990	58		3.6%
2000	16		−72.4%
2010	67		318.8%
2020	71		6.0%
U.S. Decennial Census

== Demographics ==
As of the census of 2000, there were 16 people, 6 households, and 3 families residing in the city. The population density was 64.5 inhabitants per square mile (24.9/km^{2}). There were 7 housing units at an average density of 28.2 per square mile (10.9/km^{2}). The racial makeup of the city was 100.00% White.

There were 6 households, out of which 50.0% had children under the age of 18 living with them, 33.3% were married couples living together, and 50.0% were non-families. 33.3% of all households were made up of individuals, and 16.7% had someone living alone who was 65 years of age or older. The average household size was 2.67 and the average family size was 3.67.

In the city the population was spread out, with 31.3% under the age of 18, 18.8% from 18 to 24, 12.5% from 25 to 44, 18.8% from 45 to 64, and 18.8% who were 65 years of age or older. The median age was 28 years. For every 100 females, there were 220.0 males. For every 100 females age 18 and over, there were 175.0 males.

The median income for a household in the city was $40,625, and the median income for a family was $31,250. Males had a median income of $31,250 versus $0 for females. The per capita income for the city was $11,700. None of the population and none of the families were below the poverty line.

== See also ==
- Ronneby, Sweden
