= Lewis Township, Mille Lacs County, Minnesota =

Lewis Township, Minnesota
- Township
- Location within the state of Minnesota Lewis Township, Minnesota (the United States)
- Coordinates: 46°2′5″N 93°29′5″W
- Country: United States
- State: Minnesota
- County: Mille Lacs

Area
  - Total: 36.0 sq mi (93.2 km^{2})
  - Land: 35.8 sq mi (92.6 km^{2})
  - Water: 0.23 sq mi (0.6 km^{2})
- Elevation: 1,211 ft (369 m)

Population (2010)
  - Total: 52
  - Density: 1.5/sq mi (0.56/km^{2})
- Time zone: UTC-6 (Central (CST))
  - Summer (DST): UTC-5 (CDT)
- FIPS code: 27-36782
- GNIS feature ID: 0664769

Lewis Township is a township in Mille Lacs County, Minnesota, United States. The population was 52 at the 2010 census.

== Geography ==
According to the United States Census Bureau, the township has a total area of 36.0 square miles (93 km^{2}), of which 35.7 square miles (92 km^{2}) is land and 0.2 square miles (0.52 km^{2}), or 0.69%, is water.

== Demographics ==
As of the census of 2000, there were 51 people, 25 households, and 14 families residing in the township. The population density was 1.4 inhabitants per square mile (0.54/km^{2}). There were 51 housing units at an average density of 1.4 per square mile (0.54/km^{2}). The racial makeup of the township was 100.00% White.

There were 25 households, out of which 16.0% had children under the age of 18 living with them, 52.0% were married couples living together, 4.0% had a female householder with no husband present, and 44.0% were non-families. 32.0% of all households were made up of individuals, and none had someone living alone who was 65 years of age or older. The average household size was 2.04 and the average family size was 2.64.

In the township the population was spread out, with 17.6% under the age of 18, 5.9% from 18 to 24, 25.5% from 25 to 44, 39.2% from 45 to 64, and 11.8% who were 65 years of age or older. The median age was 45 years. For every 100 females, there were 112.5 males. For every 100 females age 18 and over, there were 133.3 males.

The median income for a household in the township was $33,750, and the median income for a family was $58,750. Males had a median income of $38,750 versus $21,250 for females. The per capita income for the township was $20,360. There were 16.7% of families and 25.4% of the population living below the poverty line, including 45.5% of under eighteens and 22.2% of those over 64.
