= Bogus Brook Township, Mille Lacs County, Minnesota =

Bogus Brook Township, Minnesota
- Township
- Location within the state of Minnesota Bogus Brook Township, Minnesota (the United States)
- Coordinates: 45°41′22″N 93°34′49″W
- Country: United States
- State: Minnesota
- County: Mille Lacs

Area
  - Total: 36.2 sq mi (93.8 km^{2})
  - Land: 35.8 sq mi (92.8 km^{2})
  - Water: 0.39 sq mi (1.0 km^{2})
- Elevation: 980 ft (300 m)

Population (2010)
  - Total: 1,421
  - Density: 39.7/sq mi (15.3/km^{2})
- Time zone: UTC-6 (Central (CST))
  - Summer (DST): UTC-5 (CDT)
- FIPS code: 27-06850
- GNIS feature ID: 0663631

Bogus Brook Township is a township in Mille Lacs County, Minnesota, United States. The population was 1,421 at the 2010 census.

Bogus Brook Township was named for Bogus Brook creek.

== Geography ==
According to the United States Census Bureau, the township has a total area of 36.2 square miles (93.8 km^{2}), of which 35.8 square miles (92.8 km^{2}) is land and 0.39 square miles (1.0 km^{2}), or 1.11%, is water.

== Demographics ==
As of the census of 2000, there were 1,038 people, 352 households, and 297 families residing in the township. The population density was 28.7 inhabitants per square mile (11.1/km^{2}). There were 361 housing units at an average density of 10.0 per square mile (3.9/km^{2}). The racial makeup of the township was 96.44% White, 1.54% African American, 0.48% Native American, 0.48% Asian, 0.10% from other races, and 0.96% from two or more races. Hispanic or Latino of any race were 1.06% of the population.

There were 352 households, out of which 40.6% had children under the age of 18 living with them, 77.0% were married couples living together, 4.0% had a female householder with no husband present, and 15.6% were non-families. 13.1% of all households were made up of individuals, and 4.0% had someone living alone who was 65 years of age or older. The average household size was 2.95 and the average family size was 3.22.

In the township the population was spread out, with 30.8% under the age of 18, 5.9% from 18 to 24, 29.4% from 25 to 44, 22.8% from 45 to 64, and 11.1% who were 65 years of age or older. The median age was 36 years. For every 100 females, there were 99.2 males. For every 100 females age 18 and over, there were 105.1 males.

The median income for a household in the township was $40,238, and the median income for a family was $42,039. Males had a median income of $31,125 versus $23,250 for females. The per capita income for the township was $16,604. About 4.2% of families and 6.0% of the population were below the poverty line, including 6.5% of those under age 18 and 7.8% of those age 65 or over.
