= Bradbury Township, Mille Lacs County, Minnesota =

Bradbury Township, Minnesota
- Township
- Location within the state of Minnesota Bradbury Township, Minnesota (the United States)
- Coordinates: 46°1′59″N 93°44′29″W
- Country: United States
- State: Minnesota
- County: Mille Lacs

Area
  - Total: 36.7 sq mi (95.0 km^{2})
  - Land: 36.7 sq mi (95.0 km^{2})
  - Water: 0 sq mi (0.0 km^{2})
- Elevation: 1,280 ft (390 m)

Population (2010)
  - Total: 268
  - Density: 7.31/sq mi (2.82/km^{2})
- Time zone: UTC-6 (Central (CST))
  - Summer (DST): UTC-5 (CDT)
- FIPS code: 27-07210
- GNIS feature ID: 0663645

Bradbury Township is a township in Mille Lacs County, Minnesota, United States. As of the 2010 census, the township population was 268.

== Geography ==
According to the United States Census Bureau, the township has a total area of 36.7 square miles (95 km^{2}), of which 36.7 square miles (95 km^{2}) is land and 0.04 square miles (0.10 km^{2}), or 0.05%, is water.

== Demographics ==
As of the census of 2000, there were 203 people, 70 households, and 52 families residing in the township. The population density was 5.5 inhabitants per square mile (2.1/km^{2}). There were 99 housing units at an average density of 2.7 per square mile (1.0/km^{2}). The racial makeup of the township was 97.54% White, 0.99% Asian, and 1.48% from two or more races.

There were 70 households, out of which 38.6% had children under the age of 18 living with them, 65.7% were married couples living together, 4.3% had a female householder with no husband present, and 25.7% were non-families. 18.6% of all households were made up of individuals, and 8.6% had someone living alone who was 65 years of age or older. The average household size was 2.90 and the average family size was 3.29.

In the township the population was spread out, with 29.1% under the age of 18, 7.4% from 18 to 24, 31.5% from 25 to 44, 23.6% from 45 to 64, and 8.4% who were 65 years of age or older. The median age was 35 years. For every 100 females, there were 95.2 males. For every 100 females age 18 and over, there were 102.8 males.

The median income for a household in the township was $38,750, and the median income for a family was $50,469. Males had a median income of $30,625 versus $25,625 for females. The per capita income for the township was $16,857. None of the families and 2.0% of the population were living below the poverty line, including no under eighteens and 12.5% of those over 64.
