= Milaca Municipal Airport =

Milaca Municipal Airport Milaca Airport
- IATA: none; ICAO: none; FAA LID: 18Y

Summary
- Airport type: Public
- Owner: City of Milaca
- Serves: Milaca, Minnesota
- Elevation AMSL: 1,100 ft / 335 m
- Coordinates: 45°46′21″N 093°37′56″W
- Website: MilacaAirport.com

Map

Runways
Direction	Length		Surface
Direction	ft	m	Surface
16/34	2,900	884	Turf

Statistics (2008)
- Aircraft operations: 8,000
- Based aircraft: 27
- Sources: Minnesota DOT, FAA

Milaca Municipal Airport (FAA LID: 18Y) is two miles northeast of City of Milaca, in Mille Lacs County, Minnesota.

== Facilities ==
The airport covers 40 acres (16 ha) at an elevation of 1,100 feet (335 m). Its single grass runway, 16/34, is 2,900 by 150 feet (884 x 46 m).

In the year ending August 31, 2008 the airport had 8,000 general aviation aircraft operations, average 21 per day. 27 aircraft were then based at this airport: 96% single-engine and 4% ultralight.

== See also ==
- List of airports in Minnesota
