= Oak Park, Minnesota =

Unincorporated community in Minnesota, US

Oak Park
- Unincorporated community
- Location within Minnesota Location within the United States
- Coordinates: 45°41′52″N 93°49′05″W
- Country: United States
- State: Minnesota
- County: Benton
- Township: Maywood Township
- Elevation: 1,132 ft (345 m)
- Time zone: UTC-6 (Central (CST))
  - Summer (DST): UTC-5 (CDT)
- ZIP code: 56357
- Area code: 320
- GNIS feature ID: 648844

Oak Park is an unincorporated community in Maywood Township, Benton County, Minnesota, United States. The community is located along State Highway 23 (MN 23) near Benton County Road 7. Nearby places include Foley, Ronneby, and Foreston.

Oak Park has a post office with ZIP code 56357.

Oak Park was named for a grove of oak trees near the town site.
