= Dailey Township, Mille Lacs County, Minnesota =

Dailey Township, Minnesota
- Township
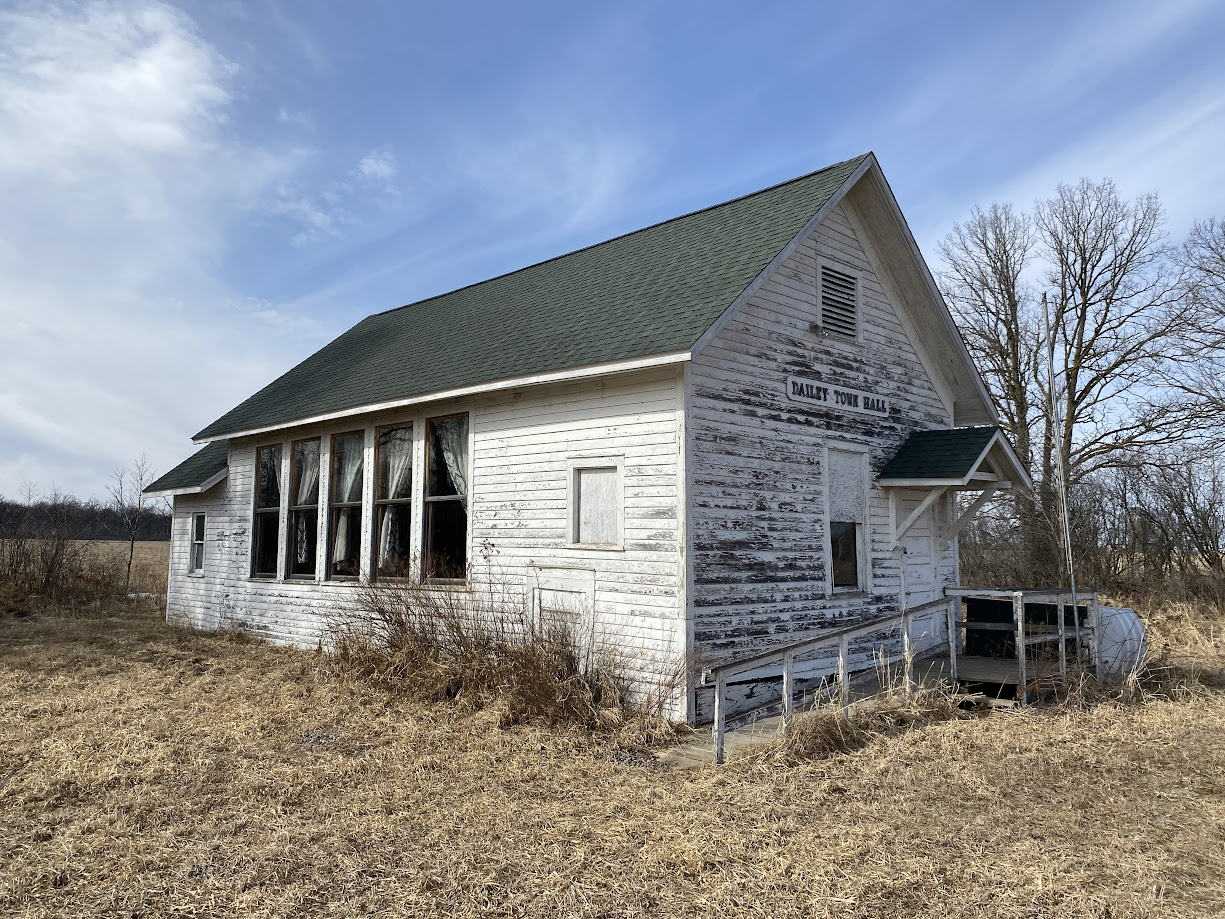
- Dailey Town Hall

- Location within the state of Minnesota Dailey Township, Minnesota (the United States)
- Coordinates: 45°57′25″N 93°40′58″W
- Country: United States
- State: Minnesota
- County: Mille Lacs

Area
  - Total: 30.8 sq mi (79.9 km^{2})
  - Land: 30.7 sq mi (79.4 km^{2})
  - Water: 0.19 sq mi (0.5 km^{2})
- Elevation: 1,230 ft (375 m)

Population (2010)
  - Total: 234
  - Density: 7.63/sq mi (2.95/km^{2})
- Time zone: UTC-6 (Central (CST))
  - Summer (DST): UTC-5 (CDT)
- FIPS code: 27-14500
- GNIS feature ID: 0663914

Dailey Township is a township in Mille Lacs County, Minnesota, United States. The population was 234 at the 2010 census.

Dailey Township was named for Asa R. Dailey, a pioneer settler.

== Geography ==
According to the United States Census Bureau, the township has a total area of 30.8 square miles (79.9 km^{2}), of which 30.7 square miles (79.4 km^{2}) is land and 0.19 square miles (0.5 km^{2}), or 0.66%, is water.

== Demographics ==
As of the census of 2000, there were 246 people, 89 households, and 70 families residing in the township. The population density was 7.9 inhabitants per square mile (3.1/km^{2}). There were 127 housing units at an average density of 4.1 per square mile (1.6/km^{2}). The racial makeup of the township was 99.59% White and 0.41% African American. Hispanic or Latino of any race were 2.85% of the population.

There were 89 households, out of which 37.1% had children under the age of 18 living with them, 65.2% were married couples living together, 10.1% had a female householder with no husband present, and 21.3% were non-families. 14.6% of all households were made up of individuals, and 3.4% had someone living alone who was 65 years of age or older. The average household size was 2.76 and the average family size was 3.06.

In the township the population was spread out, with 28.5% under the age of 18, 5.7% from 18 to 24, 29.3% from 25 to 44, 25.2% from 45 to 64, and 11.4% who were 65 years of age or older. The median age was 37 years. For every 100 females, there were 101.6 males. For every 100 females age 18 and over, there were 102.3 males.

The median income for a household in the township was $35,893, and the median income for a family was $36,786. Males had a median income of $32,250 versus $20,208 for females. The per capita income for the township was $14,130. About 6.9% of families and 10.2% of the population were below the poverty line, including 11.1% of those under the age of eighteen and 7.4% of those 65 or over.
