= Isle Harbor Township, Mille Lacs County, Minnesota =

Isle Harbor Township, Minnesota
- Township
- Location within the state of Minnesota Isle Harbor Township, Minnesota (the United States)
- Coordinates: 46°7′36″N 93°30′34″W
- Country: United States
- State: Minnesota
- County: Mille Lacs

Area
  - Total: 32.2 sq mi (83.3 km^{2})
  - Land: 27.1 sq mi (70.2 km^{2})
  - Water: 5.0 sq mi (13.0 km^{2})
- Elevation: 1,270 ft (387 m)

Population (2010)
  - Total: 593
  - Density: 21.9/sq mi (8.45/km^{2})
- Time zone: UTC-6 (Central (CST))
  - Summer (DST): UTC-5 (CDT)
- FIPS code: 27-31490
- GNIS feature ID: 0664565
- Website: https://www.isleharbortownship.com/

Isle Harbor Township is a township in Mille Lacs County, Minnesota, United States. The population was 593 at the 2010 census.

Isle Harbor Township was named for the island near its harbor on Mille Lacs Lake.

== Geography ==
According to the United States Census Bureau, the township has a total area of 32.2 square miles (83 km^{2}), of which 27.1 square miles (70 km^{2}) is land and 5.0 square miles (13 km^{2}), or 15.68%, is water.

== Demographics ==
As of the census of 2000, there were 590 people, 240 households, and 169 families residing in the township. The population density was 21.8 inhabitants per square mile (8.4/km^{2}). There were 382 housing units at an average density of 14.1 per square mile (5.4/km^{2}). The racial makeup of the township was 96.95% White, 0.17% African American, 2.71% Native American, and 0.17% from two or more races. Hispanic or Latino of any race were 0.68% of the population.

There were 240 households, out of which 27.1% had children under the age of 18 living with them, 62.9% were married couples living together, 4.6% had a female householder with no husband present, and 29.2% were non-families. 22.9% of all households were made up of individuals, and 10.0% had someone living alone who was 65 years of age or older. The average household size was 2.45 and the average family size was 2.84.

In the township, the population was spread out, with 23.1% under the age of 18, 5.4% from 18 to 24, 25.3% from 25 to 44, 29.5% from 45 to 64, and 16.8% who were 65 years of age or older. The median age was 43 years. For every 100 females, there were 98.0 males. For every 100 females age 18 and over, there were 101.8 males.

The median income for a household in the township was $40,556, and the median income for a family was $48,333. Males had a median income of $34,688 versus $19,167 for females. The per capita income for the township was $17,493. About 3.2% of families and 3.9% of the population were below the poverty line, including 1.1% of those under age 18 and 7.5% of those age 65 or over.
