= Glendorado, Minnesota =

Unincorporated community in Minnesota, US

Glendorado
- Unincorporated community
- Location within Minnesota Location within the United States
- Coordinates: 45°34′41″N 93°46′11″W
- Country: United States
- State: Minnesota
- County: Benton
- Township: Glendorado Township
- Elevation: 1,030 ft (310 m)
- Time zone: UTC-6 (Central (CST))
  - Summer (DST): UTC-5 (CDT)
- ZIP code: 56329 and 55371
- Area codes: 320 and 763
- GNIS feature ID: 644180

Glendorado is an unincorporated community in Glendorado Township, Benton County, Minnesota, United States. The community is located near the junction of Benton County Roads 9 and 87, Glendorado Road. State Highway 95 (MN 95) is also in the immediate area. Nearby places include Foley, Princeton, and Santiago.
