= Melanie Benjamin (Ojibwe leader) =

Native American politician

- Occupations: Chief executive, Mille Lacs Band of Ojibwe
- Website: millelacsband.com/government/chief-executive

Melanie Benjamin is chief executive of the Mille Lacs Band of Ojibwe, a sovereign, federally-recognized American Indian tribal government in the Mille Lacs Indian Reservation in east-central Minnesota, USA.

== Biography ==
Benjamin was originally elected chief executive of the band in 2000, and re-elected in 2004 and 2008. In October 2008, shortly after the start of her third term, she was removed from office following accusations of misappropriation of tribal funds. She was again elected chief executive in 2012 and in 2016. In 2020, Benjamin was again re-elected by the citizens of the Mille Lacs Band of Ojibwe to her sixth consecutive four-year term. In 2018, Benjamin addressed the Band's opioid crisis and provided harsh comments to traditionally Band-supportive groups on their lack of assistance to the Tribe. In January 2024, Benjamin announced that she would not seek a seventh term in office.

== See also ==
- List of Native American politicians
- Native American women in politics

| Preceded by Marge Anderson | Chief Executive of the Mille Lacs Band of Ojibwe; 2012–present | Incumbent |
| Preceded by Marge Anderson | Chief Executive of the Mille Lacs Band of Ojibwe; 2000–2008 | Succeeded by Marge Anderson |
| Preceded by Chief of Staff to the Chairman of the Mille Lacs Band of Ojibwe | Commissioner of Administration of the Mille Lacs Band of Ojibwe; 1989-1997 | Succeeded by Cheryl Miller |
| Preceded by | Chief of Staff to the Chairman of the Mille Lacs Band of Ojibwe; 1986-1989 | Succeeded by Commissioner of Administration of the Mille Lacs Band of Ojibwe |
