= Hayland Township, Mille Lacs County, Minnesota =

Hayland Township, Minnesota
- Township
- Location within the state of Minnesota Hayland Township, Minnesota (the United States)
- Coordinates: 45°50′42″N 93°34′32″W
- Country: United States
- State: Minnesota
- County: Mille Lacs

Area
  - Total: 35.9 sq mi (93.1 km^{2})
  - Land: 35.9 sq mi (93.0 km^{2})
  - Water: 0.039 sq mi (0.1 km^{2})
- Elevation: 1,178 ft (359 m)

Population (2010)
  - Total: 501
  - Density: 14.0/sq mi (5.39/km^{2})
- Time zone: UTC-6 (Central (CST))
  - Summer (DST): UTC-5 (CDT)
- FIPS code: 27-27908
- GNIS feature ID: 0664427
- Website: https://www.haylandtownshipmn.org/

Hayland Township is a township in Mille Lacs County, Minnesota, United States. The population was 501 at the 2010 census.

Hayland Township was named for its hay production.

== Geography ==
According to the United States Census Bureau, the township has a total area of 36.0 square miles (93 km^{2}), of which 35.9 square miles (93 km^{2}) is land and 0.1 square miles (0.26 km^{2}), or 0.14%, is water.

== Demographics ==
As of the census of 2000, there were 490 people, 177 households, and 138 families residing in the township. The population density was 13.6 inhabitants per square mile (5.3/km^{2}). There were 215 housing units at an average density of 6.0 per square mile (2.3/km^{2}). The racial makeup of the township was 99.18% White, 0.20% Native American, 0.20% Asian, and 0.41% from two or more races. Hispanic or Latino of any race were 0.61% of the population.

There were 177 households, out of which 40.7% had children under the age of 18 living with them, 65.0% were married couples living together, 5.6% had a female householder with no husband present, and 22.0% were non-families. 19.8% of all households were made up of individuals, and 4.5% had someone living alone who was 65 years of age or older. The average household size was 2.77 and the average family size was 3.19.

In the township the population was spread out, with 31.0% under the age of 18, 4.7% from 18 to 24, 30.2% from 25 to 44, 23.7% from 45 to 64, and 10.4% who were 65 years of age or older. The median age was 36 years. For every 100 females, there were 105.0 males. For every 100 females age 18 and over, there were 106.1 males.

The median income for a household in the township was $35,446, and the median income for a family was $40,221. Males had a median income of $31,500 versus $16,818 for females. The per capita income for the township was $16,836. About 9.9% of families and 13.1% of the population were below the poverty line, including 21.1% of those under age 18 and 5.0% of those age 65 or over.
