= Page Township, Mille Lacs County, Minnesota =

Page Township, Minnesota
- Township
- Location within the state of Minnesota Page Township, Minnesota (the United States)
- Coordinates: 45°51′18″N 93°41′43″W
- Country: United States
- State: Minnesota
- County: Mille Lacs

Area
  - Total: 35.8 sq mi (92.8 km^{2})
  - Land: 35.5 sq mi (92.0 km^{2})
  - Water: 0.27 sq mi (0.7 km^{2})
- Elevation: 1,204 ft (367 m)

Population (2010)
  - Total: 743
  - Density: 20.9/sq mi (8.08/km^{2})
- Time zone: UTC-6 (Central (CST))
  - Summer (DST): UTC-5 (CDT)
- FIPS code: 27-49480
- GNIS feature ID: 0665248
- Website: www.PageTownship.org

Page Township is a township in Mille Lacs County, Minnesota, United States. The population was 743 at the 2010 census.

Page Township was named for Charles H. and Edwin S. Page, loggers.

== Geography ==
According to the United States Census Bureau, the township has a total area of 35.8 square miles (92.8 km^{2}), of which 35.5 square miles (92.0 km^{2}) is land and 0.27 square miles (0.7 km^{2}), or 0.81%, is water.

Page Township is located roughly 20 miles south of Lake Mille Lacs. It is approximately 40 miles northeast of St. Cloud and 75 miles north of Minneapolis. The Rum River flows for just over six miles through Page.

== Demographics ==
=== 2010 census ===
As of the census of 2010, there were 743 people. The population density was 20.8 people per square mile (8.0/km^{2}). There were 273 housing units at an average density of 7.6 per square mile (2.9/km^{2}). The racial makeup of the town was 96.6% White, 0.3% African American, 0.5% Native American, 0.0% Asian, 0.8% from other races, and 1.7% from two or more races. Hispanic or Latino of any race were 0.8% of the population.

There were 273 households, out of which 34.4% had children under the age of 18 living with them, 62.6% were married couples living together, 7.0% had a female householder with no husband present, 6.2% had a male householder with no wife present, and 24.2% were non-families. 17.2% of all households were made up of individuals, and 5.1% had someone living alone who was 65 years of age or older. The average household size was 2.72 and the average family size was 3.02.

The median age in the town was 39.6 years. 24.6% of residents were under the age of 18; 8.6% were between the ages of 18 and 24; 24.4% were from 25 to 44; 30.6% were from 45 to 64; and 11.8% were 65 years of age or older. The gender makeup of the town was 54.2% male and 45.8% female.

=== 2000 Census ===
As of the census of 2000, there were 600 people, 213 households, and 166 families residing in the township. The population density was 16.8 people per square mile (6.5/km^{2}). There were 238 housing units at an average density of 6.7/sq mi (2.6/km^{2}). The racial makeup of the township was 98.33% White, 0.33% Native American, 0.17% Asian, and 1.17% from two or more races. Hispanic or Latino of any race were 0.17% of the population.

There were 213 households, out of which 42.3% had children under the age of 18 living with them, 66.2% were married couples living together, 5.2% had a female householder with no husband present, and 21.6% were non-families. 20.2% of all households were made up of individuals, and 5.2% had someone living alone who was 65 years of age or older. The average household size was 2.82 and the average family size was 3.25.

In the township the population was spread out, with 32.7% under the age of 18, 6.2% from 18 to 24, 27.0% from 25 to 44, 25.5% from 45 to 64, and 8.7% who were 65 years of age or older. The median age was 37 years. For every 100 females, there were 111.3 males. For every 100 females age 18 and over, there were 113.8 males.

The median income for a household in the township was $45,556, and the median income for a family was $49,479. Males had a median income of $30,909 versus $24,375 for females. The per capita income for the township was $17,050. About 0.6% of families and 3.0% of the population were below the poverty line, including 2.6% of those under age 18 and 3.8% of those age 65 or over.

== Government ==
Like all Minnesota townships, Page Township is the most local unit of government for residents. The Town is governed by an elected three-member Board of Supervisors, Clerk, and Treasurer. Supervisors serve three year terms; Clerks and Treasurers serve two year terms. Township elections are held in March of each year.

The current Town Board consists of the following:

Title	Name	Last Elected	Term Expires
Chairperson	Jason Theisen	2017	2020
Supervisor	Jake Janski	2019	2022
Supervisor	VACANT	--	2021 (2020 Special)
Clerk	Kyle Weimann	2018	2020
Treasurer	Laura Murphy	2019	2021

Supervisors select a Chairperson among themselves at the annual reorganization meeting held in April of each year. Public meetings are held at the Page Town Hall on the third Monday of every month (if that is a holiday, they are held one week prior).
