= Mille Lacs Band of Ojibwe =

Federally recognized American Indian tribe in east-central Minnesota

Misi-zaaga'igani Anishinaabeg
- Tribal flag

- Mille Lacs Band of Ojibwe logo

Total population
- 4,302

Regions with significant populations
- United States (Minnesota)

Languages
- English, Ojibwe

Related ethnic groups
- White Earth Band, Leech Lake Band, Grand Portage Band, Bois Forte Band, Fond du Lac Band

The Mille Lacs Band of Ojibwe (Ojibwe: Misi-zaaga'igani Anishinaabeg), also known as the Mille Lacs Band of Chippewa Indians, is a federally recognized American Indian tribe in east-central Minnesota. The Band has 4,302 members as of 2012. Its homeland is the Mille Lacs Indian Reservation, consisting of District I (near Onamia), District II (near McGregor), District IIa (near Isle), and District III (near Hinckley).

The Mille Lacs Band is one of six members of the federally recognized Minnesota Chippewa Tribe, which they organized in 1934. The other members are the White Earth Band, Leech Lake Band, Grand Portage Band, Bois Forte Band, and Fond du Lac Band. "Chippewa" is commonly used in the United States to refer to Ojibwe people; the Mille Lacs Band prefers the term "Ojibwe."

== Clans ==
There are eight major doodem (or clan) types found among the Mille Lacs Band of Ojibwe. They are Bizhiw (Lynx), Makwa (Bear), Waabizheshi (Marten) Awaazisii (Bullhead), Ma'iingan (Wolf), Migizi (Bald Eagle), Name (Sturgeon) and Moozens (Little Moose).

The historic Mille Lacs Band of Mdewakanton Dakota was part of the historic Mille Lacs Indians. The Snake River Band of Isanti Dakota became part of the historic St. Croix Band of Lake Superior Chippewa, which is today known as the St. Croix Chippewa Indians of Minnesota. Due to some of these Dakota ancestry, Mille Lacs Band of Ojibwe have a high degree of Ma'iingan-doodem members.

== History ==
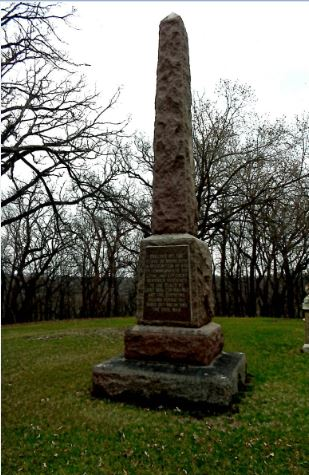
The State of Minnesota erected a monument to the Mille Lacs band at Fort Ridgely.

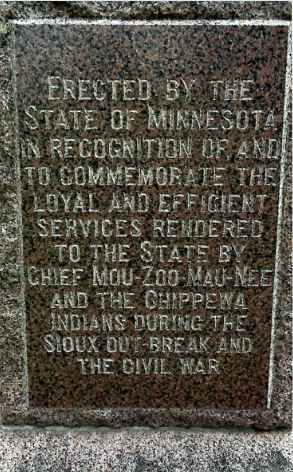
The monument to the Mille Lacs band was dedicated in 1914 at the Fort Ridgely site as it was frequented by the public. The Fort Ripley site was abandoned and unused so the monument was placed where it would be seen. It is the same size as the monument the state put up for troops of the 5th Minnesota that died at Fort Ridgely

According to oral history, the Ojibwe, an Algonquian language-speaking people, coalesced on the Atlantic coast of North America. About 500 years ago, the ancestors of the Mille Lacs Band began migrating west. This history has been confirmed by linguistic and archeological evidence.

After forcing the eastern Dakota from the area in the mid-1700s, the Ojibwe occupied the region around Mille Lacs Lake in what is today East Central Minnesota. They had a varied diet based on the resources of the area hunting deer, bear, moose, waterfowl, and small game; fishing the area's lakes and streams; gathering wild rice, maple syrup, nuts, and berries; and cultivating some herbs and plants.

The first Europeans who arrived among the Ojibwe were French, British, and American fur traders. Some stayed and later competed with the Band for resources and to encroach on their land. Many settlers chose to ignore and violate the treaties the Mille Lacs Band made with the British crown and the United States.

Like all Indigenous peoples, they suffered from exposure to infectious diseases the Anglo-Europeans brought, like measles, mumps, and smallpox. Many died as a result. By the end of the 19th century, only a few hundred Ojibwe remained on the Mille Lacs Reservation. At that time, pressing for their assimilation into European American culture, the Bureau of Indian Affairs prohibited the Ojibwe from practicing their religion. Many had converted to Catholicism while combining it with traditional prayer and rituals. Indian agents tried to have the native children sent to boarding schools and forced to learn and speak English, and virtually denied their right to govern themselves. Their traditional way of life was nearly impossible to follow.

When the Mdewakanton uprising broke out in 1862, Chief Hole in the Day made threats to take the North to war, too. On September 6, 1862, the speculation of his joining Little Crow prompted Zhaaboshkang(Shaw-bosh-kung), head chief of the Mille Lacs Band to lead 700–750 warriors waving a US flag and Mille Lacs made flag, to Fort Ripley to volunteer to fight the Sioux and support the garrison along with the Sandy Lake, Snake River, and Chippewa River bands. William P. Dole, the Indian Commissioner who happened to be at Fort Ripley, asked that they return to their reservation. He told them they would be informed if they were needed. Dole told the Mille Lacs chiefs that they could remain on their reservation for 1000 years for their actions. However, war chief Mou-Zoo-Mau-Nee, with 200 Mille Lacs warriors, remained at the fort, as did 100 from the Sandy Lake band.

According to Chief Mou-zoo-mau-nee's obituary, the people of Little Falls asked for protection. The town was 15 miles downriver from Fort Ripley. He sent 150 warriors. The town's woman prepared a welcome meal and the men smoked the peace pipe with the warriors.

On September 8, 1862, another Mille Lacs band chief with 100 warriors was met and stopped at Watab, Minnesota, just north of St Cloud. They wanted to join the government forces fighting the Sioux. Fort Ripley was informed, and Capt. Hall, the fort's commander, invited the Chippewa to come to the fort as guests of the State to await a decision on their offer. That same week, the Fond du Lac band sent a letter to Gov. Ramsey to forward to President Abraham Lincoln, offering to fight the Sioux. Also that week, the Red Lake band offered to fight, too. In both 1863 and 1864, Article 12 in two Chippewa treaties acknowledged the Mille Lacs band and Sandy Lake band for voluntarily providing security to a U.S. military installation and the civilian town without compensation during an ongoing war. For that service, Lincoln repeated what Commissioner Dole had said, the Mille Lacs band could remain on their reservation for 1,000 years.12 Stat. 1249

In 1864, 20 Mille Lacs warriors offered to scout for General Sibley's Dakota expedition. Sibley told them he already had some Ojibwe warriors and didn't need all 20, but he did accept a few. One of those scouts, Chief Kegg, became a historical figure in the Mille Lacs Band

In 1875, Chief Shaw-Bosh-Kung described his 1863 meeting with Lincoln when interviewed at the Chippewa Indian Agency:

"The President took our hands and promised us faithfully and encouraged us and he said we could live on our reservation for 10 years and if faithful to whites and behave ourselves [and are] friendly to whites you shall increase the number to 100 and you may increase it to 1,000 years if you are good Indians, and through your good behavior at the time of war (we were good and never raised our hands against the whites). The Secretary of the Interior and the President said that we should be considered good Indians and remain at Mille Lacs so long as we want.  Shaw-Bosh-Kung"[14]

The news of Shaw-Bosh-Kung's passing in 1890 made the newspapers across the state. A few months later papers across the country and overseas remembered his wit, wisdom, and leadership.

When Chief Mou-Zoo-Mau-Nee passed in 1897, the state legislature attempted to give his widow a pension, but it failed.

The State erected a granite monument to Chief Mou-Zoo-Mau-Nee and the Mille Lacs band at Fort Ridgely cemetery in 1914 for their service to the State at Fort Ripley and their offer to fight the Sioux.

Over the next century, Ojibwe/Chippewa bands in the Mille Lacs region struggled with poverty and despair. With the passage of the 1934 Indian Reorganization Act, the bands of the Mille Lacs region joined five others in forming the Minnesota Chippewa Tribe, organized 1934–1936. The four historic bands of the Mille Lacs region: Mille Lacs Indians, Sandy Lake Band, Rice Lake Band of Mississippi Chippewa, and Snake and Kettle River Bands of St. Croix Chippewa Indians of Minnesota were reorganized/combined as the Mille Lacs Band of Ojibwe.

In the early 1990s, the Band opened Grand Casino Mille Lacs and Grand Casino Hinckley. Since then, casino revenues have allowed the Mille Lacs Band to strengthen its cultural identity, return to economic self-sufficiency, rebuild its reservation, and increase the prosperity of the entire region.

== Tribal government ==
The Mille Lacs Band has a separation-of-powers form of government, making it one of the few Native American governments with three branches of government, similar to the government structure of the United States.

=== Executive branch ===
The current Chief Executive of the Mille Lacs Band of Ojibwe is Virgil Wind.

The Chief Executive, who is elected by Band members every four years, is the head of the executive branch and appoints commissioners who are ratified by the Band Assembly to oversee the various departments in the executive branch.

- Department of Justice, headed by the Solicitor General
  - Office of the Solicitor General
  - Office of Public Safety
    - Canine Registration
    - Child Passenger Safety Seat Program
    - Emergency Management
    - Project Jumpstart
    - Motor Vehicle Licensing
  - Tribal Police Department
    - Tribal Conservation Enforcement
  - Band-member Legal Aid
- Administration Department, headed by the Commissioner of Administration
  - Aanji-Bimaadizing
    - Career Development and Training
    - Adult and Youth Support Services
    - Gotaamigozi Flex Labor
    - Tribal Employment Rights Office (TERO)
    - Veterans and Veteran families Services
    - WiiDu Youth Activities
    - Youth Career and Work Exploration
  - Child Support Enforcement Program
  - Facilities
    - Neyaashiing Community Center
    - [new] Community Center
    - Chi-minising Community Center
    - Minisinaakwaang Community Center
    - Aazhoomog Community Center
    - Meshakwad Community Center at Gaa-zhiigwanaabikokaag
    - Urban Office
  - Grants Management
  - Human Resources
  - Information Services
  - Notary Services
  - Self-Governance
- Department of Community Development, headed by the Commissioner of Community Development
  - Facilities Maintenance
  - Housing Department
    - Housing Loans
    - Housing Maintenance
    - Resident Services
  - Project Management
  - Public Works Department
    - Planning and Zoning
    - Roads
    - Sanitation
    - Water and Sewer
- Corporate Commission, headed by the Commissioner of Corporate Affairs
  - Corporate Ventures
    - Maadaadizi Investments
    - Philanthropy
      - Adopt-a-School Program
      - Donation
    - Wewinabi, Inc.
- Department of Health and Human Services, headed by the Commissioner of Health and Human Services
  - Ne-Ia-Shing Clinic
  - District II Clinic Services
  - Aazhoomog Clinic
  - Public Health Department
  - Behavioral Health Services
  - Family Services
  - Community Support Services
- Department of Natural Resources, headed by the Commissioner of Natural Resources
  - Office of Natural Resource Management
    - Agriculture
      - Community Gardens
      - Wildrice Management
    - Land Management
    - Resource Management
      - Fisheries
      - Forestry
      - Licensing and Permitting
      - Wildland Maintenance
  - Office of the Environment
    - Air
    - Brownfield
    - Energy and Eco-systems
    - General Environmental Assistance
    - Water and Septic
  - Office of Culture
    - Cultural Resources
    - Enrollments
    - Tribal Historic Preservation Office
- Department of Education, headed by the Commissioner of Education
  - Nay Ah Shing School
    - Nay Ah Shing Lower School (Abinoojiiyag)
    - Nay Ah Shing Upper School
    - Pine Grove Leadership Academy
  - Minisinaakwaang Leadership Academy
  - Wewinabi Early Education
  - District I Cultural Immersion Program
  - District II East Lake Education Program
  - District III Aazhoomog Education Outreach Program
  - Community Youth Services
  - Higher Education
  - Library

=== Legislative branch ===
The legislative branch of the Band's government, known as the Band Assembly, consists of one Representative from each of the reservation's three districts and a Secretary/Treasurer who presides over the Band Assembly as its Speaker. Each Representative is elected by the people of his or her district to serve a four-year term in the Band Assembly. Band members who live off the reservation select a home district and vote only for a Representative from that district. The Secretary/Treasurer is elected by all Band members.

The current Secretary/Treasurer of the Mille Lacs Band of Ojibwe is Sheldon Boyd, Speaker of the Band Assembly elected in April 2018.

- Band Assembly
- Legislative Administration
- Office of Budget and Management, headed by the Commissioner of Finance, appointed by Band Assembly
  - Employee Payroll Services
  - Insurance Services
  - Revolving Loan Fund
  - Burial Insurance
  - Discretionary Loans
- Office of Revisor of Statutes

=== Judicial branch ===
The Chief Justice of the Mille Lacs Band of Ojibwe is Rhonda Sam. The judicial branch includes the Chief Justice and the Court of Central Jurisdiction, which consists of three appellate justices and one district judge.

- Tribal Court
- District Court Liaison Services

=== Independent Agencies ===
- Department of Athletic Regulation
- Gaming Regulatory Authority (GRA)
  - Office of Gaming Regulations & Compliance
    - Charitable Gaming
    - Compliance
    - Internal Audit
    - Licensing/Exclusions
    - Surveillance
    - Vendor Licensing

== Corporate Ventures Holdings ==
- Gaming
  - Grand Casino Hinckley, Hinckley, Minnesota
  - Grand Casino Mille Lacs, Vineland, Minnesota
- Circle Sage Property Management, Hinckley, Minnesota
  - Hinckley Medical Office Building, Hinckley, Minnesota
  - Hinckley Mill Place, Hinckley, Minnesota
  - Hinckley Lodge, Hinckley, Minnesota
  - Lady Luck Estates, Hinckley, Minnesota
  - Mille Lacs Corporate Ventures Headquarters Building, Vineland, Minnesota
  - Red Willow Estates, Onamia, Minnesota
  - Sugar Maple Crossing, Hinckley, Minnesota
- Maadaadizi Investments, Onamia, Minnesota (Hospitality)
  - Big Sandy Lodge & Resort, Libby, Minnesota
  - DoubleTree by Hilton Downtown Saint Paul, St. Paul, Minnesota
    - Citizen Modern American Cuisine and Bar, St. Paul, Minnesota
  - DoubleTree by Hilton Minneapolis Park Place, St. Louis Park, Minnesota
    - Dover Restaurant and Bar, St. Louis Park, Minnesota
  - Embassy Suites Will Rogers Airport Hotel, Oklahoma City, Oklahoma
  - InterContinental Saint Paul Riverfront, St. Paul, Minnesota
    - Rival House Sporting Parlour, St. Paul, Minnesota
  - Waybourne Hotel, Oklahoma City, Oklahoma
- Marketing & Technology
  - Foxtrot Marketing Group, New Brighton, Minnesota
    - Sweetgrass Media, Onamia, Minnesota
  - Makwa Global, LLC, Minneapolis, Minnesota (with offices in Duluth and Onamia, Minnesota; Reston, Virginia; Hawaii; Germany; Nairobi, Kenya; and Dubai, UAE)
- Wewinabi, Inc. (Local Businesses)
  - Crossroads Convenience Store, Lake Lena, Minnesota
  - East Lake Convenience Store, East Lake, Minnesota
  - Grand Makwa Cinema, Vineland, Minnesota
  - Grand Market, Vineland, Minnesota
  - Grindstone Laundry, Hinckley, Minnesota
  - Lake Leaf Cultivation, Vineland, Minnesota
    - Lake Leaf Dispensary, Hinckley, Minnesota
    - Lake Leaf Dispensary, Vineland, Minnesota
  - Mille Lacs Super Stop, Onamia, Minnesota
    - Taco John's franchise at Mille Lacs Super Stop
  - Mille Lacs Wastewater Management, Vineland, Minnesota
    - Garrison, Kathio, West Mille Lacs Lake Sanitary District (in cooperation with City of Garrison, Minnesota and Kathio Township)
  - Woodlands National Bank, Onamia, Minnesota (with branches in Cloquet, Minnesota; Hinckley, Minnesota; Minneapolis Minnesota; Sturgeon Lake, Minnesota, Vineland, Minnesota; and Zimmerman, Minnesota)

== List of Mille Lacs Band of Ojibwe Chiefs ==
=== Chairman ===
- 1936–1940: Fred Sam
- 1940–1948: Sam Yankee
- 1948–1956: Fred Jones
- 1956–1960: Jerry Martin
- 1960–1972: Sam Yankee
- 1972–1991: Arthur Gahbow
- 1991–1992: Marge Anderson (interim appointment)

=== Chief Executive ===
- 1992–2000: Marge Anderson
- 2000–2008: Melanie Benjamin
- 2008–2009: Herbert Weyaus (interim appointment)
- 2009–2012: Marge Anderson
- 2012–2024: Melanie Benjamin
- 2024–present: Virgil Wind.

== Notable members ==
- Marge Anderson
- James Clark, Naawigiizis
- Lucy Clark
- Melvin Eagle Miskwaanakwad
- Arthur Gahbow / Wewinabi ("Waywinabe")
- Virgil Hill, boxer
- Maude Kegg / Naawakamigookwe
- Larry Smallwood / Amikogaabaw
- Sam Yankee / Eshpan ("Ayshpun")

== See also ==
- Minnesota Chippewa Tribe
- Minnesota Indian Affairs Council
- United States v. Mille Lac Band of Chippewa Indians, 229 U.S. 498 (1913)
- Minnesota v. Mille Lacs Band of Chippewa Indians, 526 U.S. 127 (1999)
