= Marge Anderson =

Native American politician

- Born: Marjorie Ann Davis; April 21, 1932; Mille Lacs Reservation (located in central Minnesota, USA)
- Died: June 29, 2013 (aged 81); Onamia, Minnesota, USA
- Other name: Marjorie Ann Anderson
- Occupations: Elder, politician
- Years active: 1976-2012

Marjorie Ann "Marge" Anderson (née Davis; April 21, 1932 – June 29, 2013) was an Ojibwe Elder and politician for the Mille Lacs Band of Ojibwe, located in east-central Minnesota.

== Biography ==
Mille Lacs Band Elder Marge Anderson was born on the Mille Lacs Reservation, was fluent in the Ojibwe language, and had served more than 30 years in the Band's tribal government.

Anderson began her public service in 1976 as District I Representative. She then served as Secretary/Treasurer from 1987 to 1991 before being appointed Chairman of the Mille Lacs Band in 1991 after Arthur Gahbow died while in office. She was elected to the post in 1992 (with the post changing its title from Chairman to the Chief Executive) and elected again in 1996. In 2000 Melanie Benjamin replaced her as Chief Executive until December 2008, when Anderson won the post back in a special election. Then in 2012 Benjamin again won the post from her in another election. As the Chief Executive, Anderson was the first woman to lead the Mille Lacs Band of Ojibwe, and indeed the first woman to lead any Minnesota Indian tribe. During her tenure as Chief Executive, Anderson had led the development of Grand Casino Mille Lacs and Grand Casino Hinckley and the rebuilding of the reservation through new schools, clinics, community centers, housing, a water treatment plant, and other infrastructure. Her efforts to strengthen tribal self-governance and increase American Indians’ self-sufficiency had received national recognition. She died in the small Minnesota city of Onamia.

== See also ==
- List of Native American politicians
- Native American women in politics

Preceded by Melanie Benjamin	Chief Executive of the Mille Lacs Band of Ojibwe; 2008–2012	Succeeded by Melanie Benjamin
Preceded by Chairman of the Mille Lacs Band of Ojibwe	Chief Executive of the Mille Lacs Band of Ojibwe; 1992–1999	Succeeded by Melanie Benjamin
Preceded by	Secretary/Treasurer of the Mille Lacs Band of Ojibwe; 1987–1991	Succeeded by David Matrious
Preceded by	District I Representative for the Mille Lacs Band of Ojibwe; 1976–1986	Succeeded by
