= Borgholm Township, Mille Lacs County, Minnesota =

Borgholm Township, Minnesota
- Township
- Location within the state of Minnesota Borgholm Township, Minnesota (the United States)
- Coordinates: 45°46′28″N 93°34′57″W
- Country: United States
- State: Minnesota
- County: Mille Lacs

Area
  - Total: 35.0 sq mi (90.6 km^{2})
  - Land: 35.0 sq mi (90.6 km^{2})
  - Water: 0 sq mi (0.0 km^{2})
- Elevation: 1,102 ft (336 m)

Population (2010)
  - Total: 1,718
  - Density: 49.1/sq mi (19.0/km^{2})
- Time zone: UTC-6 (Central (CST))
  - Summer (DST): UTC-5 (CDT)
- FIPS code: 27-07012
- GNIS feature ID: 0663634

Borgholm Township is a township in Mille Lacs County, Minnesota, United States. The population was 1,718 at the 2010 census.

Borgholm Township was named after Borgholm, in Sweden.

== Geography ==
According to the United States Census Bureau, the township has a total area of 35.0 square miles (91 km^{2}), all land.

== Demographics ==
As of the census of 2000, there were 1,140 people, 397 households, and 323 families residing in the township. The population density was 32.6 inhabitants per square mile (12.6/km^{2}). There were 418 housing units at an average density of 12.0 per square mile (4.6/km^{2}). The racial makeup of the township was 98.42% White, 0.18% Native American, 0.26% Asian, 0.26% from other races, and 0.88% from two or more races. Hispanic or Latino of any race were 0.18% of the population.

There were 397 households, out of which 40.3% had children under the age of 18 living with them, 69.8% were married couples living together, 6.8% had a female householder with no husband present, and 18.6% were non-families. 15.4% of all households were made up of individuals, and 5.0% had someone living alone who was 65 years of age or older. The average household size was 2.87 and the average family size was 3.17.

In the township the population was spread out, with 30.8% under the age of 18, 6.7% from 18 to 24, 30.2% from 25 to 44, 23.2% from 45 to 64, and 9.1% who were 65 years of age or older. The median age was 36 years. For every 100 females, there were 115.1 males. For every 100 females age 18 and over, there were 111.5 males.

The median income for a household in the township was $43,393, and the median income for a family was $49,250. Males had a median income of $35,057 versus $26,125 for females. The per capita income for the township was $15,778. About 8.7% of families and 10.4% of the population were below the poverty line, including 8.0% of those under age 18 and 17.5% of those age 65 or over.
