= Maude Kegg =

Ojibwe artist, storyteller, and author from Minnesota, U.S. (1904–1996)

- Naawakamigookwe
- Born: Maude Ellen Mitchell; August 26, 1904; Crow Wing County, Minnesota, U.S.
- Died: January 6, 1996 (aged 91); Minnesota, U.S.
- Citizenship: Mille Lacs Band of the Minnesota Chippewa Tribe.
- Known for: Beadwork, storytelling
- Notable work: When I Was a Little Girl (1976), At the End of the Trail (1978), What My Grandmother Told Me (1983), Portage Lake: Memories of an Ojibwe Childhood (1991)
- Awards: National Heritage Fellowship (1990)

Maude Kegg (1904–1996) was an Ojibwa writer, folk artist, and cultural interpreter from Minnesota. She was a citizen of the Mille Lacs Band of the Minnesota Chippewa Tribe.

== Name ==
She was born Maude Ellen Mitchell. Her Ojibwa name Naawakamigookwe, meaning "Middle of the Earth Lady" or "Centered upon the Ground Woman".

== Early life ==
Maude Mitchell was born in a dark wigwam in August of 1904 in Crow Wing County, Minnesota, near Portage Lake, a few miles northwest of Mille Lacs Lake. Her parents were Charles Mitchell, a member of the non-Removable Mille Lacs Indians of the Adik-doodem, and his wife, Nancy Pine. Maude was named after her maternal uncle Gichi-Mizko-giizhig, otherwise known as George Pine. As a child she lived with her aunts Mary and Sara Pine, her father, her grandmother and her grandmother's brother, and her uncle and his wife.

Due to the death of her mother in childbirth, Maude Mitchell was raised by her maternal grandmother, Margaret Pine, (also known in Ojibwe as Aakogwan).

She learned English from her aunts and white neighbors at an early age.

During the winter her family would live in a house, but otherwise followed the traditional seasonal cycle of the Minnesota Anishinaabeg. In the spring they would move to iskigamiziganing, or the sugar bush. In summer they set camp by the wild rice fields. They travelled by foot, horse, or birch bark canoes.

Kegg chose her own birthdate as August 26 since the exact date of her birth was not known.

She finished eighth grade at the local county Esdon school, and was the only Native child to attend the school.

She met farm worker Martin Kegg at a Midewiwin ceremony in 1917. They married in 1920 in a traditional Indian manner, and again in 1922 in a church ceremony. They moved in 1942 to Shah-bush-kung Point on Mille Lacs with their children, and again in 1960 to a point more inland. Martin Kegg died in 1968. Together they had eleven children.

== Career ==
In 1968 Kegg began working as a guide at the Trading Post and Museum, which is now part of the Minnesota Historical Society.

Kegg herself was not a writer but rather dictated her stories to others, notably John D. Nichols, who transcribed the stories into both English and Ojibwe. In "Portage Lake" Kegg relates her memories from her childhood working with her female relatives.

She preserved many traditions of the Ojibwe from agricultural techniques, such as how to harvest and process wild rice of the northern lake area and maple sugaring. She was one of the last masters of the Ojibwe language and contributed special Ojibwe terms and language data to linguists, especially in the form of the Concise Dictionary of Minnesota Ojibwe, published in 1995.

Kegg worked for the Minnesota Historical Society at Mille Lacs for many years. She acted as a docent and tour guide, and helped create a large diorama of Ojibwe seasonal life, making every artifact in the exhibit.

She was exceptionally skilled in beadwork, and was a master of Ojibwe floral designs and geometric loom beadwork techniques. She was able to create fully beaded traditional bandolier bags, which were commonly worn by tribal leaders.

She has shown pieces in the Smithsonian Institution's craft collection. The American Federation of Arts touring exhibition "Lost and Found: Native American Art, 1965-1985." showcased one of her beaded bandoliers.

== Awards and honors ==
- Minnesota Governor Rudy Perpich honored her by declaring August 26, 1986, as "Maude Kegg Day" for the State of Minnesota.
- In 1990, she was awarded a National Heritage Fellowship from the National Endowment for the Arts in recognition of her effort to preserve Ojibwe language, traditions, stories, culture, and crafts.

== Death ==
She died on January 6, 1996, at age 91.

== Bibliography ==
- Gabekanaansing = At the end of the trail: memories of Chippewa childhood in Minnesota with texts in Ojibwe and English. University of Northern Colorado (Greeley, CO: 1978).
- Nookomis Gaa-Inaajimotawid: What My Grandmother Told Me with texts in Ojibwe (Chippewa) and English. Bemidji State University (Bemidji, MN: 1990).
- Ojibwewi-Ikidowinan: An Ojibwe Word Resource Book. Minnesota Archaeological Society (St. Paul, MN: 1979). Edited by John Nichols and Earl Nyholm.
- Portage Lake: memories of an Ojibwe childhood. University of Minnesota Press (Minneapolis: 1993).

== See also ==
- List of Native American artists
- List of Native American writers
- Visual arts by indigenous peoples of the Americas
