= Onamia Township, Mille Lacs County, Minnesota =

Onamia Township, Minnesota
- Township
- Location within the state of Minnesota Onamia Township, Minnesota (the United States)
- Coordinates: 46°1′5″N 93°38′30″W
- Country: United States
- State: Minnesota
- County: Mille Lacs

Area
  - Total: 36.1 sq mi (93.6 km^{2})
  - Land: 35.7 sq mi (92.5 km^{2})
  - Water: 0.42 sq mi (1.1 km^{2})
- Elevation: 1,266 ft (386 m)

Population (2010)
  - Total: 575
  - Density: 16.1/sq mi (6.22/km^{2})
- Time zone: UTC-6 (Central (CST))
  - Summer (DST): UTC-5 (CDT)
- ZIP code: 56359
- Area code: 320
- FIPS code: 27-48328
- GNIS feature ID: 0665210

Onamia Township is a township in Mille Lacs County, Minnesota, United States. The population was 575 at the 2010 census.

== Geography ==
According to the United States Census Bureau, the township has a total area of 36.1 square miles (93.6 km^{2}), of which 35.7 square miles (92.5 km^{2}) is land and 0.42 square miles (1.1 km^{2}), or 1.13%, is water.

== Demographics ==
As of the census of 2000, there were 583 people, 218 households, and 163 families residing in the township. The population density was 16.2 people per square mile (6.3/km^{2}). There were 258 housing units at an average density of 7.2/sq mi (2.8/km^{2}). The racial makeup of the township was 96.05% White, 2.57% Native American, 0.34% from other races, and 1.03% from two or more races. Hispanic or Latino of any race were 1.20% of the population.

There were 218 households, out of which 35.8% had children under the age of 18 living with them, 61.5% were married couples living together, 10.6% had a female householder with no husband present, and 24.8% were non-families. 18.8% of all households were made up of individuals, and 7.3% had someone living alone who was 65 years of age or older. The average household size was 2.67 and the average family size was 3.02.

In the township the population was spread out, with 27.6% under the age of 18, 8.1% from 18 to 24, 29.8% from 25 to 44, 21.8% from 45 to 64, and 12.7% who were 65 years of age or older. The median age was 38 years. For every 100 females, there were 112.0 males. For every 100 females age 18 and over, there were 103.9 males.

The median income for a household in the township was $33,889, and the median income for a family was $41,786. Males had a median income of $26,458 versus $19,318 for females. The per capita income for the township was $15,735. About 10.5% of families and 14.4% of the population were below the poverty line, including 19.8% of those under age 18 and 3.2% of those age 65 or over.
