= Princeton Township, Mille Lacs County, Minnesota =

Princeton Township, Minnesota
- Township
- Location within the state of Minnesota Princeton Township, Minnesota (the United States)
- Coordinates: 45°35′52″N 93°34′5″W
- Country: United States
- State: Minnesota
- County: Mille Lacs

Area
  - Total: 32.5 sq mi (84.1 km^{2})
  - Land: 31.7 sq mi (82.2 km^{2})
  - Water: 0.73 sq mi (1.9 km^{2})
- Elevation: 961 ft (293 m)

Population (2010)
  - Total: 2,256
  - Density: 71.1/sq mi (27.4/km^{2})
- Time zone: UTC-6 (Central (CST))
  - Summer (DST): UTC-5 (CDT)
- ZIP code: 55371
- Area code: 763
- FIPS code: 27-52540
- GNIS feature ID: 0665358
- Website: https://princetontownshipmn.us/

Princeton Township is a township in Mille Lacs County, Minnesota, United States. The population was 2,256 at the 2010 census.

Princeton Township was established in 1857.

== Geography ==
According to the United States Census Bureau, the township has a total area of 32.5 square miles (84.1 km^{2}), of which 31.7 square miles (82.2 km^{2}) is land and 0.73 square miles (1.9 km^{2}), or 2.23%, is water.

== Demographics ==
As of the census of 2000, there were 1,947 people, 693 households, and 553 families residing in the township. The population density was 59.8 inhabitants per square mile (23.1/km^{2}). There were 709 housing units at an average density of 21.8/sq mi (8.4/km^{2}). The racial makeup of the township was 97.64% White, 0.21% African American, 0.41% Native American, 0.46% Asian, 0.05% Pacific Islander, 0.15% from other races, and 1.08% from two or more races. Hispanic or Latino of any race were 0.67% of the population.

There were 693 households, out of which 36.5% had children under the age of 18 living with them, 68.7% were married couples living together, 5.9% had a female householder with no husband present, and 20.1% were non-families. 15.3% of all households were made up of individuals, and 5.9% had someone living alone who was 65 years of age or older. The average household size was 2.81 and the average family size was 3.10.

In the township the population was spread out, with 27.4% under the age of 18, 7.9% from 18 to 24, 30.8% from 25 to 44, 23.5% from 45 to 64, and 10.5% who were 65 years of age or older. The median age was 37 years. For every 100 females, there were 104.1 males. For every 100 females age 18 and over, there were 105.5 males.

The median income for a household in the township was $52,083, and the median income for a family was $53,200. Males had a median income of $37,788 versus $22,287 for females. The per capita income for the township was $20,737. About 4.7% of families and 4.7% of the population were below the poverty line, including 3.7% of those under age 18 and 3.5% of those age 65 or over.
