= East Side Township, Mille Lacs County, Minnesota =

East Side Township, Minnesota
- Township
- Location within the state of Minnesota East Side Township, Minnesota (the United States)
- Coordinates: 46°11′57″N 93°29′27″W
- Country: United States
- State: Minnesota
- County: Mille Lacs

Area
  - Total: 38.1 sq mi (98.8 km^{2})
  - Land: 21.4 sq mi (55.4 km^{2})
  - Water: 16.8 sq mi (43.4 km^{2})
- Elevation: 1,260 ft (384 m)

Population (2010)
  - Total: 620
  - Density: 29/sq mi (11/km^{2})
- Time zone: UTC-6 (Central (CST))
  - Summer (DST): UTC-5 (CDT)
- ZIP code: 56342
- Area code: 320
- FIPS code: 27-17810
- GNIS feature ID: 0664034

East Side Township is a township in Mille Lacs County, Minnesota, United States. The population was 620 at the 2010 census.

East Side Township was named for its location east of Mille Lacs Lake.

== Geography ==
According to the United States Census Bureau, the township has a total area of 38.1 square miles (99 km^{2}), of which 21.4 square miles (55 km^{2}) is land and 16.8 square miles (44 km^{2}), or 43.92%, is water.

== Demographics ==
As of the census of 2000, there were 731 people, 340 households, and 229 families residing in the township. The population density was 34.2 inhabitants per square mile (13.2/km^{2}). There were 766 housing units at an average density of 35.8 per square mile (13.8/km^{2}). The racial makeup of the township was 97.40% White, 0.27% African American, 0.96% Native American, 0.14% Pacific Islander, and 1.23% from two or more races. Hispanic or Latino of any race were 1.50% of the population.

There were 340 households, out of which 19.4% had children under the age of 18 living with them, 60.3% were married couples living together, 4.1% had a female householder with no husband present, and 32.4% were non-families. 27.4% of all households were made up of individuals, and 12.4% had someone living alone who was 65 years of age or older. The average household size was 2.15 and the average family size was 2.57.

In the township the population was spread out, with 17.1% under the age of 18, 4.2% from 18 to 24, 23.0% from 25 to 44, 27.9% from 45 to 64, and 27.8% who were 65 years of age or older. The median age was 50 years. For every 100 females, there were 107.1 males. For every 100 females age 18 and over, there were 110.4 males.

The median income for a household in the township was $36,875, and the median income for a family was $41,806. Males had a median income of $32,132 versus $31,250 for females. The per capita income for the township was $18,937. About 3.9% of families and 9.2% of the population were below the poverty line, including 16.0% of those under age 18 and 4.4% of those age 65 or over.
