= Mudgett Township, Mille Lacs County, Minnesota =

Mudgett Township, Minnesota
- Township
- Location within the state of Minnesota Mudgett Township, Minnesota (the United States)
- Coordinates: 45°57′14″N 93°35′7″W
- Country: United States
- State: Minnesota
- County: Mille Lacs

Area
  - Total: 30.2 sq mi (78.3 km^{2})
  - Land: 30.2 sq mi (78.1 km^{2})
  - Water: 0.077 sq mi (0.2 km^{2})
- Elevation: 1,217 ft (371 m)

Population (2010)
  - Total: 84
  - Density: 2.8/sq mi (1.1/km^{2})
- Time zone: UTC-6 (Central (CST))
  - Summer (DST): UTC-5 (CDT)
- FIPS code: 27-44710
- GNIS feature ID: 0665061

Mudgett Township is a township in Mille Lacs County, Minnesota, United States. The population was 84 at the 2010 census.

Mudgett Township was organized in 1916, and named for Isaiah S. Mudgett, a county official.

== Geography ==
According to the United States Census Bureau, the township has a total area of 30.2 square miles (78.3 km^{2}), of which 30.1 square miles (78.1 km^{2}) is land and 0.1 square miles (0.2 km^{2}), or 0.30%, is water.

== Demographics ==
As of the census of 2000, there were 85 people, 35 households, and 26 families residing in the township. The population density was 2.8 people per square mile (1.1/km^{2}). There were 47 housing units at an average density of 1.6/sq mi (0.6/km^{2}). The racial makeup of the township was 98.82% White, and 1.18% from two or more races.

There were 35 households, out of which 28.6% had children under the age of 18 living with them, 62.9% were married couples living together, 8.6% had a female householder with no husband present, and 25.7% were non-families. 25.7% of all households were made up of individuals, and 5.7% had someone living alone who was 65 years of age or older. The average household size was 2.43 and the average family size was 2.92.

In the township the population was spread out, with 22.4% under the age of 18, 7.1% from 18 to 24, 28.2% from 25 to 44, 31.8% from 45 to 64, and 10.6% who were 65 years of age or older. The median age was 35 years. For every 100 females, there were 123.7 males. For every 100 females age 18 and over, there were 112.9 males.

The median income for a household in the township was $67,917, and the median income for a family was $69,167. Males had a median income of $32,500 versus $20,972 for females. The per capita income for the township was $17,937. None of the population or the families were below the poverty line.
