= Milaca Township, Mille Lacs County, Minnesota =

Milaca Township, Minnesota
- Township
- Location within the state of Minnesota Milaca Township, Minnesota (the United States)
- Coordinates: 45°46′41″N 93°41′0″W
- Country: United States
- State: Minnesota
- County: Mille Lacs

Area
  - Total: 32.7 sq mi (84.7 km^{2})
  - Land: 32.5 sq mi (84.1 km^{2})
  - Water: 0.27 sq mi (0.7 km^{2})
- Elevation: 1,112 ft (339 m)

Population (2010)
  - Total: 1,617
  - Density: 49.8/sq mi (19.2/km^{2})
- Time zone: UTC-6 (Central (CST))
  - Summer (DST): UTC-5 (CDT)
- ZIP code: 56353
- Area code: 320
- FIPS code: 27-42128
- GNIS feature ID: 0664971

Milaca Township is a township in Mille Lacs County, Minnesota, United States. The population was 1,617 at the 2010 census.

Milaca is a truncated form of Mille Lacs Lake.

== Geography ==
According to the United States Census Bureau, the township has a total area of 32.7 square miles (84.7 km^{2}), of which 32.5 square miles (84.1 km^{2}) is land and 0.27 square miles (0.7 km^{2}), or 0.77%, is water.

== Demographics ==
At the 2000 census, there were 1,189 people, 411 households and 334 families residing in the township. The population density was 36.1 inhabitants per square mile (13.9/km^{2}). There were 427 housing units at an average density of 13.0/sq mi (5.0/km^{2}). The racial makeup of the township was 98.65% White, 0.34% African American, 0.25% Asian, 0.25% from other races, and 0.50% from two or more races. Hispanic or Latino of any race were 0.50% of the population.

There were 411 households, of which 41.6% had children under the age of 18 living with them, 74.0% were married couples living together, 3.4% had a female householder with no husband present, and 18.5% were non-families. 15.1% of all households were made up of individuals, and 7.1% had someone living alone who was 65 years of age or older. The average household size was 2.89 and the average family size was 3.20.

Age distribution was 30.7% under the age of 18, 5.9% from 18 to 24, 29.2% from 25 to 44, 23.3% from 45 to 64, and 10.9% who were 65 years of age or older. The median age was 36 years. For every 100 females, there were 106.1 males. For every 100 females age 18 and over, there were 106.5 males.

The median household income was $45,313, and the median family income was $50,074. Males had a median income of $32,356 versus $24,583 for females. The per capita income for the township was $17,403. About 3.2% of families and 4.5% of the population were below the poverty line, including 2.0% of those under age 18 and 14.2% of those age 65 or over.
