= South Harbor Township, Mille Lacs County, Minnesota =

South Harbor Township, Minnesota
- Township
- Location within the state of Minnesota South Harbor Township, Minnesota (the United States)
- Coordinates: 46°6′30″N 93°37′12″W
- Country: United States
- State: Minnesota
- County: Mille Lacs

Area
  - Total: 75.1 sq mi (194.4 km^{2})
  - Land: 21.6 sq mi (56.0 km^{2})
  - Water: 53.4 sq mi (138.4 km^{2})
- Elevation: 1,250 ft (381 m)

Population (2010)
  - Total: 800
  - Density: 37/sq mi (14/km^{2})
- Time zone: UTC-6 (Central (CST))
  - Summer (DST): UTC-5 (CDT)
- FIPS code: 27-61384
- GNIS feature ID: 0665652
- Website: https://southharbortownship.com/

South Harbor Township is a township in Mille Lacs County, Minnesota, United States. The population was 800 at the 2010 census.

== History ==
South Harbor Township was named for its location south of Mille Lacs Lake.

== Geography ==
According to the United States Census Bureau, the township has a total area of 75.1 square miles (194.4 km^{2}), of which 21.6 square miles (56.0 km^{2}) is land and 53.4 square miles (138.4 km^{2}), or 71.20%, is water.

== Demographics ==
At the 2000 census, there were 885 people, 364 households and 266 families residing in the township. The population density was 41.5 inhabitants per square mile (16.0/km^{2}). There were 694 housing units at an average density of 32.6 per square mile (12.6/km^{2}). The racial makeup of the township was 88.70% White, 0.90% African American, 7.57% Native American, 0.34% Asian, and 2.49% from two or more races. Hispanic or Latino of any race were 1.36% of the population.

There were 364 households, of which 25.5% had children under the age of 18 living with them, 58.8% were married couples living together, 9.1% had a female householder with no husband present, and 26.9% were non-families. 21.2% of all households were made up of individuals, and 9.6% had someone living alone who was 65 years of age or older. The average household size was 2.43 and the average family size was 2.76.

24.6% of the population were under the age of 18, 5.4% from 18 to 24, 22.9% from 25 to 44, 28.5% from 45 to 64, and 18.5% who were 65 years of age or older. The median age was 44 years. For every 100 females, there were 98.0 males. For every 100 females age 18 and over, there were 102.1 males.

The median household income was $36,058 and the median family income was $42,500. Males had a median income of $35,909 compared with $19,583 for females. The per capita income was $19,742. About 7.5% of families and 10.6% of the population were below the poverty line, including 22.0% of those under age 18 and 1.9% of those age 65 or over.
