= Foreston, Minnesota =

City in Minnesota, United States

- City
- Location in Mille Lacs County and the state of Minnesota
- Coordinates: 45°44′12″N 93°42′33″W
- Country: United States
- State: Minnesota
- County: Mille Lacs

Government
  - Mayor: Thomas Longfield
  - Treasurer: Muriel Boyer
  - Clerk: Rebecca Haugen

Area
  - Total: 1.44 sq mi (3.73 km^{2})
  - Land: 1.43 sq mi (3.71 km^{2})
  - Water: 0.0077 sq mi (0.02 km^{2})
- Elevation: 1,093 ft (333 m)

Population (2020)
  - Total: 559
  - Density: 390.2/sq mi (150.67/km^{2})
- Time zone: UTC-6 (Central (CST))
  - Summer (DST): UTC-5 (CDT)
- ZIP code: 56330
- Area code: 320
- FIPS code: 27-21824
- GNIS feature ID: 0643815

Foreston is a city in Mille Lacs County, Minnesota, United States. The population was 559 at the 2020 census.

== History ==
A post office called Foreston has been in operation since 1889. The city was named for the forests near the original town site.

== Geography ==
Foreston is in southwestern Mille Lacs County, 3 miles (5 km) southwest of Milaca, the county seat. Minnesota Highway 23 serves as the main route in the community, leading northeast to Milaca and southwest 26 miles (42 km) to St. Cloud.

According to the U.S. Census Bureau, Foreston has a total area of 1.44 square miles (3.73 km^{2}), of which 0.01 square miles (0.03 km^{2}), or 0.62%, are water. The West Branch of the Rum River, a south-flowing tributary of the Mississippi River, flows through the northern part of the city.

=== Transportation ===
- MN 23
- Mille Lacs County Road 14
- Mille Lacs County Road 18

== Demographics ==
Historical population
Census	Pop.	Note	%±
1890	287		—
1900	263		−8.4%
1910	204		−22.4%
1920	328		60.8%
1930	280		−14.6%
1940	300		7.1%
1950	301		0.3%
1960	266		−11.6%
1970	273		2.6%
1980	283		3.7%
1990	354		25.1%
2000	389		9.9%
2010	533		37.0%
2020	559		4.9%
U.S. Decennial Census

=== 2010 census ===
As of the census of 2010, there were 533 people, 202 households, and 135 families residing in the city. The population density was 375.4 inhabitants per square mile (144.9/km^{2}). There were 213 housing units at an average density of 150.0 per square mile (57.9/km^{2}). The racial makeup of the city was 96.2% White, 1.1% Native American, 0.8% Asian, 0.2% from other races, and 1.7% from two or more races. Hispanic or Latino of any race were 1.7% of the population.

There were 202 households, of which 37.1% had children under the age of 18 living with them, 49.5% were married couples living together, 10.4% had a female householder with no husband present, 6.9% had a male householder with no wife present, and 33.2% were non-families. 23.8% of all households were made up of individuals, and 5.5% had someone living alone who was 65 years of age or older. The average household size was 2.64 and the average family size was 3.06.

The median age in the city was 31.3 years. 28.1% of residents were under the age of 18; 8.8% were between the ages of 18 and 24; 33.1% were from 25 to 44; 21.9% were from 45 to 64; and 8.1% were 65 years of age or older. The gender makeup of the city was 52.0% male and 48.0% female.

=== 2000 census ===
As of the census of 2000, there were 389 people, 145 households, and 95 families residing in the city. The population density was 270.7 inhabitants per square mile (104.5/km^{2}). There were 148 housing units at an average density of 103.0 per square mile (39.8/km^{2}). The racial makeup of the city was 99.74% White, 0.26% from other races. Hispanic or Latino of any race were 0.51% of the population.

There were 145 households, out of which 36.6% had children under the age of 18 living with them, 52.4% were married couples living together, 9.0% had a female householder with no husband present, and 33.8% were non-families. 24.1% of all households were made up of individuals, and 12.4% had someone living alone who was 65 years of age or older. The average household size was 2.68 and the average family size was 3.26.

In the city, the population was spread out, with 29.6% under the age of 18, 11.1% from 18 to 24, 32.4% from 25 to 44, 17.5% from 45 to 64, and 9.5% who were 65 years of age or older. The median age was 31 years. For every 100 females, there were 122.3 males. For every 100 females age 18 and over, there were 124.6 males.

The median income for a household in the city was $37,500, and the median income for a family was $45,625. Males had a median income of $30,625 versus $26,071 for females. The per capita income for the city was $16,666. 5.7% of the population and 1.0% of families were below the poverty line. 3.5% of those under the age of 18 and 14.6% of those 65 and older were living below the poverty line.
