= Greenbush Township, Mille Lacs County, Minnesota =

Greenbush Township, Minnesota
- Township
- Location within the state of Minnesota Greenbush Township, Minnesota (the United States)
- Coordinates: 45°36′14″N 93°41′19″W
- Country: United States
- State: Minnesota
- County: Mille Lacs

Area
  - Total: 37.2 sq mi (96.4 km^{2})
  - Land: 37.1 sq mi (96.0 km^{2})
  - Water: 0.15 sq mi (0.4 km^{2})
- Elevation: 1,020 ft (311 m)

Population (2010)
  - Total: 1,293
  - Density: 34.9/sq mi (13.5/km^{2})
- Time zone: UTC-6 (Central (CST))
  - Summer (DST): UTC-5 (CDT)
- FIPS code: 27-25586
- GNIS feature ID: 0664336
- Website: https://www.greenbushtwp.com/

Greenbush Township is a township in Mille Lacs County, Minnesota, United States. The population was 1,293 at the 2010 census.

Greenbush Township was organized in 1869, and named after Greenbush, Maine.

== Geography ==
According to the United States Census Bureau, the township has a total area of 37.2 square miles (96.4 km^{2}), of which 37.1 square miles (96.0 km^{2}) is land and 0.15 square miles (0.4 km^{2}), or 0.45%, is water.

== Demographics ==
As of the census of 2000, there were 1,135 people, 391 households, and 317 families residing in the township. The population density was 30.5 inhabitants per square mile (11.8/km^{2}). There were 406 housing units at an average density of 10.9 per square mile (4.2/km^{2}). The racial makeup of the township was 96.92% White, 0.35% African American, 0.35% Native American, 0.09% Asian, 0.79% from other races, and 1.50% from two or more races. Hispanic or Latino of any race were 2.20% of the population.

There were 391 households, out of which 37.9% had children under the age of 18 living with them, 68.3% were married couples living together, 7.4% had a female householder with no husband present, and 18.9% were non-families. 13.8% of all households were made up of individuals, and 4.3% had someone living alone who was 65 years of age or older. The average household size was 2.90 and the average family size was 3.20.

In the township the population was spread out, with 28.6% under the age of 18, 7.4% from 18 to 24, 29.0% from 25 to 44, 26.1% from 45 to 64, and 8.9% who were 65 years of age or older. The median age was 37 years. For every 100 females, there were 117.9 males. For every 100 females age 18 and over, there were 114.9 males.

The median income for a household in the township was $52,452, and the median income for a family was $54,583. Males had a median income of $35,192 versus $24,408 for females. The per capita income for the township was $21,843. About 4.9% of families and 7.1% of the population were below the poverty line, including 5.5% of those under age 18 and 9.6% of those age 65 or over.
