= Milaca, Minnesota =

City in Minnesota, United States

- City
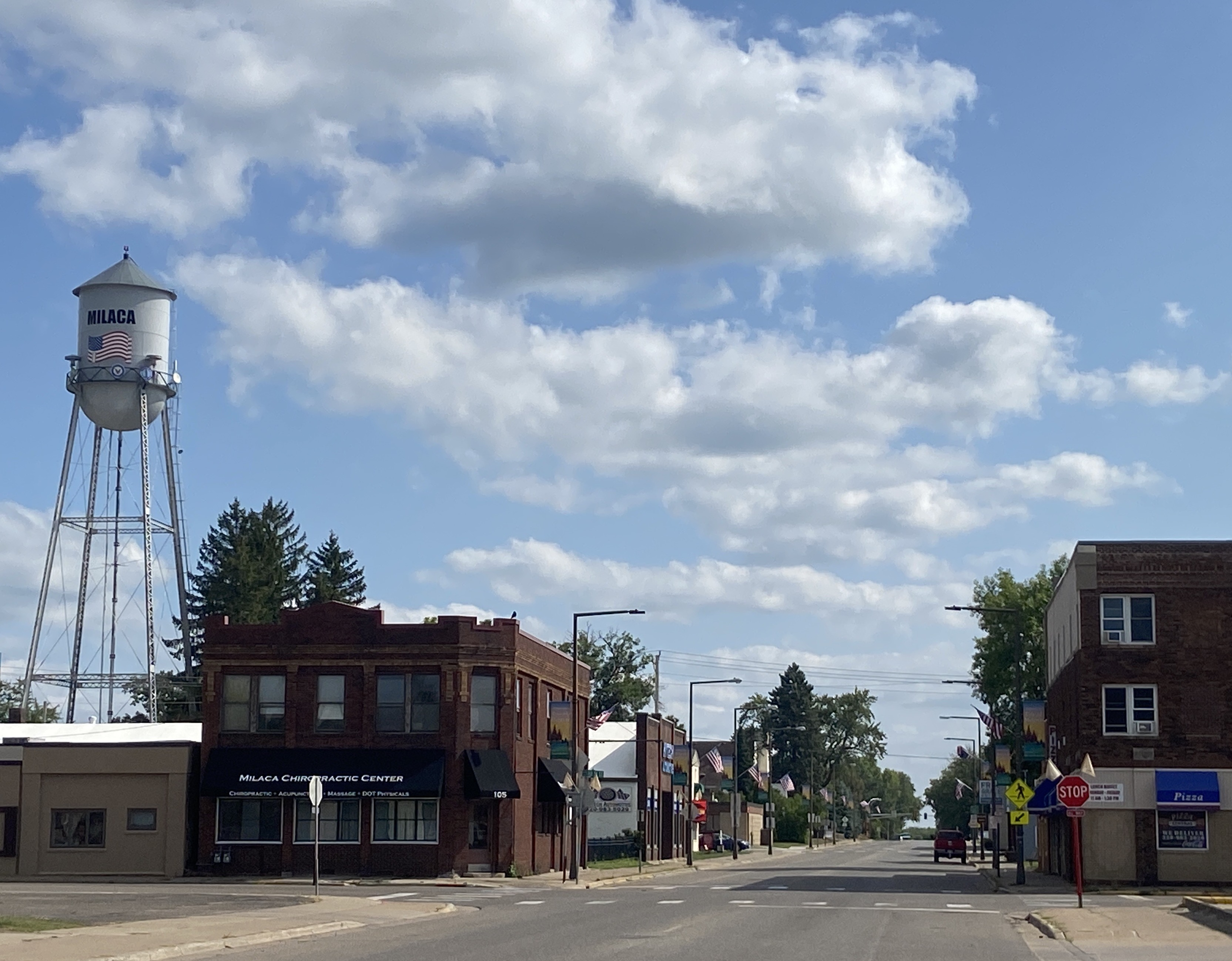
- 1st Street W. and Central Avenue

- Location in Mille Lacs County and the state of Minnesota
- Coordinates: 45°45′24″N 93°39′5″W
- Country: United States
- State: Minnesota
- County: Mille Lacs

Area
  - Total: 3.55 sq mi (9.20 km^{2})
  - Land: 3.35 sq mi (8.67 km^{2})
  - Water: 0.20 sq mi (0.53 km^{2})
- Elevation: 1,079 ft (329 m)

Population (2020)
  - Total: 3,021
  - Density: 902.9/sq mi (348.63/km^{2})
- Time zone: UTC-6 (Central (CST))
  - Summer (DST): UTC-5 (CDT)
- ZIP code: 56353
- Area code: 320
- FIPS code: 27-42110
- GNIS feature ID: 0647836
- Website: www.cityofmilaca.org

Milaca (/mɪˈlækə/ mih-LAK-ə) is a city and the county seat of Mille Lacs County, Minnesota, United States. The population was 3,021 at the time of the 2020 census. It is situated on the Rum River.

== History ==
A post office has been in operation at Milaca since 1883. The name Milaca is derived from shortening and alteration of Mille Lacs Lake.

== Geography ==
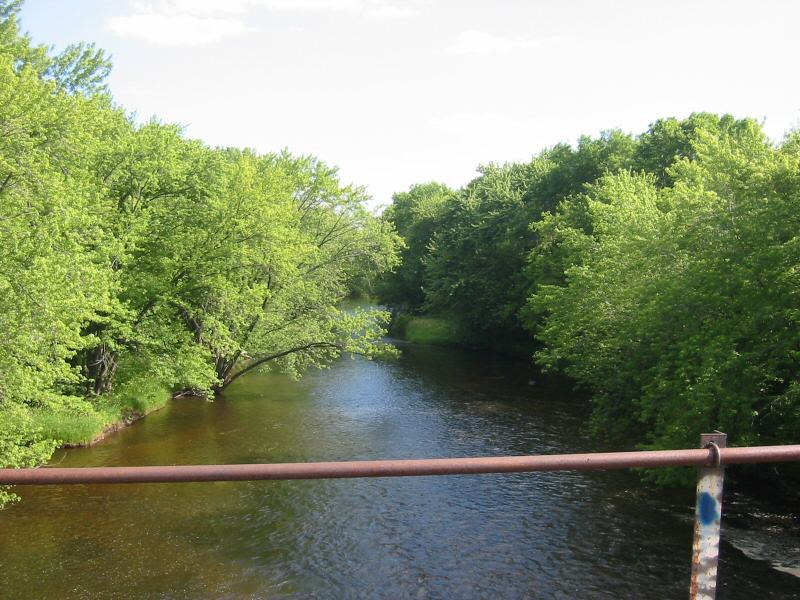
The Rum River flows on the west side of Milaca.

Milaca is in southern Mille Lacs County. U.S. Highway 169 passes through the east side of the city as a four-lane bypass, leading north 25 miles (40 km) to Mille Lacs Lake and south 14 miles (23 km) to Princeton. Minneapolis is 64 miles (103 km) to the south. Minnesota State Highway 23 runs through Milaca south of its center, leading northeast 21 miles (34 km) to Mora and southwest 29 miles (47 km) to St. Cloud.

According to the U.S. Census Bureau, Milaca has a total area of 3.55 square miles (9.19 km^{2}), of which 3.35 square miles (8.68 km^{2}) are land and 0.20 square miles (0.52 km^{2}), or 5.77%, are water. The Rum River passes through the west side of the city, flowing south to join the Mississippi River at Anoka. A segment of Vondell Brook, a tributary of the Rum River with headwaters in Bock, Minnesota, flows less than 0.5 miles (0.80 km) east of the city.

=== Climate ===
Climate data for Milaca, Minnesota, 1991–2020 normals, extremes 1897–present
Month	Jan	Feb	Mar	Apr	May	Jun	Jul	Aug	Sep	Oct	Nov	Dec	Year
Record high °F (°C)	60 (16)	58 (14)	81 (27)	94 (34)	107 (42)	103 (39)	108 (42)	103 (39)	104 (40)	90 (32)	74 (23)	63 (17)	108 (42)
Mean maximum °F (°C)	40.4 (4.7)	45.3 (7.4)	59.7 (15.4)	75.6 (24.2)	86.1 (30.1)	89.7 (32.1)	90.5 (32.5)	89.2 (31.8)	85.8 (29.9)	77.1 (25.1)	59.0 (15.0)	43.3 (6.3)	93.0 (33.9)
Mean daily maximum °F (°C)	20.4 (−6.4)	26.0 (−3.3)	38.4 (3.6)	53.2 (11.8)	66.4 (19.1)	75.6 (24.2)	80.1 (26.7)	78.0 (25.6)	70.4 (21.3)	55.9 (13.3)	39.1 (3.9)	26.0 (−3.3)	52.5 (11.4)
Daily mean °F (°C)	10.5 (−11.9)	14.8 (−9.6)	27.6 (−2.4)	41.8 (5.4)	54.6 (12.6)	64.7 (18.2)	69.4 (20.8)	66.9 (19.4)	58.4 (14.7)	45.0 (7.2)	30.1 (−1.1)	17.5 (−8.1)	41.8 (5.4)
Mean daily minimum °F (°C)	0.5 (−17.5)	3.7 (−15.7)	16.7 (−8.5)	30.3 (−0.9)	42.9 (6.1)	53.8 (12.1)	58.6 (14.8)	55.8 (13.2)	46.4 (8.0)	34.0 (1.1)	21.0 (−6.1)	9.0 (−12.8)	31.1 (−0.5)
Mean minimum °F (°C)	−23.8 (−31.0)	−17.1 (−27.3)	−6.7 (−21.5)	17.1 (−8.3)	30.6 (−0.8)	40.6 (4.8)	48.7 (9.3)	46.2 (7.9)	32.5 (0.3)	21.7 (−5.7)	3.8 (−15.7)	−14.6 (−25.9)	−25.6 (−32.0)
Record low °F (°C)	−48 (−44)	−48 (−44)	−32 (−36)	−2 (−19)	15 (−9)	24 (−4)	36 (2)	32 (0)	20 (−7)	5 (−15)	−22 (−30)	−39 (−39)	−48 (−44)
Average precipitation inches (mm)	0.77 (20)	0.85 (22)	1.43 (36)	2.74 (70)	3.82 (97)	4.31 (109)	4.39 (112)	3.97 (101)	3.19 (81)	2.82 (72)	1.41 (36)	1.11 (28)	30.81 (784)
Average snowfall inches (cm)	7.4 (19)	11.1 (28)	8.4 (21)	4.4 (11)	0.1 (0.25)	0.0 (0.0)	0.0 (0.0)	0.0 (0.0)	0.0 (0.0)	0.8 (2.0)	6.5 (17)	10.2 (26)	48.9 (124.25)
Average precipitation days (≥ 0.01 in)	6.0	5.0	6.5	8.6	11.2	12.0	11.8	10.7	10.3	9.7	6.1	6.9	104.8
Average snowy days (≥ 0.1 in)	6.2	4.4	3.1	1.3	0.1	0.0	0.0	0.0	0.0	0.5	2.4	5.7	23.7
Source 1: NOAA
Source 2: National Weather Service

== Demographics ==
Historical population
Census	Pop.	Note	%±
1890	404		—
1900	1,204		198.0%
1910	1,102		−8.5%
1920	1,347		22.2%
1930	1,318		−2.2%
1940	1,627		23.4%
1950	1,917		17.8%
1960	1,821		−5.0%
1970	1,940		6.5%
1980	2,104		8.5%
1990	2,182		3.7%
2000	2,580		18.2%
2010	2,946		14.2%
2020	3,021		2.5%
U.S. Decennial Census

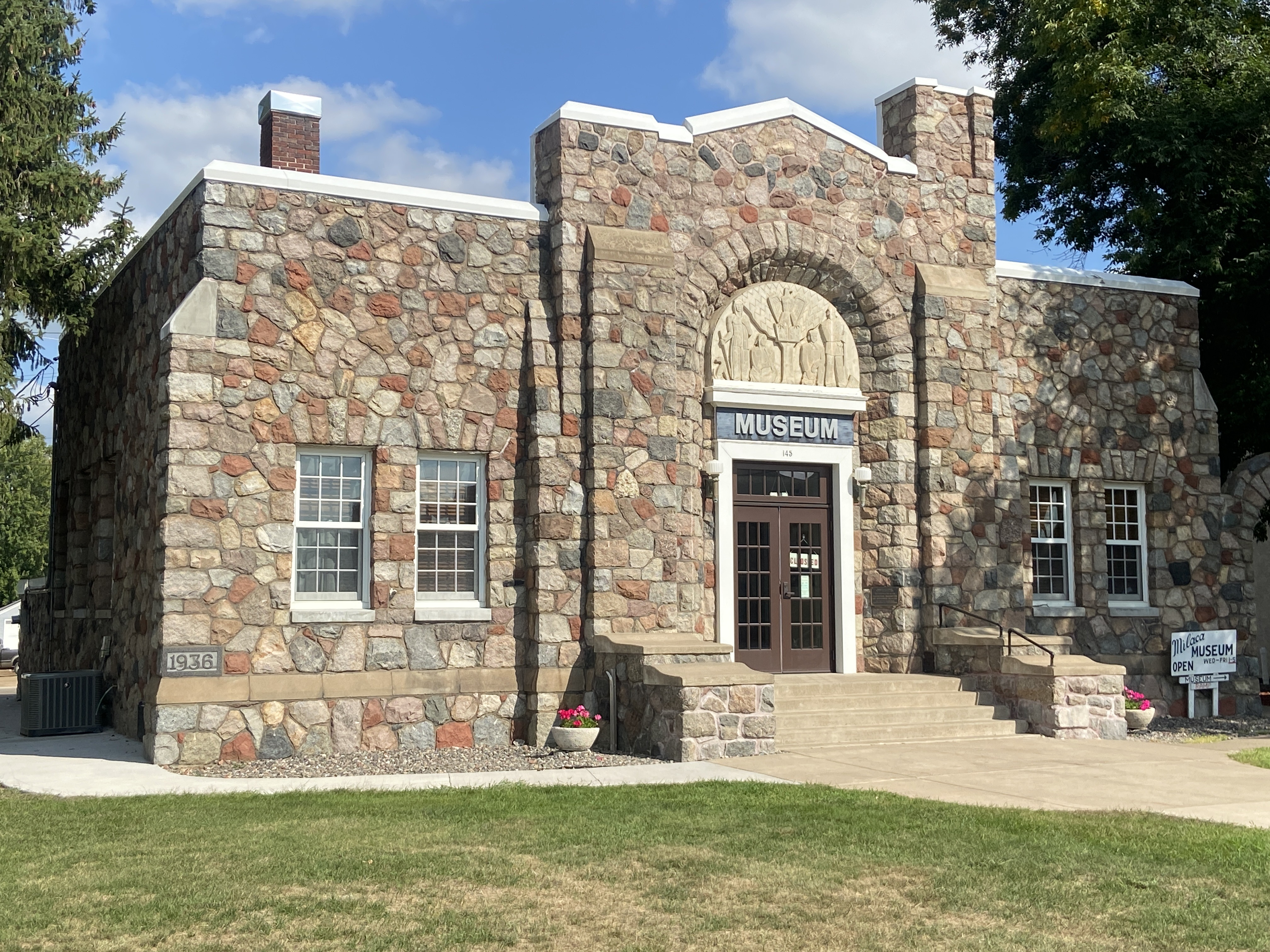
Milaca Museum

=== 2020 census ===
As of the 2020 census, Milaca had a population of 3,021. The median age was 42.9 years. 19.8% of residents were under the age of 18 and 24.7% of residents were 65 years of age or older. For every 100 females there were 91.7 males, and for every 100 females age 18 and over there were 89.5 males age 18 and over.

0.0% of residents lived in urban areas, while 100.0% lived in rural areas.

There were 1,376 households in Milaca, of which 22.5% had children under the age of 18 living in them. Of all households, 32.9% were married-couple households, 21.1% were households with a male householder and no spouse or partner present, and 35.5% were households with a female householder and no spouse or partner present. About 41.0% of all households were made up of individuals and 21.4% had someone living alone who was 65 years of age or older.

There were 1,469 housing units, of which 6.3% were vacant. The homeowner vacancy rate was 1.8% and the rental vacancy rate was 5.5%.

Racial composition as of the 2020 census
Race	Number	Percent
White	2,794	92.5%
Black or African American	12	0.4%
American Indian and Alaska Native	36	1.2%
Asian	14	0.5%
Native Hawaiian and Other Pacific Islander	1	0.0%
Some other race	16	0.5%
Two or more races	148	4.9%
Hispanic or Latino (of any race)	32	1.1%

=== 2010 census ===
As of the census of 2010, there were 2,946 people, 1,308 households, and 691 families living in the city. The population density was 917.8 inhabitants per square mile (354.4/km^{2}). There were 1,449 housing units at an average density of 451.4 per square mile (174.3/km^{2}). The racial makeup of the city was 96.1% White, 0.4% African American, 1.4% Native American, 0.3% Asian, 0.1% from other races, and 1.6% from two or more races. Hispanic or Latino of any race were 0.6% of the population.

There were 1,308 households, of which 26.9% had children under the age of 18 living with them, 37.2% were married couples living together, 11.4% had a female householder with no husband present, 4.3% had a male householder with no wife present, and 47.2% were non-families. 40.6% of all households were made up of individuals, and 21.7% had someone living alone who was 65 years of age or older. The average household size was 2.12 and the average family size was 2.84.

The median age in the city was 39.7 years. 21.5% of residents were under the age of 18; 8.7% were between the ages of 18 and 24; 25.8% were from 25 to 44; 20.6% were from 45 to 64; and 23.5% were 65 years of age or older. The gender makeup of the city was 48.1% male and 51.9% female.

=== 2000 census ===
As of the census of 2000, there were 2,580 people, 1,115 households, and 636 families living in the city. The population density was 808.2 inhabitants per square mile (312.0/km^{2}). There were 1,164 housing units at an average density of 364.6 per square mile (140.8/km^{2}). The racial makeup of the city was 96.67% White, 0.12% African American, 1.28% Native American, 0.19% Asian, 0.04% from other races, and 1.71% from two or more races. Hispanic or Latino of any race were 0.97% of the population.

There were 1,115 households, out of which 26.1% had children under the age of 18 living with them, 43.0% were married couples living together, 10.9% had a female householder with no husband present, and 42.9% were non-families. 39.0% of all households were made up of individuals, and 19.7% had someone living alone who was 65 years of age or older. The average household size was 2.14 and the average family size was 2.82.

In the city, the population was spread out, with 22.5% under the age of 18, 8.1% from 18 to 24, 24.6% from 25 to 44, 19.2% from 45 to 64, and 25.5% who were 65 years of age or older. The median age was 40 years. For every 100 females, there were 81.8 males. For every 100 females age 18 and over, there were 77.4 males.

The median income for a household in the city was $26,964, and the median income for a family was $40,739. Males had a median income of $35,250 versus $24,531 for females. The per capita income for the city was $17,005. About 10.4% of families and 15.6% of the population were below the poverty line, including 16.4% of those under age 18 and 21.2% of those age 65 or over.

== Education ==
Milaca Public Schools is composed of Milaca Elementary and Milaca High School. The elementary and secondary schools are connected to form one school toward the west of the city, along Highway 23 and the Rum River. There are approximately 1,900 students Pre-K through 12th grade, and around 130 teachers. The high school has a science and research forest. There are 11 varsity sports and reputable music and arts programs. The Star Tribune ranked the music program best in the state. Each summer the marching band receives very high rankings for their performances. The teams are the Milaca Wolves. There is also special education, community education, an Area Learning Center (ALC), and gifted education programming.

=== ALC ===
The Milaca School District has an alternative high school that is separate from the main high school. The Milaca ALC (Area Learning Center) aims to educate students who need to repeat classes or have other life challenges and require a different education style and format. The ALC enrolls approximately 40 to 50 students ages 16–19, with four fully licensed high school teachers. Students can earn .5 credits per class in one quarter, as opposed to .5 credits per class in one semester at the high school. Classes are longer: an hour and a half for day classes and two hours for after-school classes. Several required courses can be completed as an independent study under the guidance and direction of the classroom teacher. The ALC offers no extracurricular activities, but students can participate in extra courses and activities at the main high school. While the majority of Milaca ALC students live within the Milaca School District, students from outside the district can enroll and earn credits for graduation. The ALC is many students' last chance to earn a high school diploma.

== Infrastructure ==
Milaca is served by the Milaca Municipal Airport.

=== Major highways ===
The following routes pass through Milaca:

- U.S. Highway 169
- Minnesota State Highway 23

== A useless fact ==
On one of their water towers, there's 3 ACA Screamer S-10 sirens.
