= Milo Township, Mille Lacs County, Minnesota =

Milo Township, Minnesota
- Township
- Location within the state of Minnesota Milo Township, Minnesota (the United States)
- Coordinates: 45°40′48″N 93°41′6″W
- Country: United States
- State: Minnesota
- County: Mille Lacs

Area
  - Total: 34.3 sq mi (88.9 km^{2})
  - Land: 34.2 sq mi (88.7 km^{2})
  - Water: 0.077 sq mi (0.2 km^{2})
- Elevation: 1,030 ft (314 m)

Population (2010)
  - Total: 1,385
  - Density: 40.4/sq mi (15.6/km^{2})
- Time zone: UTC-6 (Central (CST))
  - Summer (DST): UTC-5 (CDT)
- FIPS code: 27-42326
- GNIS feature ID: 0664979

Milo Township is a township in Mille Lacs County, Minnesota, United States. The population was 1,385 at the 2010 census.

Milo Township was organized in 1869, and named after Milo, Maine.

== Geography ==
According to the United States Census Bureau, the township has a total area of 34.3 square miles (88.9 km^{2}), of which 34.2 square miles (88.7 km^{2}) is land and 0.08 square miles (0.2 km^{2}), or 0.21%, is water.

== Demographics ==
As of the census of 2000, there were 1,076 people, 361 households, and 294 families residing in the township. The population density was 30.9 inhabitants per square mile (11.9/km^{2}). There were 371 housing units at an average density of 10.6/sq mi (4.1/km^{2}). The racial makeup of the township was 98.33% White, 0.19% African American, 0.37% Native American, 0.09% Asian, 0.46% from other races, and 0.56% from two or more races. Hispanic or Latino of any race were 1.67% of the population.

There were 361 households, out of which 41.8% had children under the age of 18 living with them, 71.7% were married couples living together, 5.8% had a female householder with no husband present, and 18.3% were non-families. 14.1% of all households were made up of individuals, and 5.3% had someone living alone who was 65 years of age or older. The average household size was 2.98 and the average family size was 3.31.

In the township the population was spread out, with 31.8% under the age of 18, 7.5% from 18 to 24, 28.8% from 25 to 44, 22.5% from 45 to 64, and 9.4% who were 65 years of age or older. The median age was 36 years. For every 100 females, there were 109.7 males. For every 100 females age 18 and over, there were 108.5 males.

The median income for a household in the township was $44,868, and the median income for a family was $49,250. Males had a median income of $31,250 versus $20,766 for females. The per capita income for the township was $18,327. About 6.8% of families and 8.7% of the population were below the poverty line, including 9.7% of those under age 18 and 13.3% of those age 65 or over.
