= Mille Lacs County, Minnesota =

County in Minnesota, United States

- County
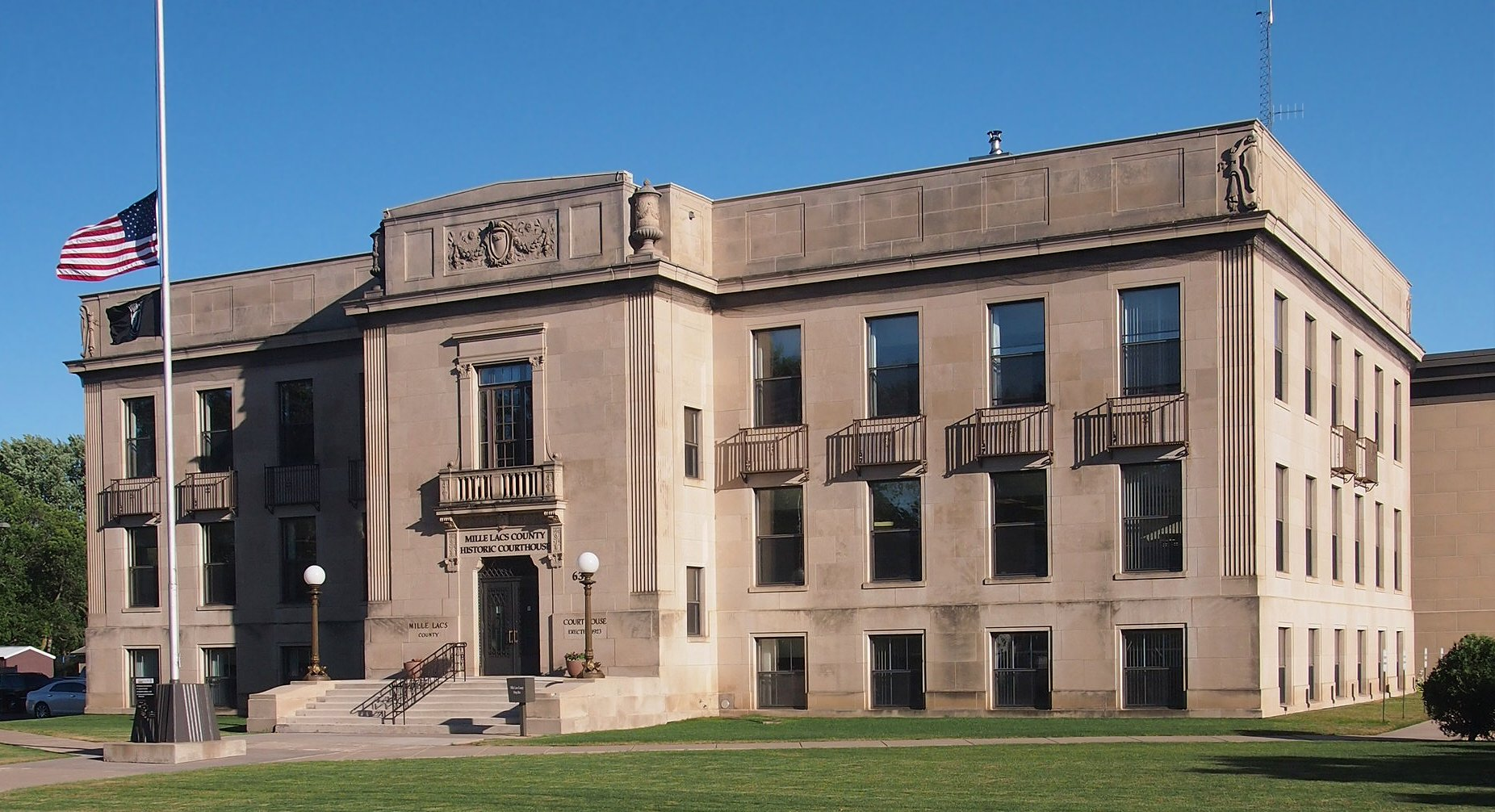
- Mille Lacs County Courthouse

- Location within the U.S. state of Minnesota
- Coordinates: 45°56′N 93°38′W
- Country: United States
- State: Minnesota
- Founded: May 23, 1857
- Named for: Mille Lacs Lake
- Seat: Milaca
- Largest city: Princeton

Area
  - Total: 682 sq mi (1,770 km^{2})
  - Land: 572 sq mi (1,480 km^{2})
  - Water: 109 sq mi (280 km^{2}) 16%

Population (2020)
  - Total: 26,459
  - Estimate (2025): 27,753 ▲
  - Density: 46.3/sq mi (17.9/km^{2})
- Time zone: UTC−6 (Central)
  - Summer (DST): UTC−5 (CDT)
- Congressional district: 8th
- Website: www.millelacs.mn.gov

Mille Lacs County (/məˈlæks/ mə-LAKS) is a county in the East Central part of the U.S. state of Minnesota. As of the 2020 census, the population was 26,459. Its county seat is Milaca. The county was founded in 1857, and its boundary was expanded in 1860.

Mille Lacs County is included in the Minneapolis-St. Paul Metropolitan Statistical Area.

A portion of the Mille Lacs Indian Reservation is in the county.

== Etymology ==
The name Mille Lacs, meaning "thousand lakes" in French, was associated with Mille Lacs Lake in the region. (Its full name in French was Grand lac du pays des mille lacs.) This is the largest lake in the Brainerd Lakes Area, which French colonists and traders called the "Region of the Thousand Lakes" (Pays des mille lacs).

== History ==
The US legislature established the Wisconsin Territory effective July 3, 1836. It existed until its eastern portion was granted statehood (as Wisconsin) in 1848. The federal government set up the Minnesota Territory from the remaining territory effective March 3, 1849. The newly organized territorial legislature created nine counties across the territory in October of that year. On May 23, 1857, one of those original counties, Benton, had its eastern portion partitioned off to create Mille Lacs County. The original county consisted of the portion of the contemporary Mille Lacs County east of the west branch of the Rum River and two townships now part of Isanti County, adjacent to Mille Lacs County. In 1858 the 12 townships forming the contemporary southern 10 townships of Mille Lacs County and the two northwestern townships in Isanti County were organized apart from Benton and Mille Lacs Counties to form Monroe County, leaving the northern "Square Top-knot" as Mille Lacs County. In 1860, Monroe and Mille Lacs Counties merged. Shortly thereafter, the two southeastern townships were transferred to Isanti County, forming the county's present boundaries.

== Geography ==
The Rum River flows south through the county, originating from Mille Lacs Lake. It is joined by the West Branch of the Rum River, which rises in northwest Mille Lacs County and flows south-southeast to its confluence with the Rum at Princeton. The county terrain consists of wooded rolling hills, carved by drainages, with open areas devoted to agriculture. The terrain slopes to the south and east, with its highest point at one mile (1.6 km) from the southwest shoreline of Mille Lacs Lake, in Mille Lacs Kathio State Park. A hill there measures 1,371 ft (418 m) ASL.

According to the United States Census Bureau, the county has a total area of 682 square miles (1,770 km^{2}), of which 572 square miles (1,480 km^{2}) is land and 109 square miles (280 km^{2}) (16%) is water.

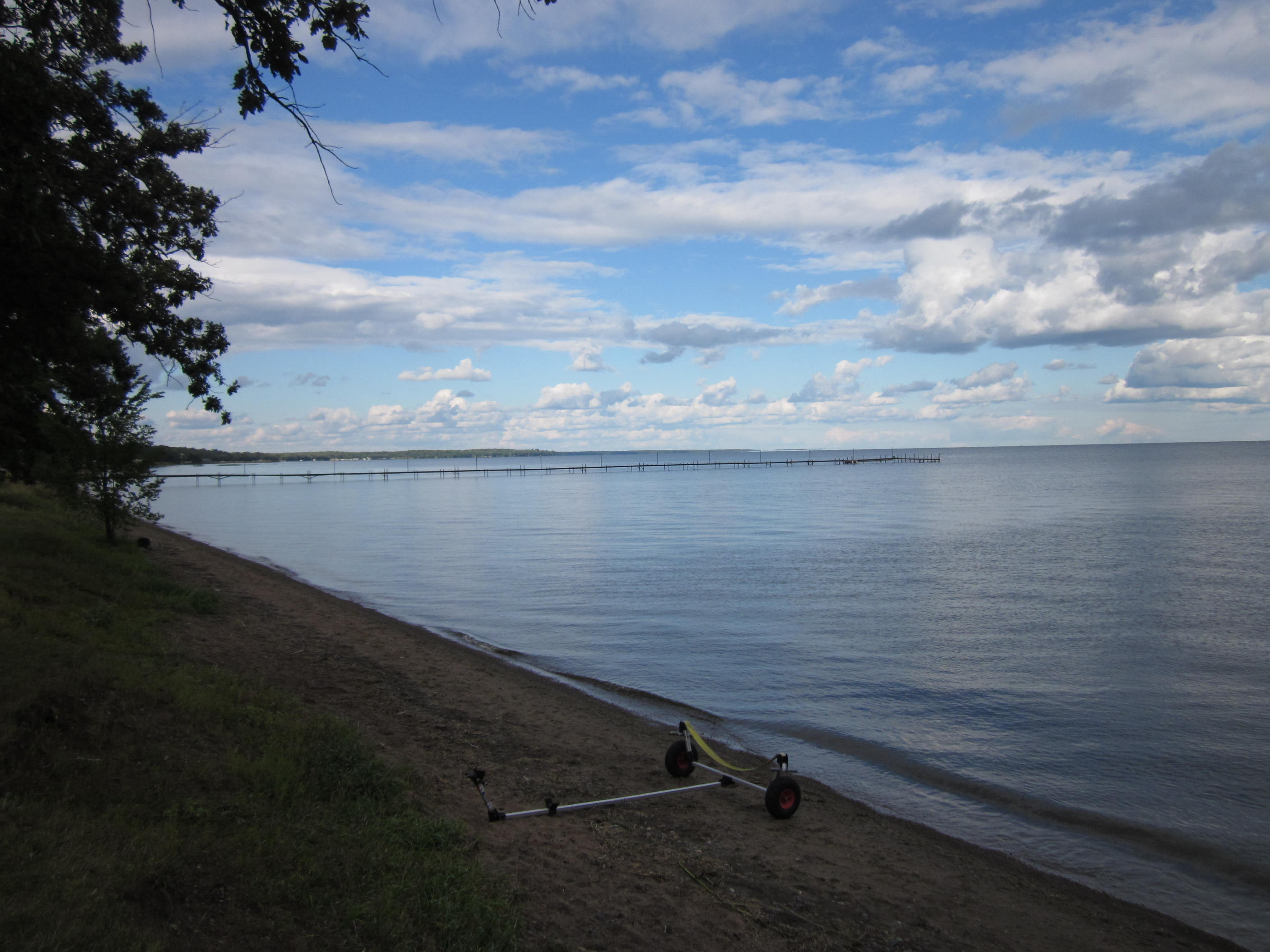
Mille Lacs located in the north of Mille Lacs County

=== Major highways ===
- U.S. Highway 169
- Minnesota State Highway 18
- Minnesota State Highway 23
- Minnesota State Highway 27
- Minnesota State Highway 47
- Minnesota State Highway 95

=== Airports ===
- Milaca Municipal Airport (18Y) - northeast of Milaca
- Princeton Municipal Airport (PNM) - southwest of Princeton

=== Adjacent counties ===
- Aitkin County - north
- Kanabec County - northeast
- Isanti County - southeast
- Sherburne County - south
- Benton County - southwest
- Morrison County - west
- Crow Wing County - northwest

=== Protected areas ===
Sources:

- Father Hennepin State Park
- Four Brooks State Wildlife Management Area (part)
- Kunkel State Wildlife Management Area
- Mille Lacs Kathio State Park
- Mille Lacs National Wildlife Refuge
- Mille Lacs State Wildlife Management Area
- Rum River State Forest
- Solana State Forest (part)

== Demographics ==
Historical population
Census	Pop.	Note	%±
1860	73		—
1870	1,109		1,419.2%
1880	1,501		35.3%
1890	2,845		89.5%
1900	8,066		183.5%
1910	10,705		32.7%
1920	14,180		32.5%
1930	14,076		−0.7%
1940	15,558		10.5%
1950	15,165		−2.5%
1960	14,560		−4.0%
1970	15,703		7.9%
1980	18,430		17.4%
1990	18,670		1.3%
2000	22,330		19.6%
2010	26,097		16.9%
2020	26,459		1.4%
2025 (est.)	27,753	▲	4.9%
U.S. Decennial Census; 1790-1960 1900-1990; 1990-2000 2010-2020

=== 2020 census ===
As of the 2020 census, the county had a population of 26,459. The median age was 41.7 years. 23.3% of residents were under the age of 18 and 19.9% of residents were 65 years of age or older. For every 100 females there were 101.5 males, and for every 100 females age 18 and over there were 100.6 males age 18 and over.

The racial makeup of the county was 88.0% White, 0.3% Black or African American, 5.7% American Indian and Alaska Native, 0.5% Asian, <0.1% Native Hawaiian and Pacific Islander, 0.7% from some other race, and 4.8% from two or more races. Hispanic or Latino residents of any race comprised 1.8% of the population.

18.2% of residents lived in urban areas, while 81.8% lived in rural areas.

There were 10,593 households in the county, of which 28.3% had children under the age of 18 living in them. Of all households, 47.7% were married-couple households, 19.5% were households with a male householder and no spouse or partner present, and 23.3% were households with a female householder and no spouse or partner present. About 28.8% of all households were made up of individuals and 13.7% had someone living alone who was 65 years of age or older.

There were 12,786 housing units, of which 17.2% were vacant. Among occupied housing units, 76.4% were owner-occupied and 23.6% were renter-occupied. The homeowner vacancy rate was 1.2% and the rental vacancy rate was 6.3%.

=== Racial and ethnic composition ===
Mille Lacs County, Minnesota – Racial and ethnic composition Note: the US Census treats Hispanic/Latino as an ethnic category. This table excludes Latinos from the racial categories and assigns them to a separate category. Hispanics/Latinos may be of any race.
Race / Ethnicity (NH = Non-Hispanic)	Pop 1980	Pop 1990	Pop 2000	Pop 2010	Pop 2020	% 1980	% 1990	% 2000	% 2010	% 2020
White alone (NH)	17,773	17,906	20,760	23,582	23,131	96.44%	95.91%	92.97%	90.36%	87.42%
Black or African American alone (NH)	20	26	59	96	78	0.11%	0.14%	0.26%	0.37%	0.29%
Native American or Alaska Native alone (NH)	495	615	1,032	1,534	1,466	2.69%	3.29%	4.62%	5.88%	5.54%
Asian alone (NH)	44	35	45	79	124	0.24%	0.19%	0.20%	0.30%	0.47%
Native Hawaiian or Pacific Islander alone (NH)	x	x	3	2	6	x	x	0.01%	0.01%	0.02%
Other race alone (NH)	26	1	14	11	98	0.14%	0.01%	0.06%	0.04%	0.37%
Mixed race or Multiracial (NH)	x	x	203	416	1,075	x	x	0.91%	1.59%	4.06%
Hispanic or Latino (any race)	72	87	214	377	481	0.39%	0.47%	0.96%	1.44%	1.82%
Total	18,430	18,670	22,330	26,097	26,459	100.00%	100.00%	100.00%	100.00%	100.00%

=== 2000 census ===
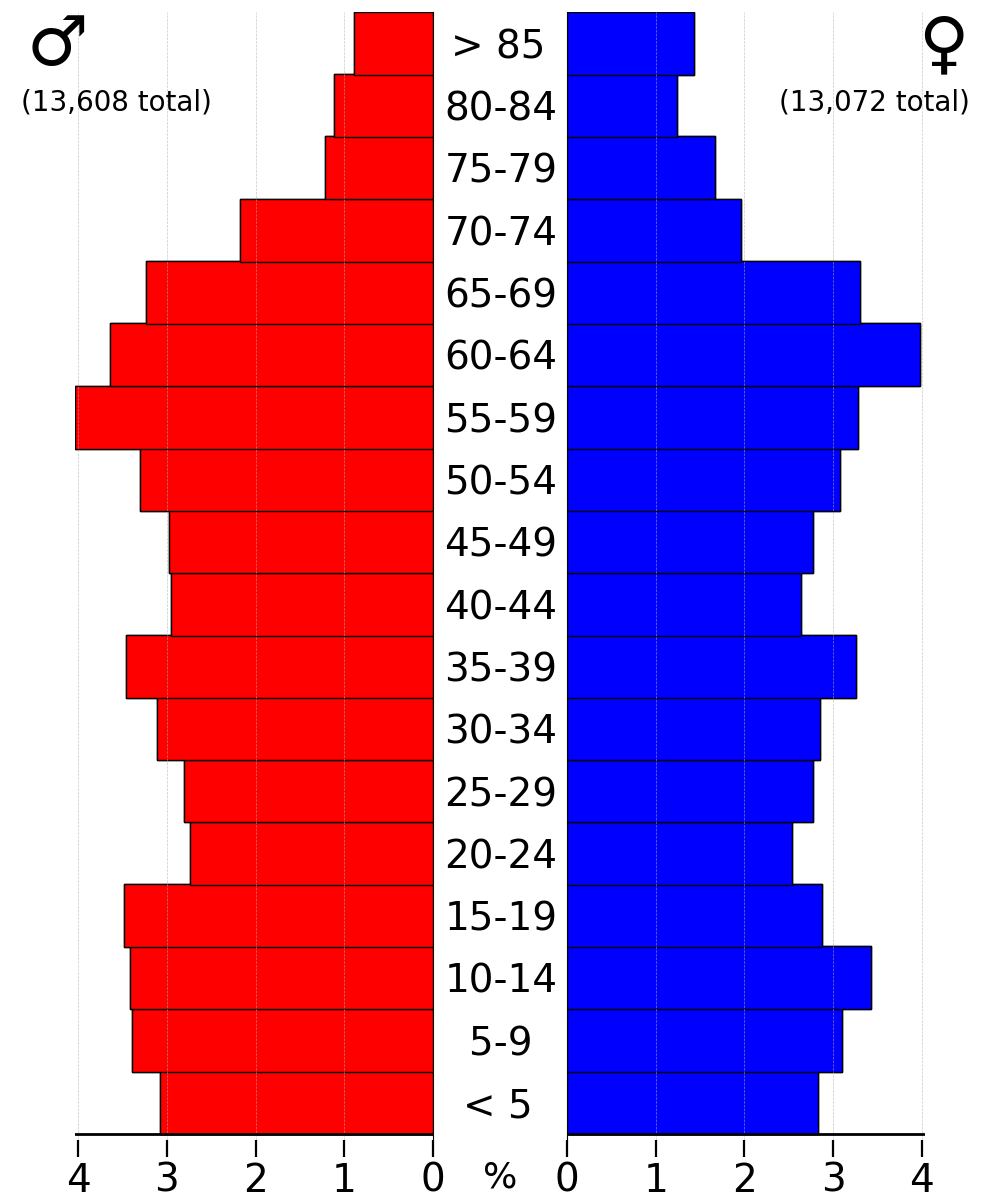
2022 US Census population pyramid for Mille Lacs County, from ACS 5-year estimates

As of the census of 2000, there were 22,330 people, 8,638 households, and 6,003 families in the county. The population density was 39.0 per square mile (15.1/km^{2}). There were 10,467 housing units at an average density of 18.3 per square mile (7.1/km^{2}). The racial makeup of the county was 93.55% White, 0.27% Black or African American, 4.68% Native American, 0.21% Asian, 0.01% Pacific Islander, 0.22% from other races, and 1.05% from two or more races. 0.96% of the population were Hispanic or Latino of any race. 31.9% were of German, 14.4% Swedish and 14.2% Norwegian ancestry.

There were 8,638 households, out of which 32.20% had children under the age of 18 living with them, 55.50% were married couples living together, 9.50% had a female householder with no husband present, and 30.50% were non-families. 25.90% of all households were made up of individuals, and 12.00% had someone living alone who was 65 years of age or older. The average household size was 2.53 and the average family size was 3.03.

The county population contained 27.00% under the age of 18, 7.50% from 18 to 24, 26.90% from 25 to 44, 22.60% from 45 to 64, and 16.10% who were 65 years of age or older. The median age was 38 years. For every 100 females there were 98.00 males. For every 100 females age 18 and over, there were 96.10 males.

The median income for a household in the county was $36,977, and the median income for a family was $44,054. Males had a median income of $32,348 versus $22,036 for females. The per capita income for the county was $17,656. About 6.70% of families and 9.60% of the population were below the poverty line, including 10.90% of those under age 18 and 11.30% of those age 65 or over.

== Communities ==
=== Cities ===
- Bock
- Foreston
- Isle (Chi-minising)
- Milaca (county seat)
- Onamia
- Pease
- Princeton (partly in Sherburne County)
- Wahkon

=== Census-designated place ===
- Vineland (Neyaashiing)

=== Unincorporated communities ===
- Bayview
- Cove
- Estes Brook
- Long Siding
- Opstead
- Page
- Woodward Brook

=== Ghost towns ===
- Brickton
- Burnhelm Siding
- Esteville
- Freer
- Johnsdale
- Soule's Crossing
- Stirling

=== Townships ===
- Bogus Brook Township
- Borgholm Township
- Bradbury Township
- Dailey Township
- East Side Township
- Greenbush Township
- Hayland Township
- Isle Harbor Township
- Kathio Township
- Lewis Township
- Milaca Township
- Milo Township
- Mudgett Township
- Onamia Township
- Page Township
- Princeton Township
- South Harbor Township

== Politics ==
Mille Lacs County voters have traditionally voted a balanced ticket, but in the past few decades have become strongly Republican. Since 1980 the county selected the Republican Party candidate in 67% of national elections (as of 2020), and has done so in every election beginning in 2000.

United States presidential election results for Mille Lacs County, Minnesota
Year	Republican		Democratic		Third party(ies)	
Year	No.	%	No.	%	No.	%
1892	463	56.05%	223	27.00%	140	16.95%
1896	977	66.78%	456	31.17%	30	2.05%
1900	1,072	71.42%	358	23.85%	71	4.73%
1904	1,451	83.87%	154	8.90%	125	7.23%
1908	1,119	61.96%	427	23.64%	260	14.40%
1912	392	19.55%	449	22.39%	1,164	58.05%
1916	1,127	44.58%	1,113	44.03%	288	11.39%
1920	3,521	73.17%	526	10.93%	765	15.90%
1924	2,413	48.79%	167	3.38%	2,366	47.84%
1928	3,998	72.01%	1,436	25.86%	118	2.13%
1932	1,986	34.03%	3,538	60.62%	312	5.35%
1936	2,091	33.62%	3,767	60.56%	362	5.82%
1940	3,459	48.37%	3,619	50.61%	73	1.02%
1944	2,798	49.03%	2,872	50.32%	37	0.65%
1948	2,502	41.43%	3,343	55.36%	194	3.21%
1952	3,766	58.42%	2,639	40.94%	41	0.64%
1956	3,315	55.80%	2,619	44.08%	7	0.12%
1960	3,913	57.29%	2,886	42.25%	31	0.45%
1964	2,474	36.00%	4,369	63.58%	29	0.42%
1968	2,990	43.40%	3,494	50.71%	406	5.89%
1972	4,291	55.83%	3,221	41.91%	174	2.26%
1976	3,212	37.05%	5,172	59.65%	286	3.30%
1980	3,860	42.83%	4,443	49.30%	710	7.88%
1984	4,307	51.45%	4,011	47.92%	53	0.63%
1988	3,862	46.52%	4,327	52.13%	112	1.35%
1992	2,814	30.74%	3,648	39.85%	2,692	29.41%
1996	2,948	33.22%	4,336	48.86%	1,591	17.93%
2000	5,223	50.94%	4,376	42.68%	654	6.38%
2004	7,194	55.06%	5,677	43.45%	194	1.48%
2008	7,049	52.05%	6,072	44.83%	423	3.12%
2012	6,951	53.10%	5,829	44.53%	311	2.38%
2016	8,340	64.07%	3,710	28.50%	967	7.43%
2020	9,952	67.75%	4,404	29.98%	333	2.27%
2024	10,570	69.59%	4,374	28.80%	246	1.62%

== Education ==
School districts include:

- Isle Public School District
- Milaca Public School District
- Ogilvie Public School District
- Onamia Public Schools
- Princeton Public School District

== See also ==
- National Register of Historic Places listings in Mille Lacs County, Minnesota
