= Silver Corners, Minnesota =

Unincorporated community in Minnesota, US

Silver Corners
- Unincorporated community
- Location within Minnesota Location within the United States
- Coordinates: 45°45′04″N 94°05′19″W
- Country: United States
- State: Minnesota
- County: Benton
- Township: Graham Township
- Elevation: 1,142 ft (348 m)
- Time zone: UTC-6 (Central (CST))
  - Summer (DST): UTC-5 (CDT)
- ZIP code: 56367
- Area code: 320
- GNIS feature ID: 652025

Silver Corners is an unincorporated community in Graham Township, Benton County, Minnesota, United States. The community is located near the junction of Benton County Road 2 and State Highway 25 (MN 25). Nearby places include Rice and Gilman. Mayhew Creek flows through the community.
