= Alberta Township, Benton County, Minnesota =

Township in Minnesota, United States

Alberta Township
- Township
- Location within the state of Minnesota
- Coordinates: 45°46′28″N 93°56′22″W
- Country: United States
- State: Minnesota
- County: Benton

Area
  - Total: 36.2 sq mi (93.8 km^{2})
  - Land: 36.2 sq mi (93.8 km^{2})
  - Water: 0 sq mi (0.0 km^{2})
- Elevation: 1,224 ft (373 m)

Population (2010)
  - Total: 818
  - Density: 23/sq mi (8.7/km^{2})
- Time zone: UTC-6 (Central (CST))
  - Summer (DST): UTC-5 (CDT)
- FIPS code: 27-00668
- GNIS feature ID: 0663399

Alberta Township is a township in Benton County, Minnesota, United States. The population was 818 as of the 2010 census.

Alberta Township was organized in 1868. It was named for an early settler named Albert.

== Geography ==
According to the United States Census Bureau, the township has a total area of 36.2 square miles (93.8 km^{2}), all land.

The north half of the city of Gilman is within the township geographically but is a separate entity.

=== Unincorporated communities ===
- Brennyville
- Jakeville
- North Benton

=== Major highway ===
- Minnesota State Highway 25

=== Adjacent townships ===
- Morrill Township, Morrison County (north)
- Lakin Township, Morrison County (northeast)
- Granite Ledge Township (east)
- Maywood Township (southeast)
- Gilmanton Township (south)
- Mayhew Lake Township (southwest)
- Graham Township (west)
- Buckman Township, Morrison County (northwest)

=== Cemeteries ===
The township contains three cemeteries: Fairview, Polish National Catholic Church and Saint Elizabeth.

== Demographics ==
As of the census of 2000, there were 772 people, 251 households, and 210 families residing in the township. The population density was 21.3 people per square mile (8.2/km^{2}). There were 256 housing units at an average density of 7.1/sq mi (2.7/km^{2}). The racial makeup of the township was 99.35% White, 0.13% African American, 0.26% Native American, 0.13% Asian, and 0.13% from two or more races.

There were 251 households, out of which 45.4% had children under the age of 18 living with them, 70.9% were married couples living together, 7.2% had a female householder with no husband present, and 16.3% were non-families. 15.1% of all households were made up of individuals, and 8.4% had someone living alone who was 65 years of age or older. The average household size was 3.08 and the average family size was 3.44.

In the township the population was spread out, with 32.4% under the age of 18, 8.2% from 18 to 24, 30.4% from 25 to 44, 19.3% from 45 to 64, and 9.7% who were 65 years of age or older. The median age was 32 years. For every 100 females, there were 107.5 males. For every 100 females age 18 and over, there were 105.5 males.

The median income for a household in the township was $48,958, and the median income for a family was $55,000. Males had a median income of $34,615 versus $22,366 for females. The per capita income for the township was $17,027. About 7.2% of families and 7.8% of the population were below the poverty line, including 8.3% of those under age 18 and 19.6% of those age 65 or over.
