= Edward Indrehus =

American politician

- Indrehus in 1915

Member of the Minnesota House of Representatives from the 45th district
- In office January 4, 1915 – January 5, 1919
- Preceded by: District established
- Succeeded by: Oliver Chirhart

Personal details
- Born: Elias Pedersen Indrehus; January 16, 1873 Bergen, Norway
- Died: March 13, 1933 (aged 60)
- Party: Democratic
- Relations: Kristofer Indrehus

Edward Petersen Indrehus (January 16, 1873 – March 13, 1933) was an American Democratic politician and farmer from Foley, Minnesota. He was a member of the Minnesota House of Representatives, representing Benton and Sherburne Counties from 1915 until 1919.

== Biography ==
Indrehus's family immigrated to Minnesota from Norway in 1890, when Indrehus was seven years old. He first lived in Minneapolis, and moved to St. Cloud in 1900.

In 1906, he was elected Warden of the Minnesota Game and Fish Commission.

Indrehus was elected twice to the Minnesota House of Representatives, serving from 1915 – 1919. In 1922, he was nominated by the Democratic party to run for governor. Indrehus was opposed to the proposed Fusion of the Democrats with the Farmer-Labor Party. Indrehus would finish third, with 11.66% of the vote. In 1930, Indrehus would be nominated by the Democrats a second time. However, he once again placed third, this time with only 3.65%.

He died on March 13, 1933 in Saint Paul. He was survived by his wife Margaret and two daughters.

Party political offices
Preceded by Laurence C. Hodgson (1920), Andrew Nelson (1928)	Democratic nominee for Governor of Minnesota; 1922, 1930	Succeeded by Carlos Avery (1924), John E. Regan (1932)
