= Morrill, Minnesota =

- Unincorporated community
- Location within Minnesota Location within the United States
- Coordinates: 45°50′20″N 93°58′11″W
- Country: United States
- State: Minnesota
- County: Morrison
- Township: Morrill
- Elevation: 1,309 ft (399 m)
- Time zone: UTC-6 (Central (CST))
  - Summer (DST): UTC-5 (CDT)
- ZIP code: 56364, 56338, and 56329
- Area code: 320
- GNIS feature ID: 648115

Morrill is an unincorporated community in Morrill Township, Morrison County, Minnesota, United States. The community is located near the junction of 330th Avenue and Morrison County Road 26, Nature Road. Nearby places include Pierz, Hillman, Little Rock, Ramey, and Foley.

== History ==
The community was named for Ashby C. Morrill, a county official.
