= Marvin C. Schumann =

American politician

Member of the Minnesota House of Representatives
- In office 1955–1962

Personal details
- Born: May 19, 1906 Graham Township, Benton County, Minnesota, US
- Died: June 15, 1994 (aged 88) Sartell, Minnesota, US
- Party: Republican
- Occupation: farmer and businessman

Marvin Carl Schumann (May 19, 1906 – June 15, 1994) was an American farmer, businessman, and politician.

Schumann was born in Graham Township, Benton County, Minnesota. He lived in Rice, Minnesota with his wife and family. Schumann went to the University of Minnesota School of Agriculture. He was a farmer and was involved in the insurance businessman. Schumann served with the Rice Fire Department. He served on the Rice School Board and on the Benton County Commission. Schumann served in the Minnesota House of Representatives from 1955 to 1962 and was a Republican. Schumann died at the County Manor Health Care and Retirement Center in Sartell, Minnesota.
