= Brennyville, Minnesota =

Unincorporated community in Minnesota, US

Brennyville
- Unincorporated community
- Location within Minnesota Location within the United States
- Coordinates: 45°48′31″N 93°54′21″W
- Country: United States
- State: Minnesota
- County: Benton
- Township: Alberta Township
- Elevation: 1,234 ft (376 m)
- Time zone: UTC-6 (Central (CST))
  - Summer (DST): UTC-5 (CDT)
- ZIP code: 56329
- Area code: 320
- GNIS feature ID: 640462

Brennyville is an unincorporated community in Alberta Township, Benton County, Minnesota, United States. The community is located near the junction of Benton County Roads 14 and 22. Nearby places include Gilman and Foley.
