= Parent, Minnesota =

Unincorporated community in Minnesota, US

Parent
- Unincorporated community
- Location within Minnesota Location within the United States
- Coordinates: 45°37′57″N 93°59′11″W
- Country: United States
- State: Minnesota
- County: Benton
- Township: St. George Township
- Elevation: 1,122 ft (342 m)
- Time zone: UTC-6 (Central (CST))
  - Summer (DST): UTC-5 (CDT)
- ZIP code: 56329
- Area code: 320
- GNIS feature ID: 654870

Parent is an unincorporated community in St. George Township, Benton County, Minnesota, United States, near Foley. The community is located along State Highway 23 (MN 23) near 85th Avenue NE.

Parent was named for Auguste Parent, an early settler of French descent.
