= Duelm, Minnesota =

Unincorporated community in Minnesota, US

Duelm
- Unincorporated community
- Location within Minnesota Location within the United States
- Coordinates: 45°34′20″N 93°56′04″W
- Country: United States
- State: Minnesota
- County: Benton
- Township: St. George Township
- Elevation: 1,030 ft (310 m)
- Time zone: UTC-6 (Central (CST))
  - Summer (DST): UTC-5 (CDT)
- ZIP code: 56329
- Area code: 320
- GNIS feature ID: 642965

Duelm is an unincorporated community in St. George Township, Benton County, Minnesota, United States, near Foley. The community is located along Duelm Road near 110th Avenue. Stoney Brook flows through the community.

State Highways 25 (MN 25) and 95 (MN 95) are also in the immediate area.

Duelm was originally settled chiefly by Germans from the town Dülmen.
