= Popple Creek, Minnesota =

Unincorporated community in Minnesota, US

Popple Creek
- Unincorporated community
- Location within Minnesota Location within the United States
- Coordinates: 45°39′43″N 94°01′28″W
- Country: United States
- State: Minnesota
- County: Benton
- Township: Mayhew Lake Township
- Elevation: 1,076 ft (328 m)
- Time zone: UTC-6 (Central (CST))
  - Summer (DST): UTC-5 (CDT)
- ZIP code: 56379
- Area code: 320
- GNIS feature ID: 654887

Popple Creek is an unincorporated community in Mayhew Lake Township, Benton County, Minnesota, United States. The community is located near the junction of Benton County Roads 3 and 4. Nearby places include Sauk Rapids and Foley.
