= Gilmanton Township, Benton County, Minnesota =

Township in Minnesota, United States

Gilmanton Township
- Township
- Location within the state of Minnesota
- Coordinates: 45°40′32″N 93°57′22″W
- Country: United States
- State: Minnesota
- County: Benton

Area
  - Total: 33.6 sq mi (86.9 km^{2})
  - Land: 33.6 sq mi (86.9 km^{2})
  - Water: 0 sq mi (0.0 km^{2})
- Elevation: 1,180 ft (360 m)

Population (2010)
  - Total: 841
  - Density: 25/sq mi (9.7/km^{2})
- Time zone: UTC-6 (Central (CST))
  - Summer (DST): UTC-5 (CDT)
- FIPS code: 27-23822
- GNIS feature ID: 0664272

Gilmanton Township is a township in Benton County, Minnesota, United States. The population was 841 as of the 2010 census.

== History ==
Gilmanton Township was organized in 1866. It was named for Charles Andrew Gilman, a land office official and afterward state legislator.

== Geography ==
According to the United States Census Bureau, the township has a total area of 33.6 square miles (86.9 km^{2}), all land.

The city of Foley (the county seat) is located in the southeast part of the township; the south half of the city of Gilman is also within the township. Both are separate entities from the township.

=== Major highways ===
- Minnesota State Highway 23
- Minnesota State Highway 25

=== Adjacent townships ===
- Alberta Township (north)
- Granite Ledge Township (northeast)
- Maywood Township (east)
- Glendorado Township (southeast)
- St. George Township (south)
- Minden Township (southwest)
- Mayhew Lake Township (west)
- Graham Township (northwest)

=== Cemeteries ===
The township contains Saint Johns Cemetery.

== Demographics ==
As of the census of 2000, there were 769 people, 266 households, and 213 families residing in the township. The population density was 22.4 people per square mile (8.7/km^{2}). There were 277 housing units at an average density of 8.1/sq mi (3.1/km^{2}). The racial makeup of the township was 98.83% White, 0.13% Native American, 0.39% from other races, and 0.65% from two or more races. Hispanic or Latino of any race were 0.65% of the population.

There were 266 households, out of which 38.0% had children under the age of 18 living with them, 69.5% were married couples living together, 3.8% had a female householder with no husband present, and 19.9% were non-families. 17.3% of all households were made up of individuals, and 7.9% had someone living alone who was 65 years of age or older. The average household size was 2.89 and the average family size was 3.26.

In the township the population was spread out, with 27.7% under the age of 18, 10.4% from 18 to 24, 23.3% from 25 to 44, 26.5% from 45 to 64, and 12.1% who were 65 years of age or older. The median age was 38 years. For every 100 females, there were 111.3 males. For every 100 females age 18 and over, there were 111.4 males.

The median income for a household in the township was $45,893, and the median income for a family was $50,357. Males had a median income of $29,028 versus $22,266 for females. The per capita income for the township was $20,432. About 5.0% of families and 7.5% of the population were below the poverty line, including 11.8% of those under age 18 and 11.8% of those age 65 or over.
