= Rum River, Minnesota =

Unincorporated community in Minnesota, US

Rum River
- Unincorporated community
- Location within Minnesota Location within the United States
- Coordinates: 45°48′26″N 93°49′29″W
- Country: United States
- State: Minnesota
- County: Benton
- Township: Granite Ledge Township
- Elevation: 1,201 ft (366 m)
- Time zone: UTC-6 (Central (CST))
  - Summer (DST): UTC-5 (CDT)
- ZIP code: 56329
- Area code: 320
- GNIS feature ID: 650381

Rum River is an unincorporated community in Granite Ledge Township, Benton County, Minnesota, United States. The community is located near the junction of Benton County Roads 7 and 22. Nearby places include Foley, Oak Park, and Foreston. The West Branch of the Rum River flows nearby.
