= Watab, Minnesota =

Unincorporated community in Minnesota, US

Watab
- Unincorporated community
- Location within Minnesota Location within the United States
- Coordinates: 45°40′35″N 94°10′52″W
- Country: United States
- State: Minnesota
- County: Benton
- Township: Watab Township
- Elevation: 1,043 ft (318 m)
- Time zone: UTC-6 (Central (CST))
  - Summer (DST): UTC-5 (CDT)
- ZIP code: 56379 and 56367
- Area code: 320
- GNIS feature ID: 654997

Watab is an unincorporated community in Watab Township, Benton County, Minnesota, United States. The community is located near the junction of River Road and 75th Street. Nearby places include Sauk Rapids, Sartell, and Rice.

Historical population
Census	Pop.	Note	%±
1860	33		—
1870	22		−33.3%
U.S. Decennial Census

== Transportation ==
Amtrak’s Empire Builder, which operates between Seattle/Portland and Chicago, passes through the town on BNSF tracks, but makes no stop. The nearest station is located in St. Cloud, 10 miles (16 km) to the south.
