= Sauk Rapids =

Sauk Rapids may refer to the following places in Benton County, Minnesota, United States:

- Sauk Rapids, Minnesota, a city
- Sauk Rapids Township, Benton County, Minnesota
