= Jakeville, Minnesota =

Unincorporated community in Minnesota, US

Jakeville
- Unincorporated community
- Location within Minnesota Location within the United States
- Coordinates: 45°45′01″N 93°59′12″W
- Country: United States
- State: Minnesota
- County: Benton
- Township: Alberta Township
- Elevation: 1,204 ft (367 m)
- Time zone: UTC-6 (Central (CST))
  - Summer (DST): UTC-5 (CDT)
- ZIP code: 56329
- Area code: 320
- GNIS feature ID: 654767

Jakeville is an unincorporated community in Alberta Township, Benton County, Minnesota, United States. The community is located near the junction of 85th Avenue NE and State Highway 25 (MN 25). Nearby places include Gilman and Foley.

The Elk River flows nearby.
