= Fruitville, Minnesota =

Unincorporated community in Minnesota, US

Fruitville
- Unincorporated community
- Location within Minnesota Location within the United States
- Coordinates: 45°42′47″N 94°04′46″W
- Country: United States
- State: Minnesota
- County: Benton
- Township: Mayhew Lake Township
- Elevation: 1,142 ft (348 m)
- Time zone: UTC-6 (Central (CST))
  - Summer (DST): UTC-5 (CDT)
- ZIP code: 56379 and 56329
- Area code: 320
- GNIS feature ID: 654717

Fruitville, also known locally as Fruthville, is an unincorporated community in Mayhew Lake Township, Benton County, Minnesota, United States. The community is located along Benton County Road 13 at 40th Avenue NE near Sauk Rapids and Foley.

In 1901, the community was named for brothers Simon and Peter Fruth, early settlers. The GNIS has it named as Fruitville.
