= Oliver Chirhart =

American politician

Oliver Chirhart (August 16, 1875 – November 22, 1962) was an American businessman and politician.

Chirhart was born in Brockway Township, Stearns County, Minnesota, and he went to the Stearns County public schools. He was involved in the real estate, banking, and mercantile businesses. Chirhart also was a teacher. He served as mayor of Rice, Benton County, Minnesota in 1910, 1914, and in 1928 and mayor of Sauk Rapids, Minnesota in 1916 and 1917. Chirhart served in the Minnesota House of Representatives in 1919 and 1920. also served as the justice of the peace in Benton and Stearns Counties. Chirhart lived in Sauk Rapids Rapids, Minnesota with his wife and family and served as justice of the peace in Saul Rapids from 1948 to 1952.
