= Langola Township, Benton County, Minnesota =

Township in Minnesota, United States

Langola Township
- Township
- Location within the state of Minnesota
- Coordinates: 45°47′10″N 94°14′0″W
- Country: United States
- State: Minnesota
- County: Benton

Area
  - Total: 41.3 sq mi (107.0 km^{2})
  - Land: 39.8 sq mi (103.0 km^{2})
  - Water: 1.6 sq mi (4.1 km^{2})
- Elevation: 1,076 ft (328 m)

Population (2010)
  - Total: 906
  - Density: 23/sq mi (8.8/km^{2})
- Time zone: UTC-6 (Central (CST))
  - Summer (DST): UTC-5 (CDT)
- FIPS code: 27-35522
- GNIS feature ID: 0664724
- Website: langolatownship.org

Langola Township is a township in Benton County, Minnesota, United States. The population was 906 as of the 2010 census. Langola Township was organized in 1858.

== Geography ==
According to the United States Census Bureau, the township has a total area of 41.3 square miles (107.0 km^{2}), of which 39.8 square miles (103.0 km^{2}) is land and 1.6 square miles (4.1 km^{2}), or 3.79%, is water.

The city of Royalton and the north half of the city of Rice are within the township geographically but are separate entities.

=== Major highway ===
- U.S. Highway 10

=== Lakes ===
- Graham Lake
- Little Rock Lake (northwest half)

=== Adjacent townships ===
- Buckman Township, Morrison County (northeast)
- Graham Township (east)
- Mayhew Lake Township (southeast)
- Watab Township (southeast)
- Brockway Township, Stearns County (southwest)
- Two Rivers Township, Morrison County (west)
- Bellevue Township, Morrison County (northwest)

== Demographics ==
As of the census of 2000, there were 916 people, 291 households, and 254 families residing in the township. The population density was 23.1 people per square mile (8.9/km^{2}). There were 310 housing units at an average density of 7.8/sq mi (3.0/km^{2}). The racial makeup of the township was 98.69% White, 0.11% African American, 0.11% Native American, 0.44% from other races, and 0.66% from two or more races. Hispanic or Latino of any race were 0.44% of the population.

There were 291 households, out of which 46.7% had children under the age of 18 living with them, 82.1% were married couples living together, 2.4% had a female householder with no husband present, and 12.4% were non-families. 10.7% of all households were made up of individuals, and 4.5% had someone living alone who was 65 years of age or older. The average household size was 3.15 and the average family size was 3.40.

In the township the population was spread out, with 30.9% under the age of 18, 7.6% from 18 to 24, 30.5% from 25 to 44, 23.5% from 45 to 64, and 7.5% who were 65 years of age or older. The median age was 35 years. For every 100 females, there were 112.0 males. For every 100 females age 18 and over, there were 106.9 males.

The median income for a household in the township was $52,667, and the median income for a family was $54,250. Males had a median income of $35,060 versus $23,618 for females. The per capita income for the township was $18,753. About 3.8% of families and 4.4% of the population were below the poverty line, including 6.0% of those under age 18 and 5.5% of those age 65 or over.
