= Minden Township, Benton County, Minnesota =

Township in Minnesota, United States

Minden Township
- Township
- Location within the state of Minnesota
- Coordinates: 45°35′20″N 94°5′7″W
- Country: United States
- State: Minnesota
- County: Benton

Area
  - Total: 33.9 sq mi (87.7 km^{2})
  - Land: 33.7 sq mi (87.4 km^{2})
  - Water: 0.12 sq mi (0.3 km^{2})
- Elevation: 1,076 ft (328 m)

Population (2010)
  - Total: 1,664
  - Density: 49/sq mi (19/km^{2})
- Time zone: UTC-6 (Central (CST))
  - Summer (DST): UTC-5 (CDT)
- FIPS code: 27-42434
- GNIS feature ID: 0664984
- Website: https://www.mindentownship-mn.gov/

Minden Township is a township in Benton County, Minnesota, United States. The population was 1,514 as of the 2020 census. Minden Township was organized in 1858.

== Geography ==
According to the United States Census Bureau, the township has a total area of 33.9 square miles (87.7 km^{2}), of which 33.7 square miles (87.4 km^{2}) is land and 0.12 square miles (0.3 km^{2}), or 0.29%, is water.

The northeast half of the city of St. Cloud and the east quarter of the city of Sauk Rapids are within the township geographically but are separate entities.

=== Major highways ===
- Minnesota State Highway 23
- Minnesota State Highway 95

=== Lakes ===
- Donovan Lake

=== Adjacent townships ===
- Mayhew Lake Township (north)
- Gilmanton Township (northeast)
- St. George Township (east)
- Palmer Township, Sherburne County (southeast)
- Haven Township, Sherburne County (south)
- Sauk Rapids Township (west)
- Watab Township (northwest)

=== Churches ===
- Saint Patrick's Catholic Church

=== Cemeteries ===
The township contains Saint Patrick's Cemetery.

== Demographics ==
As of the census of 2000, there were 1,790 people, 627 households, and 524 families residing in the township. The population density was 49.3 inhabitants per square mile (19.0/km^{2}). There were 636 housing units at an average density of 17.5/sq mi (6.8/km^{2}). The racial makeup of the township was 98.83% White, 0.11% African American, 0.22% Native American, 0.06% Asian, 0.11% from other races, and 0.67% from two or more races. Hispanic or Latino of any race were 0.39% of the population.

There were 627 households, out of which 38.3% had children under the age of 18 living with them, 75.8% were married couples living together, 3.8% had a female householder with no husband present, and 16.4% were non-families. 13.7% of all households were made up of individuals, and 3.7% had someone living alone who was 65 years of age or older. The average household size was 2.85 and the average family size was 3.15.

In the township the population was spread out, with 27.7% under the age of 18, 7.8% from 18 to 24, 28.3% from 25 to 44, 27.4% from 45 to 64, and 8.8% who were 65 years of age or older. The median age was 38 years. For every 100 females, there were 109.6 males. For every 100 females age 18 and over, there were 107.7 males.

The median income for a household in the township was $58,854, and the median income for a family was $61,164. Males had a median income of $41,458 versus $25,347 for females. The per capita income for the township was $21,130. About 2.7% of families and 3.8% of the population were below the poverty line, including 2.4% of those under age 18 and 6.0% of those age 65 or over.
