= Jeremiah Russell (Minnesota politician) =

American journalist and politician

Member of the Minnesota Territorial House of Representatives
- In office 1849–1849

Personal details
- Born: February 2, 1809 Eaton, New York, U.S.
- Died: June 13, 1885 (aged 76) Sauk Rapids, Minnesota, U.S.
- Occupation: Pioneer, politician, newspaper publisher, Indian trader
- Known for: Founder of Sauk Rapids, Minnesota

Jeremiah Russell (February 2, 1809 – June 13, 1885) was an American pioneer and territorial legislator.

Born in Eaton, New York, Russell moved to Fort Snelling, Wisconsin Territory in 1837. In 1845, he moved to what is now Sauk Rapids, Minnesota and founded the village in 1854. Russell was an Indian trader and stated a newspaper, the "Sauk Rapids Frontierman." In 1849, Russell served in the first Minnesota Territorial Legislature, in the Minnesota Territorial House of Representatives. He also served in various county offices in Benton County, Minnesota. He died in Sauk Rapids, Minnesota.
