= Little Rock, Minnesota =

Little Rock, Minnesota may refer to the following places in the U.S. state of Minnesota:

- Little Rock, Beltrami County, Minnesota, a census-designated place
- Little Rock, Morrison County, Minnesota, an unincorporated community
