= North Benton =

North Benton may refer to:

== Places ==
United States

- North Benton, Minnesota, an unincorporated community
- North Benton, Ohio, an unincorporated community
