= Granite Ledge Township, Benton County, Minnesota =

Township in Minnesota, United States

Granite Ledge Township
- Township
- Location within the state of Minnesota
- Coordinates: 45°46′53″N 93°49′12″W
- Country: United States
- State: Minnesota
- County: Benton

Area
  - Total: 35.4 sq mi (91.7 km^{2})
  - Land: 35.4 sq mi (91.7 km^{2})
  - Water: 0 sq mi (0.0 km^{2})
- Elevation: 1,175 ft (358 m)

Population (2010)
  - Total: 743
  - Density: 21/sq mi (8.1/km^{2})
- Time zone: UTC-6 (Central (CST))
  - Summer (DST): UTC-5 (CDT)
- FIPS code: 27-25298
- GNIS feature ID: 0664325

Granite Ledge Township is a township in Benton County, Minnesota, United States. The population was 743 as of the 2010 census.

Granite Ledge Township was named for the granite rock formations contained within its borders.

== Geography ==
According to the United States Census Bureau, the township has a total area of 35.4 square miles (91.7 km^{2}), all land.

=== Adjacent townships ===
- Lakin Township, Morrison County (north)
- Page Township, Mille Lacs County (northeast)
- Milaca Township, Mille Lacs County (east)
- Milo Township, Mille Lacs County (southeast)
- Maywood Township (south)
- Gilmanton Township (southwest)
- Alberta Township (west)
- Morrill Township, Morrison County (northwest)

== Demographics ==
As of the census of 2000, there were 685 people, 229 households, and 183 families residing in the township. The population density was 19.4 people per square mile (7.5/km^{2}). There were 233 housing units at an average density of 6.6/sq mi (2.6/km^{2}). The racial makeup of the township was 98.83% White, 0.15% Native American, 0.15% Asian, 0.44% from other races, and 0.44% from two or more races. Hispanic or Latino of any race were 0.29% of the population.

There were 229 households, out of which 37.6% had children under the age of 18 living with them, 69.0% were married couples living together, 6.1% had a female householder with no husband present, and 19.7% were non-families. 14.8% of all households were made up of individuals, and 4.4% had someone living alone who was 65 years of age or older. The average household size was 2.99 and the average family size was 3.29.

In the township the population was spread out, with 28.9% under the age of 18, 8.6% from 18 to 24, 29.3% from 25 to 44, 22.5% from 45 to 64, and 10.7% who were 65 years of age or older. The median age was 34 years. For every 100 females, there were 113.4 males. For every 100 females age 18 and over, there were 112.7 males.

The median income for a household in the township was $44,063, and the median income for a family was $47,708. Males had a median income of $30,268 versus $21,458 for females. The per capita income for the township was $17,188. About 9.2% of families and 9.0% of the population were below the poverty line, including 7.1% of those under age 18 and 29.0% of those age 65 or over.
