= North Benton, Minnesota =

Unincorporated community in Minnesota, US

North Benton
- Unincorporated community
- Location within Minnesota Location within the United States
- Coordinates: 45°46′46″N 93°56′46″W
- Country: United States
- State: Minnesota
- County: Benton
- Township: Alberta Township
- Elevation: 1,234 ft (376 m)
- Time zone: UTC-6 (Central (CST))
  - Summer (DST): UTC-5 (CDT)
- ZIP code: 56329
- Area code: 320
- GNIS feature ID: 654850

North Benton is an unincorporated community in Alberta Township, Benton County, Minnesota, United States, located nine miles north of Foley at the intersection of Benton County Roads 3 and 12.
