= Little Rock, Morrison County, Minnesota =

Little Rock, Minnesota
- Unincorporated community
- Location within Minnesota Location within the United States
- Coordinates: 45°49′57″N 94°05′34″W
- Country: United States
- State: Minnesota
- County: Morrison
- Township: Buckman
- Elevation: 1,201 ft (366 m)
- Time zone: UTC-6 (Central (CST))
  - Summer (DST): UTC-5 (CDT)
- ZIP code: 56373
- Area code: 320
- GNIS feature ID: 646909

Little Rock is an unincorporated community in Buckman Township, Morrison County, Minnesota, United States. There are approximately 25 people living in Little Rock. The community is located along State Highway 25 (MN 25) near its junction with Morrison County Road 26, Nature Road. Nearby places include Buckman, Royalton, Rice, and Pierz. Bunker Hill Creek flows through the community.
