= Raymond H. Bares =

American politician (1929–1964)

Raymond Hubert Bares (April 17, 1929 – April 27, 1964) was an American politician and educator.

Bares was born in St. Cloud, Minnesota, and graduated from St. Cloud Technical High School. He served in the United States Army in 1951 and 1952. received his bachelor's degree from St. Cloud State University and his master's degree in social work from Catholic University of America. Bares lived in Sauk Rapids, Minnesota, with his wife and family, He was an elementary teacher and principal. Bares also worked as a counselor for Catholic Charities. Bares served in the Minnesota Senate from 1963 until his death. Bares, his wife, and daughter were killed in an automobile accident in Loogootee, Martin County, Indiana.
