= Ramey, Minnesota =

- Unincorporated community
- Location within Minnesota Location within the United States
- Coordinates: 45°50′07″N 93°56′16″W
- Country: United States
- State: Minnesota
- County: Morrison
- Township: Morrill
- Elevation: 1,286 ft (392 m)
- Time zone: UTC-6 (Central (CST))
  - Summer (DST): UTC-5 (CDT)
- ZIP code: 56364 and 56338
- Area code: 320
- GNIS feature ID: 649802

Ramey is an unincorporated community in Morrill Township, Morrison County, Minnesota, United States. The community is located along 345th Avenue near its junction with Morrison County Road 26, Nature Road. Nearby places include Pierz, Hillman, and Foley.
