= Highway 25 Bridge =

Highway 25 Bridge may refer to:

- Highway 25 Bridge (Minnesota), over the Mississippi River between Monticello and Big Lake, in Minnesota, United States
- Olivier-Charbonneau Bridge, over the Rivière des Prairies, between Laval and Montreal, in Quebec, Canada
