= Rip Repulski =

American baseball player (1928–1993)

- Outfielder
- Born: October 4, 1928; Sauk Rapids, Minnesota, U.S.
- Died: February 10, 1993 (aged 64); Sauk Rapids, Minnesota, U.S.
- Batted: Right Threw: Right

MLB debut
- April 14, 1953, for the St. Louis Cardinals

Last MLB appearance
- June 18, 1961, for the Boston Red Sox

MLB statistics
- Batting average: .269
- Home runs: 106
- Runs batted in: 416
- Stats at Baseball Reference

Teams
- St. Louis Cardinals (1953–1956); Philadelphia Phillies (1957–1958); Los Angeles Dodgers (1959–1960); Boston Red Sox (1960–1961)

Career highlights and awards
- All-Star (1956); World Series champion (1959)

Eldon John "Rip" Repulski (October 4, 1928 – February 10, 1993) was an American professional baseball player, an outfielder in Major League Baseball for the St. Louis Cardinals (1953–56), Philadelphia Phillies (1957–58), Los Angeles Dodgers (1959–60) and Boston Red Sox (1960–61). He batted and threw right-handed, stood 6 feet (1.8 m) tall and weighed 195 pounds (88 kg). He was born in Sauk Rapids, Minnesota.

== Playing career ==
In a nine-season MLB career, Repulski posted a .269 batting average with 830 hits, 106 home runs and 416 RBI in 928 games played. He recorded a .976 fielding percentage playing at all three outfield positions.

A fine defensive player at all outfield positions, Repulski became the regular center fielder for the St. Louis Cardinals in his 1953 rookie season. He appeared in a career-high 153 games and finished in a tie for fourth in the National League Rookie of the Year voting with Bill Bruton, behind Jim Gilliam, Harvey Haddix and Ray Jablonski.

Repulski enjoyed his most productive seasons in 1954 and 1955.

In 1954, he hit 19 home runs and posted career highs in batting average (.283), runs (99), RBI (79) and doubles (39). From June 13–25 he had a string of ten consecutive games in which he collected two or more hits, going 22-for-44 (.500), half for extra bases. After that, he hit in six more consecutive games before going hitless.

In 1955 Repulski posted career highs in home runs (23), walks (49), on-base percentage (.333), slugging average (.467), OPS+ (110), and batting runs (7.7).

He earned an All-Star berth in 1956. Pinch-hitting for National League starting pitcher Bob Friend, he batted against Whitey Ford in the fourth inning and was retired on a foul pop fly to the catcher.

At the end of the '56 season, he was sent to the Philadelphia Phillies in the same trade that brought Del Ennis to St. Louis.

Repulski hit 20 home runs for the Phillies in 1957. A year later, he was traded to the Los Angeles Dodgers along with two other players in exchange for second baseman Sparky Anderson. He appeared in the 1959 World Series with the Los Angeles Dodgers.

Traded by Los Angeles to the Boston Red Sox in the 1960 midseason for Nelson Chittum, Repulski hit a grand slam at Fenway Park in his first American League at bat. He played his last major league season with the Red Sox in 1961.

== Personal life ==
Repulski married the former Mildred M. "Millie" Ellis on December 30, 1950. The couple had one child together, a daughter, Nadine Sue. Rip Repulski died in Sauk Rapids at the age of 64.
