= Mayhew Lake Township, Benton County, Minnesota =

Township in Minnesota, United States

Mayhew Lake Township
- Township
- Location within the state of Minnesota
- Coordinates: 45°41′17″N 94°2′56″W
- Country: United States
- State: Minnesota
- County: Benton

Area
  - Total: 37.0 sq mi (95.8 km^{2})
  - Land: 36.7 sq mi (95.1 km^{2})
  - Water: 0.23 sq mi (0.6 km^{2})
- Elevation: 1,129 ft (344 m)

Population (2010)
  - Total: 831
  - Density: 23/sq mi (8.7/km^{2})
- Time zone: UTC-6 (Central (CST))
  - Summer (DST): UTC-5 (CDT)
- FIPS code: 27-41192
- GNIS feature ID: 0664935

Mayhew Lake Township is a township in Benton County, Minnesota, United States. The population was 831 as of the 2010 census. Mayhew Lake Township was named for George V. Mayhew, an early settler of Benton County who became a state legislator.

== Geography ==
According to the United States Census Bureau, the township has a total area of 37.0 square miles (95.8 km^{2}), of which 36.7 square miles (95.1 km^{2}) is land and 0.23 square miles (0.6 km^{2}), or 0.66%, is water.

=== Unincorporated communities ===
- Fruitville
- Mayhew
- Popple Creek

=== Lakes ===
- Mayhew Lake
- Unnamed Lake

=== Adjacent townships ===
- Graham Township (north)
- Alberta Township (northeast)
- Gilmanton Township (east)
- St. George Township (southeast)
- Minden Township (south)
- Sauk Rapids Township (southwest)
- Watab Township (west)
- Langola Township (northwest)

=== Cemeteries ===
The township contains three cemeteries: Polish Lutheran Church, Saint John's Lutheran Cemetery, and Saint Mary's (Annunciation Catholic Cemetery).

== Demographics ==
As of the census of 2000, there were 804 people, 253 households, and 205 families residing in the township. The population density was 21.8 people per square mile (8.4/km^{2}). There were 260 housing units at an average density of 7.1/sq mi (2.7/km^{2}). The racial makeup of the township was 98.63% White, 0.50% Native American, 0.12% Asian, 0.50% Pacific Islander, and 0.25% from two or more races. Hispanic or Latino of any race were 1.00% of the population.

There were 253 households, out of which 42.7% had children under the age of 18 living with them, 72.7% were married couples living together, 2.8% had a female householder with no husband present, and 18.6% were non-families. 13.8% of all households were made up of individuals, and 6.3% had someone living alone who was 65 years of age or older. The average household size was 3.18 and the average family size was 3.59.

In the township the population was spread out, with 31.7% under the age of 18, 9.6% from 18 to 24, 27.2% from 25 to 44, 22.5% from 45 to 64, and 9.0% who were 65 years of age or older. The median age was 33 years. For every 100 females, there were 106.7 males. For every 100 females age 18 and over, there were 115.3 males.

The median income for a household in the township was $48,750, and the median income for a family was $52,250. Males had a median income of $32,212 versus $23,203 for females. The per capita income for the township was $18,553. About 3.3% of families and 5.1% of the population were below the poverty line, including 5.2% of those under age 18 and 16.4% of those age 65 or over.
