= Sauk Rapids Township, Benton County, Minnesota =

Township in Minnesota, United States

Sauk Rapids Township
- Township
- Location within the state of Minnesota
- Coordinates: 45°36′51″N 94°9′43″W
- Country: United States
- State: Minnesota
- County: Benton

Area
  - Total: 7.6 sq mi (19.6 km^{2})
  - Land: 7.5 sq mi (19.3 km^{2})
  - Water: 0.12 sq mi (0.3 km^{2})
- Elevation: 1,073 ft (327 m)

Population (2010)
  - Total: 584
  - Density: 78/sq mi (30.2/km^{2})
- Time zone: UTC-6 (Central (CST))
  - Summer (DST): UTC-5 (CDT)
- ZIP code: 56379
- Area code: 320
- FIPS code: 27-58702
- GNIS feature ID: 0665560

Sauk Rapids Township is a township in Benton County, Minnesota, United States near the Mississippi River. The population was 584 at the 2010 census.

== History ==
Sauk Rapids Township was organized in 1854. It was named for nearby rapids on the Mississippi River.

== Geography ==
According to the United States Census Bureau, the township has a total area of 7.6 square miles (19.6 km^{2}), of which 7.5 square miles (19.3 km^{2}) is land and 0.12 square miles (0.3 km^{2}), or 1.45%, is water.

It is only about one-third the size of a normal (36-section) township, being bounded on the west by the Mississippi River. The east three-quarters of the city of Sartell, the northwest edge of the city of St. Cloud, and the north half of the city of Sauk Rapids are within this township geographically but are separate entities.

=== Major highway ===
- U.S. Highway 10

=== Lakes ===
- Unnamed Lake

=== Adjacent townships ===
- Watab Township (north)
- Mayhew Lake Township (northeast)
- Minden Township (east)
- Le Sauk Township, Stearns County (west)

=== Cemeteries ===
The township contains four cemeteries: Benton, Pioneer Benton County, Sacred Heart and Trinity.

== Demographics ==
As of the census of 2000, there were 723 people, 270 households, and 201 families residing in the township. The population density was 88.4 inhabitants per square mile (34.1/km^{2}). There were 274 housing units at an average density of 33.5 per square mile (12.9/km^{2}). The racial makeup of the township was 98.34% White, 0.28% African American, 0.14% Native American, 0.55% Asian, 0.28% from other races, and 0.41% from two or more races. Hispanic or Latino of any race were 0.28% of the population.

There were 270 households, out of which 37.0% had children under the age of 18 living with them, 63.7% were married couples living together, 5.9% had a female householder with no husband present, and 25.2% were non-families. 15.6% of all households were made up of individuals, and 5.2% had someone living alone who was 65 years of age or older. The average household size was 2.68 and the average family size was 3.07.

In the township the population was spread out, with 27.0% under the age of 18, 10.9% from 18 to 24, 28.2% from 25 to 44, 24.8% from 45 to 64, and 9.1% who were 65 years of age or older. The median age was 36 years. For every 100 females, there were 98.6 males. For every 100 females age 18 and over, there were 95.6 males.

The median income for a household in the township was $61,161, and the median income for a family was $67,500. Males had a median income of $39,750 versus $24,554 for females. The per capita income for the township was $24,421. About 3.4% of families and 2.2% of the population were below the poverty line, including 0.5% of those under age 18 and 3.2% of those age 65 or over.
