= 1922 Minnesota gubernatorial election =

- November 7, 1922
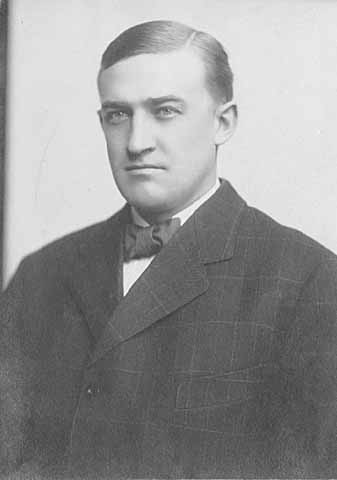

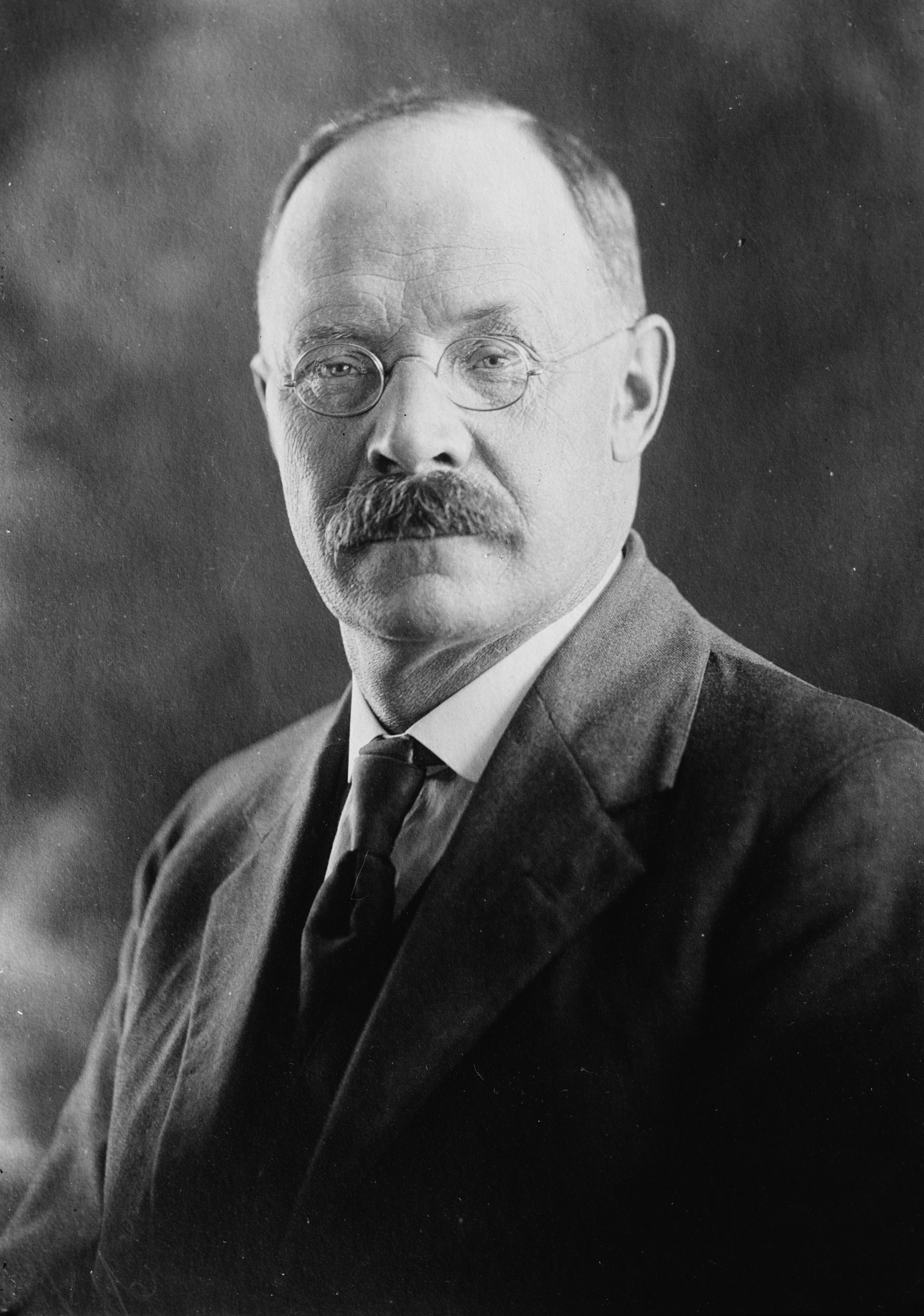

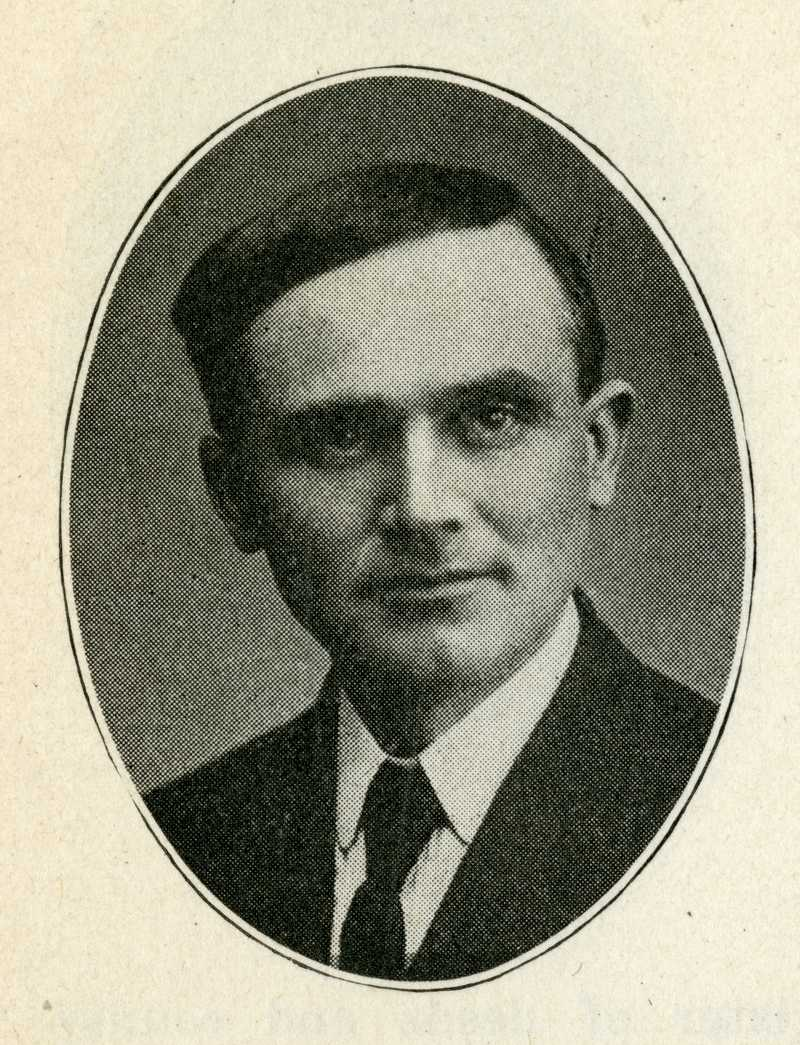
Nominee	J. A. O. Preus	Magnus Johnson	Edward Indrehus
Party	Republican	Farmer–Labor	Democratic
Popular vote	309,756	295,479	79,903
Percentage	45.21%	43.13%	11.66%
- County results Preus: 30–40% 40–50% 50–60% 60–70% Johnson: 40–50% 50–60% 60–70% Indrehus: 30–40%
Governor before election
J. A. O. Preus
Republican
Elected Governor
J. A. O. Preus
Republican

The 1922 Minnesota gubernatorial election took place on November 7, 1922. Incumbent Republican Party of Minnesota J. A. O. Preus defeated Farmer–Labor Party challenger Magnus Johnson and Democratic Party of Minnesota challenger Edward Indrehus.

== Republican primary ==
Preus was challenged by once again by Franklin F. Ellsworth, who had previously run in the 1920 Republican primary. Preus again won the primary.

=== Candidates ===
==== Nominated ====
- J. A. O. Preus, incumbent

=== Eliminated in primary ===
- Franklin F. Ellsworth, U.S. representative

== Farmer-Labor primary ==
The Farmer-Labor Party originally considered a fusion ticket with the Democratic Party. This was opposed by Committee Chairman William Mahoney. The primary was held on June 27, 1922, and was uncontested.

=== Candidates ===
==== Nominated ====
- Magnus Johnson, member of the Minnesota Senate

== Democratic primary ==
Birmingham ran on an anti-Prohibition campaign. He was defeated by Indrehus. Indrehus was opposed to any fusion with the Farmer-Laborites.

=== Candidates ===
==== Nominated ====
- Edward Indrehus, former state representative

=== Eliminated in primary ===
- Merle Birmingham

== Candidates ==
- Edward Indrehus, former member of the Minnesota House of Representatives
- Magnus Johnson, member of the Minnesota Senate
- J. A. O. Preus, incumbent

== Results ==
1922 gubernatorial election, Minnesota
Party	Candidate	Votes	%	±%
Republican	J. A. O. Preus (incumbent)	309,756	45.21%	−7.85%
Farmer–Labor	Magnus Johnson	295,479	43.13%	n/a
Democratic	Edward Indrehus	79,903	11.66%	+1.29%
Majority		14,277	2.08%	
Turnout		685,138		
Republican hold		Swing		

== See also ==
- List of Minnesota gubernatorial elections
