= Mayhew Creek =

Stream in Benton County, Minnesota, U.S.

Coordinates: 45°35′14″N 94°02′33″W

Mayhew Creek is a stream in Benton County, Minnesota, in the United States.

Mayhew Creek was named for George V. Mayhew, a pioneer who settled near the creek.

== See also ==
- List of rivers of Minnesota
