= Graham Township, Benton County, Minnesota =

Township in Minnesota, United States

Graham Township
- Township
- Location within the state of Minnesota
- Coordinates: 45°47′1″N 94°3′57″W
- Country: United States
- State: Minnesota
- County: Benton

Area
  - Total: 36.7 sq mi (95.0 km^{2})
  - Land: 36.7 sq mi (95.0 km^{2})
  - Water: 0 sq mi (0.0 km^{2})
- Elevation: 1,198 ft (365 m)

Population (2010)
  - Total: 582
  - Density: 16/sq mi (6.1/km^{2})
- Time zone: UTC-6 (Central (CST))
  - Summer (DST): UTC-5 (CDT)
- FIPS code: 27-24812
- GNIS feature ID: 0664307

Graham Township is a township in Benton County, Minnesota, United States. The population was 582 as of the 2010 census.

== History ==
Graham Township was named for a pioneer settler.

== Geography ==
According to the United States Census Bureau, the township has a total area of 36.7 square miles (95.0 km^{2}), of which 0.015 square miles (0.04 km^{2}), or 0.04%, is water.

=== Major highway ===
- Minnesota State Highway 25

=== Adjacent townships ===
- Buckman Township, Morrison County (north)
- Morrill Township, Morrison County (northeast)
- Alberta Township (east)
- Gilmanton Township (southeast)
- Mayhew Lake Township (south)
- Watab Township (southwest)
- Langola Township (west)

=== Cemeteries ===
The township contains Graham Cemetery.

== Demographics ==
As of the census of 2000, there were 567 people, 169 households, and 146 families residing in the township. The population density was 15.5 people per square mile (6.0/km^{2}). There were 176 housing units at an average density of 4.8/sq mi (1.9/km^{2}). The racial makeup of the township was 98.77% White, 0.53% Native American, 0.18% Asian, and 0.53% from two or more races. Hispanic or Latino of any race were 0.53% of the population.

There were 169 households, out of which 53.3% had children under the age of 18 living with them, 78.7% were married couples living together, 3.6% had a female householder with no husband present, and 13.6% were non-families. 12.4% of all households were made up of individuals, and 4.7% had someone living alone who was 65 years of age or older. The average household size was 3.36 and the average family size was 3.68.

In the township the population was spread out, with 36.3% under the age of 18, 7.1% from 18 to 24, 27.0% from 25 to 44, 20.8% from 45 to 64, and 8.8% who were 65 years of age or older. The median age was 30 years. For every 100 females, there were 123.2 males. For every 100 females age 18 and over, there were 118.8 males.

The median income for a household in the township was $41,389, and the median income for a family was $45,357. Males had a median income of $30,694 versus $21,591 for females. The per capita income for the township was $14,709. About 8.2% of families and 9.8% of the population were below the poverty line, including 7.7% of those under age 18 and 50.0% of those age 65 or over.
