= Saints Peter and Paul Church (Gilman, Minnesota) =

Historic church in Minnesota, United States

- Church of Sts. Peter and Paul--Catholic
- U.S. National Register of Historic Places
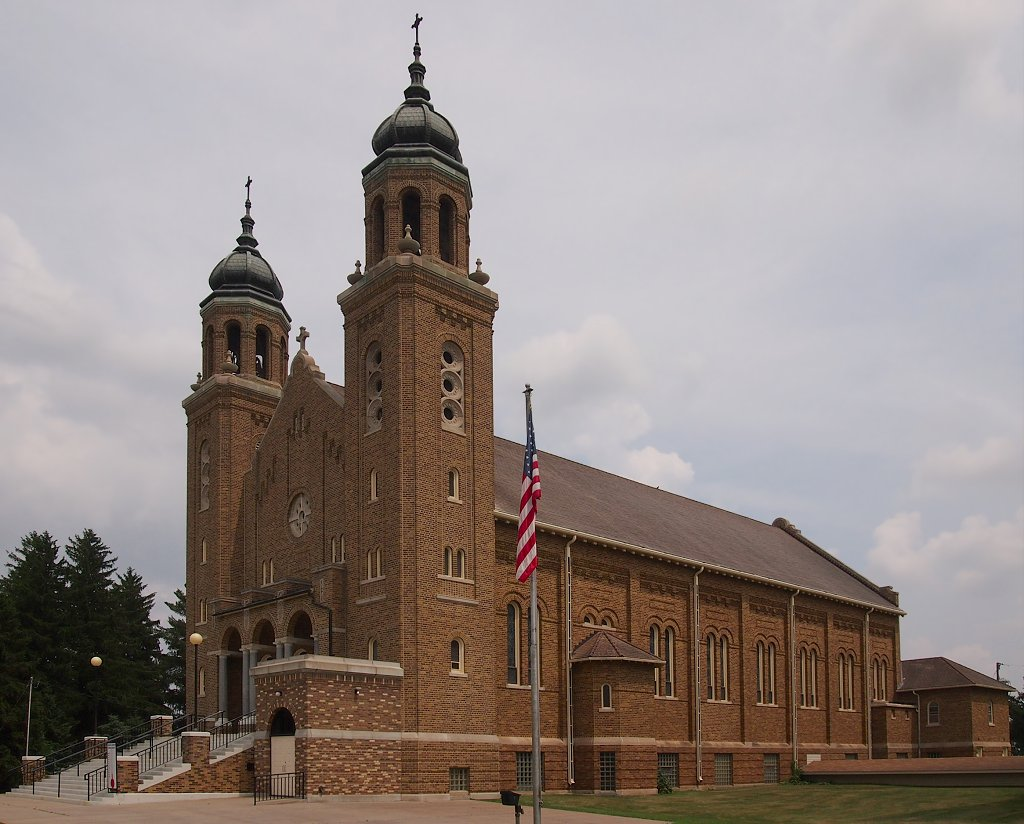
- The Church of Sts. Peter and Paul from the west

- Location within Minnesota Location within the United States
- Interactive map showing the location of St Peter and Paul Church
- Location: State St. Gilman, Minnesota
- Coordinates: 45°44′12″N 93°56′42″W
- Area: less than one acre
- Built: 1909
- Architect: Cordell & Olson
- Architectural style: Beaux Arts
- MPS: Benton County MRA
- NRHP reference No.: 82002932
- Added to NRHP: April 6, 1982

Church of Sts. Peter and Paul—Catholic is a historic church building on State Street in Gilman, Minnesota, United States. It was built in 1930 to serve a Polish-American congregation and designed in the Beaux Arts style by the Minneapolis architectural firm of Victor Cordella & Olson. The first church was a log structure in 1872. It was known as the church of St. Wenceslas. Then a new church was built in the 1880s and was a frame structure known as St. Casimir's Church. The old log church was converted into classrooms. A new school building was built in 1909 and is present today. St. Casimir's church was destroyed by fire in 1891. A new and larger frame building was constructed for the new church. This church building stood north of the present brick building. The school building was completed in 1909. Fr. Vincent Wotzka as pastor had a brick rectory built in 1924. It was also designed by Cordella and Olson. Sometime during these early years, the name of the parish was changed to Saints Peter and Paul. No reason has been found for the change. The church complex was added to the National Register of Historic Places in 1982.
