= Watab Township, Benton County, Minnesota =

Township in Minnesota, United States

Watab Township
- Township
- Location within the state of Minnesota
- Coordinates: 45°41′42″N 94°10′46″W
- Country: United States
- State: Minnesota
- County: Benton

Area
  - Total: 22.4 sq mi (58.0 km^{2})
  - Land: 20.3 sq mi (52.6 km^{2})
  - Water: 2.1 sq mi (5.5 km^{2})
- Elevation: 1,027 ft (313 m)

Population (2010)
  - Total: 3,093
  - Density: 152/sq mi (58.8/km^{2})
- Time zone: UTC-6 (Central (CST))
  - Summer (DST): UTC-5 (CDT)
- FIPS code: 27-68476
- GNIS feature ID: 0665927
- Website: www.watabtownship.com

Watab Township is an urban township in Benton County, Minnesota, United States, located north of the mouth of Watab Creek on the opposite side of the Mississippi River in Sartell. The population was 3,093 as of the 2010 census.

== History ==
Watab Township was organized in 1858. It took its name from the nearby mouth of the Watab River.

== Geography ==
According to the United States Census Bureau, the township has a total area of 22.4 square miles (58.0 km^{2}), of which 20.3 square miles (52.6 km^{2}) is land and 2.1 square miles (5.5 km^{2}), or 9.39%, is water.

It is slightly larger than half of a normal (36-section) township, being bounded on the west by the Mississippi River.

=== Unincorporated communities ===
- Watab

=== Major highway ===
- U.S. Highway 10

=== Lakes ===
- Little Rock Lake (south half)
- Unnamed Lake

=== Adjacent townships ===
- Graham Township (northeast)
- Mayhew Lake Township (east)
- Minden Township (southeast)
- Sauk Rapids Township (south)
- Le Sauk Township, Stearns County (southwest)
- Brockway Township, Stearns County (west)
- Langola Township (northwest)

== Demographics ==
As of the census of 2000, there were 2,920 people, 1,036 households, and 812 families residing in the township. The population density was 143.8 inhabitants per square mile (55.5/km^{2}). There were 1,088 housing units at an average density of 53.6 per square mile (20.7/km^{2}). The racial makeup of the township was 98.70% White, 0.14% African American, 0.14% Native American, 0.34% Asian, 0.17% from other races, and 0.51% from two or more races. Hispanic or Latino of any race were 0.72% of the population.

There were 1,036 households, out of which 42.2% had children under the age of 18 living with them, 66.6% were married couples living together, 7.5% had a female householder with no husband present, and 21.6% were non-families. 15.7% of all households were made up of individuals, and 4.2% had someone living alone who was 65 years of age or older. The average household size was 2.82 and the average family size was 3.17.

In the township the population was spread out, with 29.6% under the age of 18, 7.3% from 18 to 24, 31.7% from 25 to 44, 23.4% from 45 to 64, and 8.0% who were 65 years of age or older. The median age was 36 years. For every 100 females, there were 105.3 males. For every 100 females age 18 and over, there were 103.3 males.

The median income for a household in the township was $50,604, and the median income for a family was $53,542. Males had a median income of $35,750 versus $22,017 for females. The per capita income for the township was $20,554. About 4.8% of families and 6.1% of the population were below the poverty line, including 10.5% of those under age 18 and 3.1% of those age 65 or over.
