= Morrill Township, Morrison County, Minnesota =

Morrill Township, Minnesota
- Township
- Location within the state of Minnesota Morrill Township, Minnesota (the United States)
- Coordinates: 45°51′58″N 93°58′12″W
- Country: United States
- State: Minnesota
- County: Morrison

Area
  - Total: 35.3 sq mi (91.5 km^{2})
  - Land: 35.3 sq mi (91.4 km^{2})
  - Water: 0 sq mi (0.0 km^{2})
- Elevation: 1,309 ft (399 m)

Population (2000)
  - Total: 650
  - Density: 18/sq mi (7.1/km^{2})
- Time zone: UTC-6 (Central (CST))
  - Summer (DST): UTC-5 (CDT)
- FIPS code: 27-44224
- GNIS feature ID: 0665036

Morrill Township is a township in Morrison County, Minnesota, United States. The population was 650 at the 2000 census.

== History ==
Morrill Township was organized in 1881 as Oakwood Township but renamed in 1885 after Ashby C. Morrill, a county official. In 1903, the eastern half of the township was taken to form Lakin Township. The unincorporated communities of Morrill and Ramey are included in the remaining portion of the township.

== Geography ==
According to the United States Census Bureau, the township has a total area of 35.3 square miles (91.5 km^{2}), of which 35.3 square miles (91.4 km^{2}) is land and 0.03% is water.

The unincorporated communities of Morrill and Ramey are located within Morrill Township.

== Demographics ==
As of the census of 2000, there were 650 people, 215 households, and 172 families residing in the township. The population density was 18.4 inhabitants per square mile (7.1/km^{2}). There were 223 housing units at an average density of 6.3 per square mile (2.4/km^{2}). The racial makeup of the township was 99.38% White, 0.15% African American, 0.15% Native American, and 0.31% from two or more races. Hispanic or Latino of any race were 0.92% of the population.

There were 215 households, out of which 45.1% had children under the age of 18 living with them, 72.6% were married couples living together, 2.3% had a female householder with no husband present, and 20.0% were non-families. 14.9% of all households were made up of individuals, and 4.2% had someone living alone who was 65 years of age or older. The average household size was 3.02 and the average family size was 3.37.

In the township the population was spread out, with 30.8% under the age of 18, 11.1% from 18 to 24, 29.1% from 25 to 44, 21.7% from 45 to 64, and 7.4% who were 65 years of age or older. The median age was 32 years. For every 100 females, there were 119.6 males. For every 100 females age 18 and over, there were 121.7 males.

The median income for a household in the township was $42,813, and the median income for a family was $41,750. Males had a median income of $31,875 versus $19,375 for females. The per capita income for the township was $17,604. About 5.8% of families and 7.5% of the population were below the poverty line, including 9.0% of those under age 18 and 8.5% of those age 65 or over.
