= Rice, Minnesota =

City in Minnesota, United States

City of Rice
- City
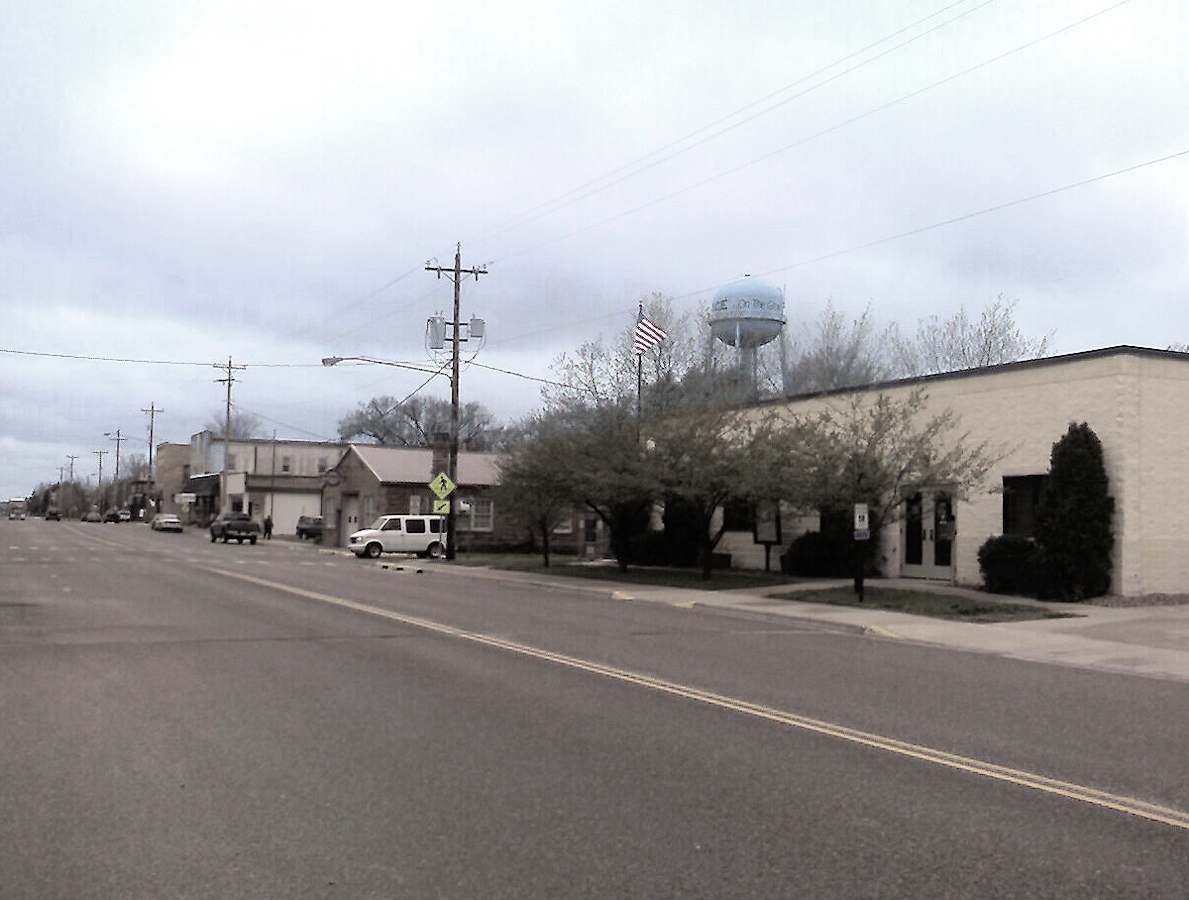
- Downtown Rice

- Seal
- Motto: A past with pride ... a future with promise
- Location of Rice within Benton County and state of Minnesota
- Coordinates: 45°44′40″N 94°13′54″W
- Country: United States
- State: Minnesota
- County: Benton
- Incorporated: July 18, 1890

Area
  - Total: 5.74 sq mi (14.86 km^{2})
  - Land: 5.70 sq mi (14.77 km^{2})
  - Water: 0.039 sq mi (0.10 km^{2})
- Elevation: 1,063 ft (324 m)

Population (2020)
  - Total: 1,975
  - Density: 346.4/sq mi (133.74/km^{2})
- Time zone: UTC-6 (Central (CST))
  - Summer (DST): UTC-5 (CDT)
- ZIP code: 56367
- Area code: 320
- FIPS code: 27-53998
- GNIS feature ID: 2396359
- Website: https://ricemn.us/

Rice is a city in Benton County, Minnesota, United States. The population was 1,975 at the 2020 census. Its zip code also encompasses Graham, Langola, and Watab townships.

Rice is part of the St. Cloud Metropolitan Statistical Area.

== History ==
Originally an Ojibwe territory, Sand Prairie, saw its first settlers of European origin in the autumn of 1844. Under a mandate of the United States government and after the Ojibwe ceded their land in the Treaty of 1837, the Territory of Minnesota was established in 1849. Benton County became one of nine organized counties. The village of Rice was named after Massachusetts born hotelier and mill owner, George T. Rice. Rice migrated to the village of Langola in 1864 to develop the area. In 1877, the Northern Pacific Railroad came through, and George T. Rice hired F.W. Earl to build the Luther hotel. The village of Rice became officially incorporated within Benton County, on July 18, 1890, as a farming community.

On April 14, 1886, Rice, along with Sauk Rapids and St Cloud, were hit by the Sauk Rapids Tornado. It is the deadliest in the history of Minnesota.

In 1993, Rice was named a Tree City USA by The National Arbor Day Foundation.

Rice has been awarded the "Minnesota Star City" designation for economic development.

== Geography ==
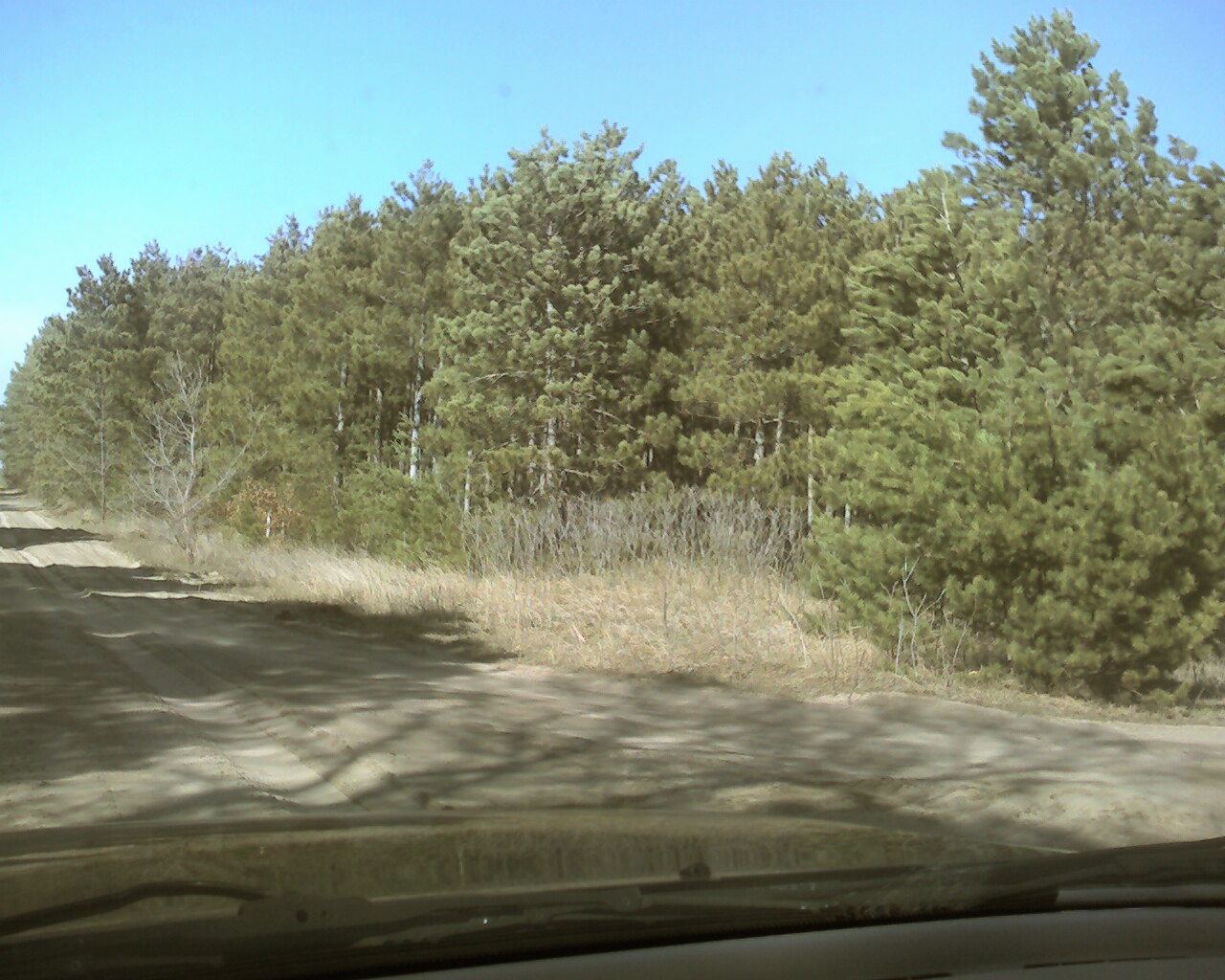
A pine stand in Rice, MN. The city was named a Tree City USA in 1993

According to the United States Census Bureau, the city has a total area of 5.71 square miles (14.79 km^{2}), of which 5.67 square miles (14.69 km^{2}) is land and 0.04 square miles (0.10 km^{2}) is water.

U.S. Highway 10 serves as a main route in the community.

The Mississippi River is located west of Rice, and Little Rock Lake is located east.

The terrain is largely sandy and flat and was historically prairie grassland and oak savannah. Today, numerous pine and poplar intersperse irrigated farm fields with small areas of prairie terrain.

=== Climate ===
Climate data for Rice, Minnesota, 1991–2020 normals, extremes 2006–present
Month	Jan	Feb	Mar	Apr	May	Jun	Jul	Aug	Sep	Oct	Nov	Dec	Year
Record high °F (°C)	52 (11)	62 (17)	80 (27)	85 (29)	95 (35)	100 (38)	100 (38)	101 (38)	93 (34)	85 (29)	76 (24)	51 (11)	101 (38)
Mean daily maximum °F (°C)	19.5 (−6.9)	25.3 (−3.7)	38.1 (3.4)	53.5 (11.9)	67.0 (19.4)	76.3 (24.6)	80.3 (26.8)	78.4 (25.8)	70.8 (21.6)	55.7 (13.2)	39.0 (3.9)	25.4 (−3.7)	52.4 (11.4)
Daily mean °F (°C)	9.6 (−12.4)	14.2 (−9.9)	27.6 (−2.4)	41.4 (5.2)	54.7 (12.6)	65.0 (18.3)	69.2 (20.7)	66.8 (19.3)	58.9 (14.9)	45.3 (7.4)	30.0 (−1.1)	16.9 (−8.4)	41.6 (5.4)
Mean daily minimum °F (°C)	−0.2 (−17.9)	3.2 (−16.0)	17.0 (−8.3)	29.3 (−1.5)	42.4 (5.8)	53.6 (12.0)	58.1 (14.5)	55.1 (12.8)	47.0 (8.3)	34.9 (1.6)	21.0 (−6.1)	8.5 (−13.1)	30.8 (−0.7)
Record low °F (°C)	−38 (−39)	−38 (−39)	−26 (−32)	−2 (−19)	22 (−6)	34 (1)	43 (6)	39 (4)	26 (−3)	10 (−12)	−11 (−24)	−30 (−34)	−38 (−39)
Average precipitation inches (mm)	0.73 (19)	0.77 (20)	1.47 (37)	2.62 (67)	3.50 (89)	4.60 (117)	4.10 (104)	3.94 (100)	3.07 (78)	2.72 (69)	1.52 (39)	1.01 (26)	30.05 (765)
Source 1: NOAA
Source 2: National Weather Service

== Culture ==
=== Historical sites ===
- Immaculate Conception Church
- Old Rice Village Hall

=== Festivals and special activities ===
- Rice Loves Its Kids Month (February)
- Memorial Day Remembrance
- Summerfest (takes place in June)
- Little Rock Lake 4 July Pontoon Parade
- Rice Fun Day and Kiddie Parade (takes place on the third Saturday in August)
- Arts and Craft Show (takes place on the first weekend of September)
- 9/11 Remembrance
- Veteran's Day Remembrance
- Pearl Harbor Remembrance

=== Outdoor activities ===
- Benton Beach on Little Rock Lake is frequented by campers, fishermen and boaters during the summer, and ice fishermen in the winter. The lake itself is maintained by the Little Rock Lake Association.
- Rice has its own game preserve and two taxidermy shops. Meat raffles are a typical fundraising activity.
- Oak Hill Golf Course offers 18 holes of golf
- Rice is also home to Benton Beach Course, an 18-hole disc golf course that was host to the 2008 Minnesota Disc Golf Championship. Another disc golf course, Mississippi Park Course, is in Rice.
- Athletic sports, snowmobiling, all-terrain vehicles, bicycling, and motorcycling are commonly enjoyed activities as well.

=== Churches ===
- Immaculate Conception Catholic Church
- Shepherd of the Pines Lutheran Church
- Graham Methodist Church
- Living Hope Church

=== Other attractions ===
Other attractions include the Great River Bike Trail, several parks, softball fields and an ice skating rink.

== Education ==
=== K–12 ===
The Sauk Rapids–Rice Schools system operates three elementary schools, one middle school, one high school (Sauk Rapids-Rice High School), and has a District Office for Home School. Rice Elementary School is the only one of these schools located within the city of Rice. Many students living in Rice and within the boundaries of the Sauk Rapids–Rice School District attend Royalton schools as their proximity to Rice is significantly closer than most Sauk Rapids–Rice schools. As with other Minnesota school systems, the Sauk Rapids–Rice Schools system has open enrollment. The athletic team for the middle and high school is the Storm

== Demographics ==
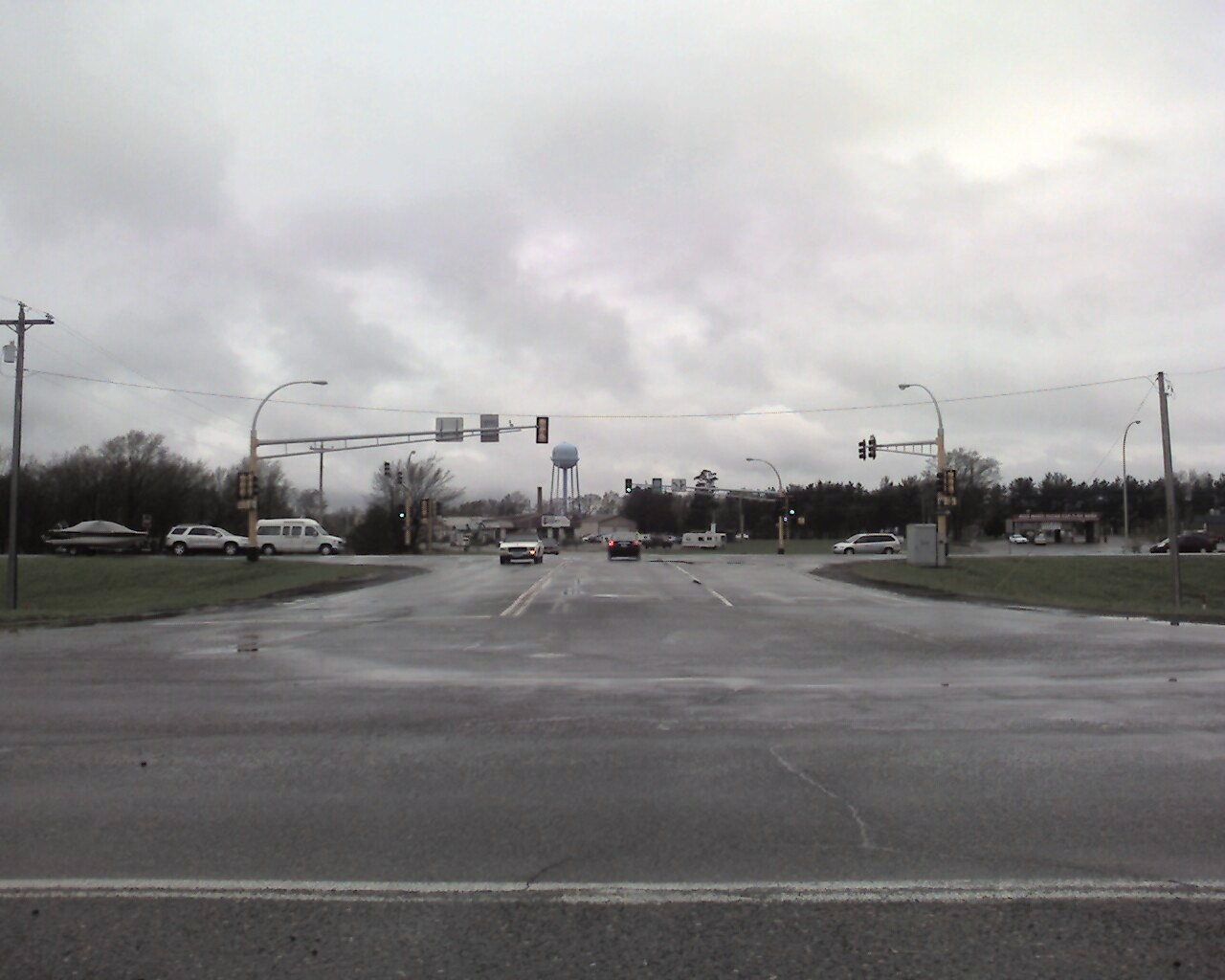
Rice viewed from the Highway 10 and Benton Beach Road/County Road 2 intersection, prior to the construction of the Highway 10 overpass that eliminated the intersection.

Historical population
Census	Pop.	Note	%±
1900	232		—
1910	262		12.9%
1920	315		20.2%
1930	314		−0.3%
1940	324		3.2%
1950	328		1.2%
1960	387		18.0%
1970	366		−5.4%
1980	499		36.3%
1990	610		22.2%
2000	711		16.6%
2010	1,275		79.3%
2020	1,975		54.9%
U.S. Decennial Census

=== 2020 census ===
As of the 2020 census, Rice had a population of 1,975. The median age was 31.0 years. 33.4% of residents were under the age of 18 and 6.5% of residents were 65 years of age or older. For every 100 females there were 105.9 males, and for every 100 females age 18 and over there were 104.5 males age 18 and over.

0.0% of residents lived in urban areas, while 100.0% lived in rural areas.

There were 695 households in Rice, of which 48.1% had children under the age of 18 living in them. Of all households, 53.8% were married-couple households, 17.6% were households with a male householder and no spouse or partner present, and 16.5% were households with a female householder and no spouse or partner present. About 18.1% of all households were made up of individuals and 4.1% had someone living alone who was 65 years of age or older.

There were 708 housing units, of which 1.8% were vacant. The homeowner vacancy rate was 1.5% and the rental vacancy rate was 0.0%.

Racial composition as of the 2020 census
Race	Number	Percent
White	1,862	94.3%
Black or African American	13	0.7%
American Indian and Alaska Native	3	0.2%
Asian	3	0.2%
Native Hawaiian and Other Pacific Islander	1	0.1%
Some other race	7	0.4%
Two or more races	86	4.4%
Hispanic or Latino (of any race)	44	2.2%

=== 2010 census ===
As of the census of 2010, there were 1,275 people, 462 households, and 340 families living in the city. The population density was 224.9 inhabitants per square mile (86.8/km^{2}). There were 490 housing units at an average density of 86.4 per square mile (33.4/km^{2}). The racial makeup of the city was 97.3% White, 0.2% African American, 0.2% Native American, 0.1% Asian, 0.3% from other races, and 1.9% from two or more races. Hispanic or Latino of any race were 0.7% of the population.

There were 462 households, of which 49.1% had children under the age of 18 living with them, 59.3% were married couples living together, 7.8% had a female householder with no husband present, 6.5% had a male householder with no wife present, and 26.4% were non-families. 19.5% of all households were made up of individuals, and 3.9% had someone living alone who was 65 years of age or older. The average household size was 2.76 and the average family size was 3.18.

The median age in the city was 28.8 years. 32.4% of residents were under the age of 18; 7.5% were between the ages of 18 and 24; 39.6% were from 25 to 44; 15.7% were from 45 to 64; and 4.8% were 65 years of age or older. The gender makeup of the city was 52.7% male and 47.3% female.

=== 2000 census ===
As of the census of 2000, there were 711 people, 247 households, and 185 families living in the city. The population density was 118.8 inhabitants per square mile (45.9/km^{2}). There were 250 housing units at an average density of 41.8 per square mile (16.1/km^{2}). The racial makeup of the city was 98.87% White, 0.70% Native American, 0.14% from other races, and 0.28% from two or more races. Hispanic or Latino of any race were 0.28% of the population.

There were 247 households, out of which 48.2% had children under the age of 18 living with them, 62.8% were married couples living together, 7.7% had a female householder with no husband present, and 25.1% were non-families. 19.4% of all households were made up of individuals, and 4.9% had someone living alone who was 65 years of age or older. The average household size was 2.88 and the average family size was 3.35.

In the city, the population was spread out, with 35.4% under the age of 18, 9.7% from 18 to 24, 35.3% from 25 to 44, 15.3% from 45 to 64, and 4.2% who were 65 years of age or older. The median age was 28 years. For every 100 females, there were 102.6 males. For every 100 females age 18 and over, there were 101.3 males.

The median income for a household in the city was $48,173, and the median income for a family was $52,222. Males had a median income of $32,794 versus $22,279 for females. The per capita income for the city was $16,882. About 5.2% of families and 6.3% of the population were below the poverty line, including 7.1% of those under age 18 and 33.3% of those age 65 or over.

== Transportation ==
Amtrak’s Empire Builder, which operates between Seattle/Portland and Chicago, passes through the town on BNSF tracks, but makes no stop. The nearest station is located in St. Cloud, 16 miles (26 km) to the south.
