= Benton County, Minnesota =

County in Minnesota, United States

- County
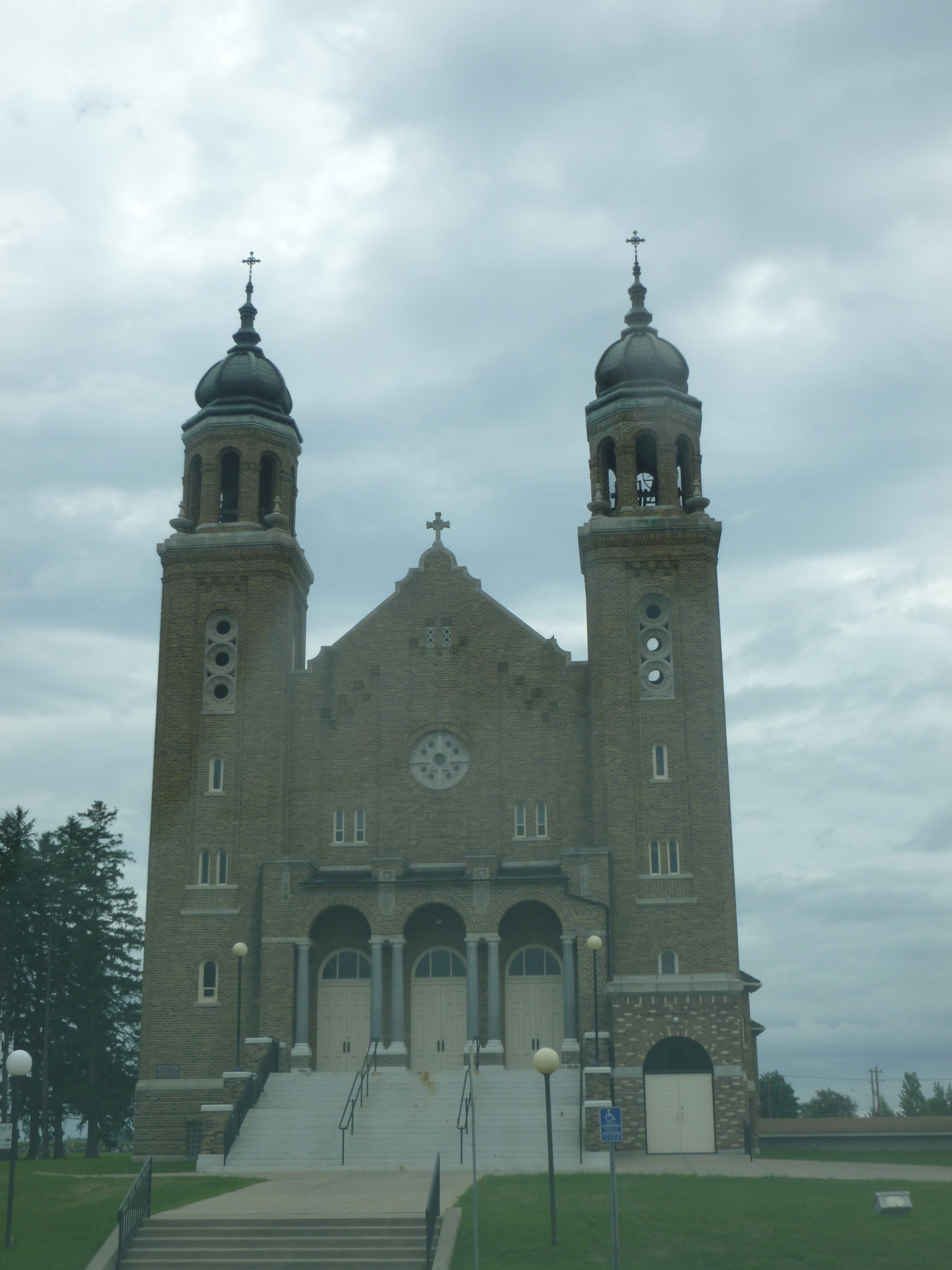
- Church of Saints Peter and Paul in Gilman, Minnesota.

- Seal

- Location within the U.S. state of Minnesota
- Coordinates: 45°42′N 94°00′W
- Country: United States
- State: Minnesota
- Founded: October 27, 1849 (created); 1850 (organized)
- Named for: Thomas Hart Benton
- Seat: Foley
- Largest city: Sauk Rapids

Area
  - Total: 413 sq mi (1,070 km^{2})
  - Land: 408 sq mi (1,060 km^{2})
  - Water: 4.8 sq mi (12 km^{2}) 1.2%

Population (2020)
  - Total: 41,379
  - Estimate (2025): 41,744 ▲
  - Density: 97.9/sq mi (37.8/km^{2})
- Time zone: UTC−6 (Central)
  - Summer (DST): UTC−5 (CDT)
- Congressional district: 6th
- Website: www.co.benton.mn.us

Benton County is a county in the East Central part of the U.S. state of Minnesota. As of the 2020 census, the population was 41,379. Its county seat is Foley.

Benton County is part of the St. Cloud Metropolitan Statistical Area, which is also included in the Minneapolis-St. Paul Combined Statistical Area.

== History ==
Established in 1849 and organized in 1850, the county is one of the oldest in Minnesota. It was named for Thomas Hart Benton, a United States Senator from Missouri. Its county seat for many years was Sauk Rapids, at the confluence of the Sauk and Mississippi Rivers. The county seat moved to Watab in 1856 and returned to Sauk Rapids in 1859. Sauk Rapids became the terminus of a railroad line in 1874, but was destroyed by a tornado in 1886. In 1897 the county seat moved to Foley, where it remains. As St. Cloud expanded into a metropolitan area, the southern part of Benton County became a suburb.

== Geography ==
The Mississippi River flows southeast along Benton County's western border, and the Platte River flows south through the county's northwest corner, discharging into the Mississippi at the county's western border. The terrain consists of low rolling hills, wooded or devoted to agriculture. It generally slopes to the south and east, although its western portion slopes into the river valleys. The county's highest point is a small hill near the midpoint of the northern border, 1 mi (1.6 km) north of Brennyville, at 1,311 ft (400 m) ASL. The county has a total area of 413 square miles (1,070 km^{2}), of which 408 square miles (1,060 km^{2}) is land and 4.8 square miles (12 km^{2}) (1.2%) is water. It is the fifth-smallest county in Minnesota by land area and fourth-smallest by total area.

Soils of Benton County

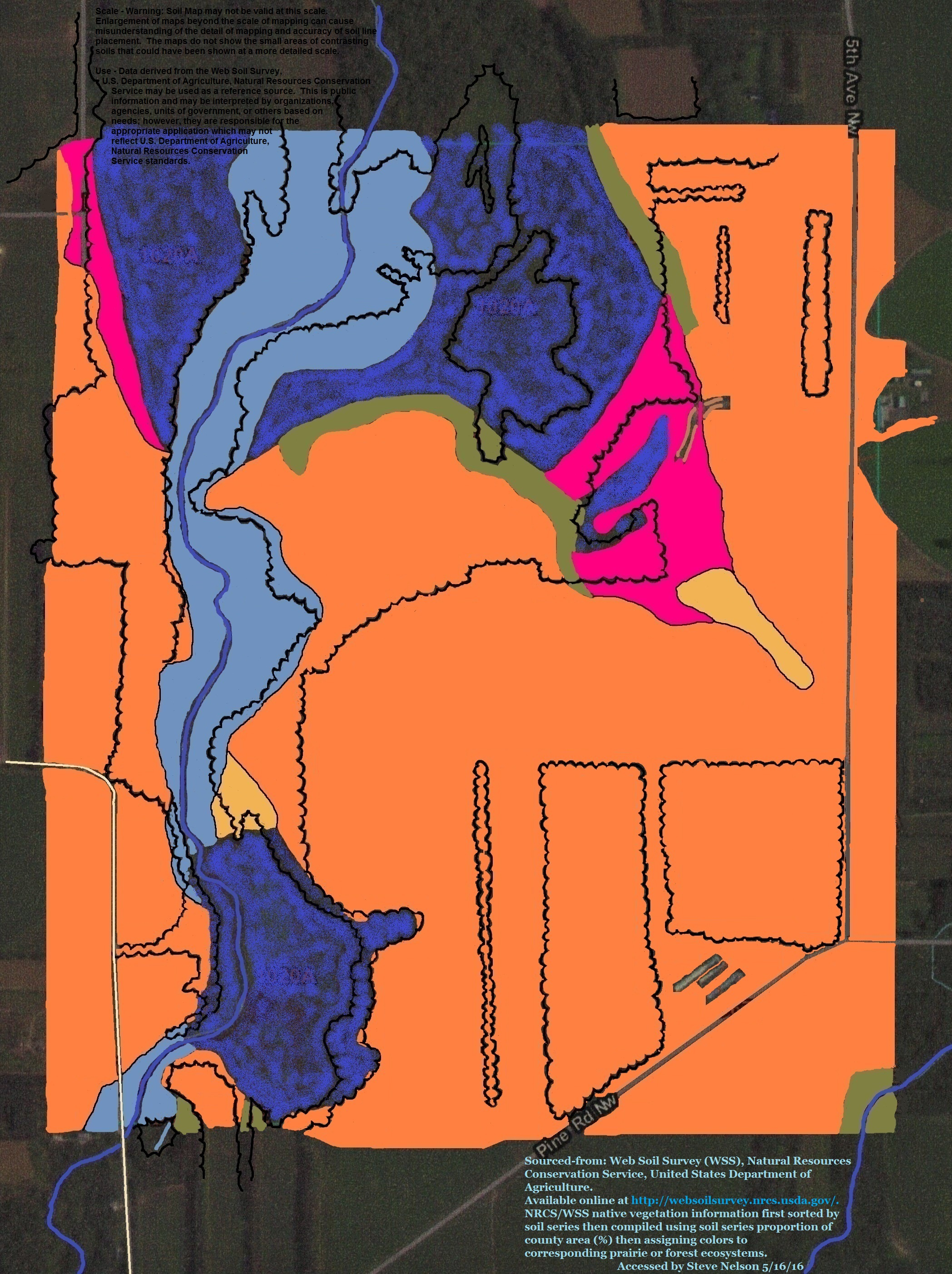
Soils of Sartell WMA neighborhood

=== Major highways ===
- U.S. Highway 10
- Minnesota State Highway 15
- Minnesota State Highway 23
- Minnesota State Highway 25
- Minnesota State Highway 95

=== Adjacent counties ===
- Mille Lacs - east
- Sherburne - south
- Stearns - west
- Morrison - north

=== Lakes ===
- Donovan Lake (part)
- Graham Lake
- Little Rock Lake
- Mayhew Lake

=== Protected areas ===
- Benlacs State Wildlife Management Area (part)
- Bibles State Wildlife Management Area
- Englund Ecotone Scientific and Natural Area
- Sartell State Wildlife Management Area
- Wisneski State Wildlife Management Area

== Climate and weather ==
Foley, Minnesota

Climate chart (precipitation, max. and min. temperature)
J	F	M	A	M	J	J	A	S	O	N	D
0.7 21 2	0.6 27 7	1.6 39 20	2.6 56 33	3 69 44	4.2 78 54	3.3 82 59	3.8 80 56	3.5 70 47	2.5 57 35	1.4 39 22	0.8 25 7
- █ Average max. and min. temperatures in °F
- █ Precipitation totals in inches
- Source: The Weather Channel
Metric conversion
J	F	M	A	M	J	J	A	S	O	N	D
17 −6 −17	16 −3 −14	39 4 −7	65 13 1	75 21 7	106 26 12	84 28 15	96 27 13	88 21 8	63 14 2	35 4 −6	21 −4 −14
- █ Average max. and min. temperatures in °C
- █ Precipitation totals in mm

In recent years, average temperatures in the county seat of Foley have ranged from a low of 2 °F (−17 °C) in January to a high of 82 °F (28 °C) in July, although a record low of −43 °F (−42 °C) was recorded in January 1977 and a record high of 107 °F (42 °C) was recorded in July 1936. Average monthly precipitation ranged from 0.62 inches (16 mm) in February to 4.17 inches (106 mm) in June.

== Demographics ==
Historical population
Census	Pop.	Note	%±
1850	418		—
1860	627		50.0%
1870	1,558		148.5%
1880	3,012		93.3%
1890	6,284		108.6%
1900	9,912		57.7%
1910	11,615		17.2%
1920	14,073		21.2%
1930	15,056		7.0%
1940	16,106		7.0%
1950	15,911		−1.2%
1960	17,287		8.6%
1970	20,841		20.6%
1980	25,187		20.9%
1990	30,185		19.8%
2000	34,226		13.4%
2010	38,451		12.3%
2020	41,379		7.6%
2025 (est.)	41,744	▲	0.9%
U.S. Decennial Census; 1790-1960 1900-1990; 1990-2000 2010-2020

=== Racial and ethnic composition ===
Benton County, Minnesota – Racial and ethnic composition Note: the US Census treats Hispanic/Latino as an ethnic category. This table excludes Latinos from the racial categories and assigns them to a separate category. Hispanics/Latinos may be of any race.
Race / Ethnicity (NH = Non-Hispanic)	Pop 1980	Pop 1990	Pop 2000	Pop 2010	Pop 2020	% 1980	% 1990	% 2000	% 2010	% 2020
White alone (NH)	24,887	29,729	32,768	35,939	35,821	98.81%	98.49%	95.74%	93.47%	86.57%
Black or African American alone (NH)	34	61	262	738	1,991	0.13%	0.20%	0.77%	1.92%	4.81%
Native American or Alaska Native alone (NH)	55	123	162	146	184	0.22%	0.41%	0.47%	0.38%	0.44%
Asian alone (NH)	60	126	390	420	463	0.24%	0.42%	1.14%	1.09%	1.12%
Native Hawaiian or Pacific Islander alone (NH)	x	x	16	4	8	x	x	0.05%	0.01%	0.02%
Other race alone (NH)	39	7	33	15	109	0.15%	0.02%	0.10%	0.04%	0.26%
Mixed race or Multiracial (NH)	x	x	288	557	1,587	x	x	0.84%	1.45%	3.84%
Hispanic or Latino (any race)	112	139	307	632	1,216	0.44%	0.46%	0.90%	1.64%	2.94%
Total	25,187	30,185	34,226	38,451	41,379	100.00%	100.00%	100.00%	100.00%	100.00%

=== 2020 census ===
As of the 2020 census, the county had a population of 41,379. The median age was 36.9 years. 25.2% of residents were under the age of 18 and 14.9% of residents were 65 years of age or older. For every 100 females there were 100.3 males, and for every 100 females age 18 and over there were 98.8 males age 18 and over.

The racial makeup of the county was 87.4% White, 4.9% Black or African American, 0.6% American Indian and Alaska Native, 1.1% Asian, <0.1% Native Hawaiian and Pacific Islander, 1.2% from some other race, and 4.9% from two or more races. Hispanic or Latino residents of any race comprised 2.9% of the population.

55.0% of residents lived in urban areas, while 45.0% lived in rural areas.

There were 16,479 households in the county, of which 31.7% had children under the age of 18 living in them. Of all households, 47.0% were married-couple households, 19.9% were households with a male householder and no spouse or partner present, and 23.8% were households with a female householder and no spouse or partner present. About 29.0% of all households were made up of individuals and 10.6% had someone living alone who was 65 years of age or older.

There were 17,315 housing units, of which 4.8% were vacant. Among occupied housing units, 66.7% were owner-occupied and 33.3% were renter-occupied. The homeowner vacancy rate was 0.9% and the rental vacancy rate was 4.7%.

=== 2010 census ===
As of the 2010 census, the population was 38,451.

=== 2000 census ===
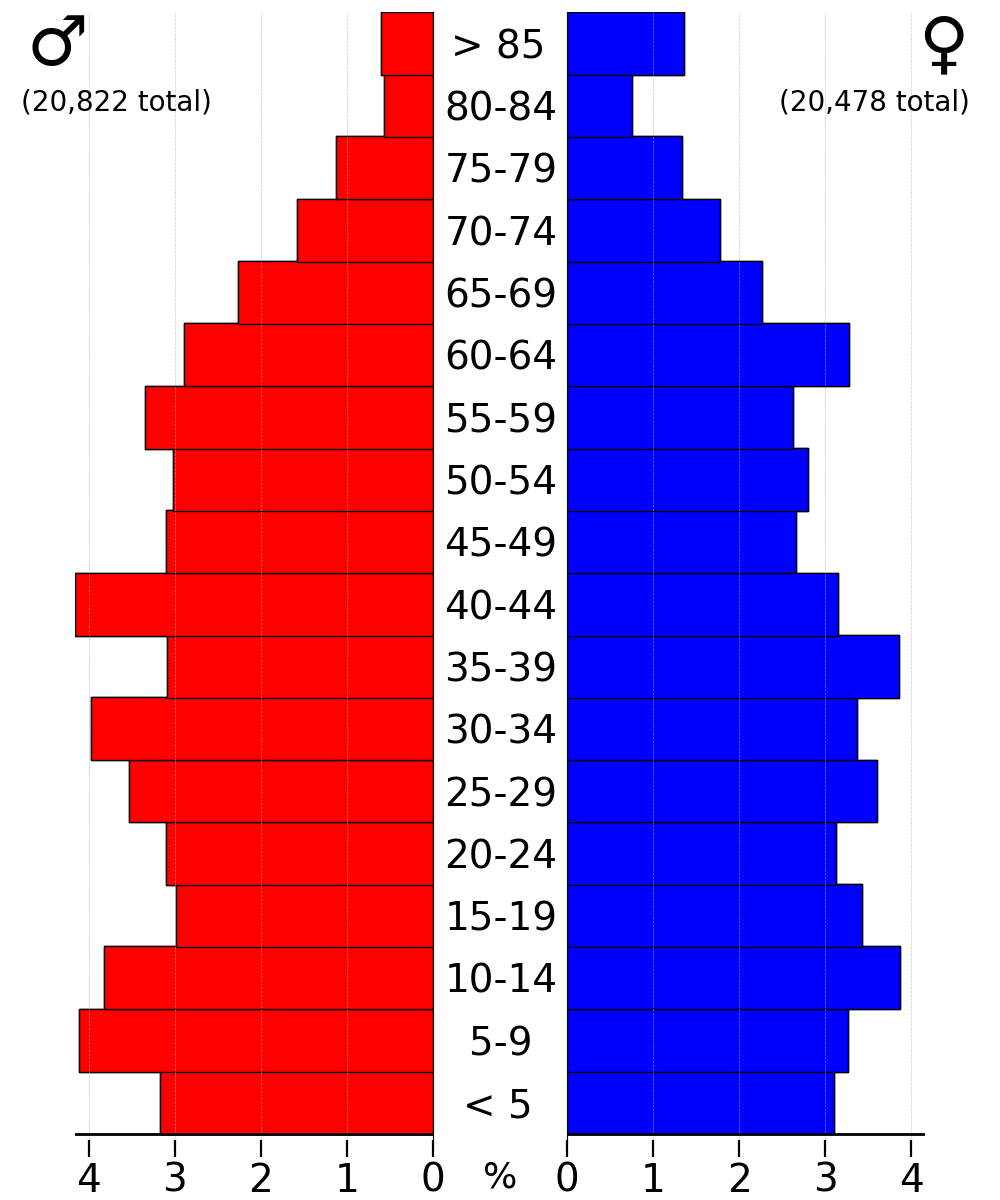
2022 US Census population pyramid for Benton County, from ACS 5-year estimates

As of the census of 2000, there were 34,226 people, 13,065 households, and 8,518 families in the county. The population density was 83.9 per square mile (32.4/km^{2}). There were 13,460 housing units at an average density of 33 per square mile (13/km^{2}). The racial makeup of the county was 96.22% White, 0.78% Black or African American, 0.52% Native American, 1.15% Asian, 0.05% Pacific Islander, 0.35% from other races, and 0.94% from two or more races. 0.90% of the population were Hispanic or Latino of any race. 47.8% were of German, 12.1% Polish and 8.8% Norwegian ancestry.

There were 13,065 households, out of which 35.30% had children under the age of 18 living with them, 52.10% were married couples living together, 8.80% had a female householder with no husband present, and 34.80% were non-families. 25.80% of all households were made up of individuals, and 8.90% had someone living alone who was 65 years of age or older. The average household size was 2.56 and the average family size was 3.14.

The county population contained 27.10% under the age of 18, 12.20% from 18 to 24, 31.00% from 25 to 44, 18.70% from 45 to 64, and 11.00% who were 65 years of age or older. The median age was 32 years. For every 100 females, there were 99.60 males. For every 100 females age 18 and over, there were 96.30 males.

The median income for a household in the county was $41,968, and the median income for a family was $51,277. Males had a median income of $33,214 versus $22,737 for females. The per capita income for the county was $19,008. About 4.50% of families and 7.10% of the population were below the poverty line, including 6.30% of those under age 18 and 12.60% of those age 65 or over.

== Communities ==
=== Cities ===
- Foley (county seat)
- Gilman
- Rice
- Royalton (partial)
- St. Cloud (partial)
- Sartell (partial)
- Sauk Rapids

=== Townships ===
- Alberta
- Gilmanton
- Glendorado
- Graham
- Granite Ledge
- Langola
- Mayhew Lake
- Maywood
- Minden
- Saint George
- Sauk Rapids
- Watab

=== Census-designated place ===
- Ronneby

=== Unincorporated communities ===
- Brennyville
- Duelm
- Fruitville
- Glendorado
- Granite Ledge
- Jakeville
- Mayhew
- North Benton
- Oak Park
- Parent
- Popple Creek
- Rum River
- Silver Corners
- Watab

=== Ghost towns ===
- Estes Brook
- Minden

== Government and politics ==
Benton County voters have tended to vote Republican for the past few decades. In 2016 Donald Trump won the county with 64.2%, the highest share of the vote for any presidential candidate since Franklin D. Roosevelt in 1932.

United States presidential election results for Benton County, Minnesota
Year	Republican		Democratic		Third party(ies)	
Year	No.	%	No.	%	No.	%
1892	426	25.63%	577	34.72%	659	39.65%
1896	778	46.61%	867	51.95%	24	1.44%
1900	849	51.58%	751	45.63%	46	2.79%
1904	1,205	71.90%	433	25.84%	38	2.27%
1908	1,001	54.11%	765	41.35%	84	4.54%
1912	468	24.38%	562	29.27%	890	46.35%
1916	1,020	49.09%	945	45.48%	113	5.44%
1920	2,920	78.83%	554	14.96%	230	6.21%
1924	1,629	41.90%	572	14.71%	1,687	43.39%
1928	2,373	46.29%	2,732	53.30%	21	0.41%
1932	1,329	24.84%	3,901	72.92%	120	2.24%
1936	1,783	30.67%	3,111	53.52%	919	15.81%
1940	3,491	55.76%	2,742	43.79%	28	0.45%
1944	2,988	56.76%	2,258	42.90%	18	0.34%
1948	2,297	38.19%	3,632	60.38%	86	1.43%
1952	3,856	59.54%	2,587	39.95%	33	0.51%
1956	3,591	57.77%	2,609	41.97%	16	0.26%
1960	3,324	44.23%	4,175	55.56%	16	0.21%
1964	2,818	37.47%	4,679	62.22%	23	0.31%
1968	3,470	43.29%	4,022	50.17%	524	6.54%
1972	4,652	49.35%	4,282	45.43%	492	5.22%
1976	4,099	37.38%	6,235	56.86%	631	5.75%
1980	5,513	46.79%	5,272	44.75%	997	8.46%
1984	6,830	57.48%	4,922	41.42%	131	1.10%
1988	6,060	50.33%	5,861	48.68%	119	0.99%
1992	5,053	35.16%	5,156	35.88%	4,162	28.96%
1996	4,835	36.54%	6,006	45.39%	2,392	18.08%
2000	7,663	51.40%	6,009	40.31%	1,236	8.29%
2004	10,043	54.63%	8,059	43.84%	282	1.53%
2008	10,338	53.46%	8,454	43.71%	547	2.83%
2012	10,849	55.30%	8,173	41.66%	597	3.04%
2016	12,872	64.17%	5,640	28.12%	1,546	7.71%
2020	14,382	64.61%	7,280	32.70%	598	2.69%
2024	15,260	66.86%	7,084	31.04%	480	2.10%

County Board of Commissioners
Position	Name	District
Commissioner and Chairperson	Scott Johnson	District 1
Commissioner	Ed Popp	District 2
Commissioner	Steve Heinen	District 3
Commissioner and Vice Chair	Jared J. Gapinski	District 4
Commissioner and Chairperson	Beth Schlangen	District 5

State Legislature (2022)
Position	Name	Affiliation	District
Senate	Jeff Howe	Republican	District 13
Senate	Aric Putnam	Democrat	District 14
Senate	Andrew Mathews	Republican	District 15
House of Representatives	Tim O'Driscoll	Republican	District 13B
House of Representatives	Dan Wolgamott	Democrat	District 14B
House of Representatives	Shane Mekeland	Republican	District 15B

U.S Congress (2022)
Position	Name	Affiliation	District
House of Representatives	Tom Emmer	Republican	6th
Senate	Amy Klobuchar	Democrat	N/A
Senate	Tina Smith	Democrat	N/A

== See also ==
- Great River Regional Library
- National Register of Historic Places listings in Benton County, Minnesota
