= Buckman Township, Morrison County, Minnesota =

Buckman Township, Minnesota
- Township
- Location within the state of Minnesota Buckman Township, Minnesota (the United States)
- Coordinates: 45°52′9″N 94°6′27″W
- Country: United States
- State: Minnesota
- County: Morrison

Area
  - Total: 54.6 sq mi (141.4 km^{2})
  - Land: 54.6 sq mi (141.3 km^{2})
  - Water: 0.039 sq mi (0.1 km^{2})
- Elevation: 1,180 ft (360 m)

Population (2000)
  - Total: 717
  - Density: 13/sq mi (5.1/km^{2})
- Time zone: UTC-6 (Central (CST))
  - Summer (DST): UTC-5 (CDT)
- ZIP code: 56317
- Area code: 320
- FIPS code: 27-08434
- GNIS feature ID: 0663694

Buckman Township is a township in Morrison County, Minnesota, United States. The population was 717 at the 2000 census.

Buckman Township was organized in 1874, and named for Clarence B. Buckman, a pioneer settler.

== Geography ==
According to the United States Census Bureau, the township has a total area of 54.6 square miles (141 km^{2}), of which 54.5 square miles (141 km^{2}) is land and 0.1 square miles (0.26 km^{2}) (0.09%) is water.

== Demographics ==
As of the census of 2000, there were 717 people, 220 households, and 185 families residing in the township. The population density was 13.1 inhabitants per square mile (5.1/km^{2}). There were 227 housing units at an average density of 4.2 per square mile (1.6/km^{2}). The racial makeup of the township was 99.58% White, 0.28% Asian, and 0.14% from two or more races.

There were 220 households, out of which 45.9% had children under the age of 18 living with them, 73.6% were married couples living together, 2.7% had a female householder with no husband present, and 15.9% were non-families. 12.7% of all households were made up of individuals, and 3.2% had someone living alone who was 65 years of age or older. The average household size was 3.26 and the average family size was 3.59.

In the township the population was spread out, with 33.6% under the age of 18, 9.3% from 18 to 24, 29.1% from 25 to 44, 19.5% from 45 to 64, and 8.4% who were 65 years of age or older. The median age was 30 years. For every 100 females, there were 122.7 males. For every 100 females age 18 and over, there were 124.5 males.

The median income for a household in the township was $45,489, and the median income for a family was $46,848. Males had a median income of $28,846 versus $24,306 for females. The per capita income for the township was $16,638. About 4.6% of families and 6.8% of the population were below the poverty line, including 4.9% of those under age 18 and 8.5% of those age 65 or over.
