= Gilman, Minnesota =

City in Minnesota, United States

City of Gilman
- City
- Location of Gilman within Benton County and state of Minnesota
- Coordinates: 45°44′07″N 93°56′55″W
- Country: United States
- State: Minnesota
- County: Benton

Area
  - Total: 0.48 sq mi (1.24 km^{2})
  - Land: 0.48 sq mi (1.24 km^{2})
  - Water: 0 sq mi (0.00 km^{2})
- Elevation: 1,191 ft (363 m)

Population (2020)
  - Total: 226
  - Density: 472.0/sq mi (182.23/km^{2})
- Time zone: UTC-6 (Central (CST))
  - Summer (DST): UTC-5 (CDT)
- ZIP code: 56333
- Area code: 320
- FIPS code: 27-23804
- GNIS feature ID: 2394899
- Website: https://www.cityofgilman.org/

Gilman is a city in Benton County, Minnesota, United States. As of the 2020 census, Gilman had a population of 226. It is part of the St. Cloud Metropolitan Statistical Area.

== Geography ==
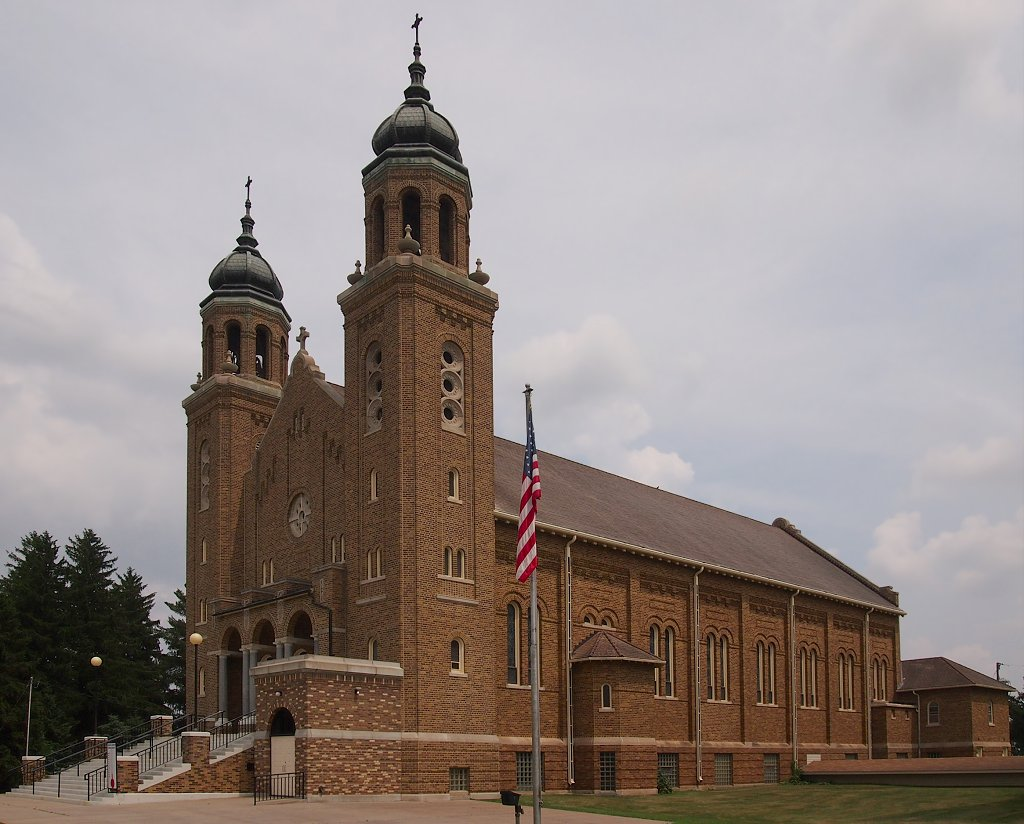
Sts. Peter and Paul Catholic Church

According to the United States Census Bureau, the city has a total area of 0.53 square miles (1.37 km^{2}), all land.

Minnesota State Highway 25 and Benton County Road 3 are two of the main routes in the community.

== Demographics ==
Historical population
Census	Pop.	Note	%±
1960	146		—
1970	111		−24.0%
1980	156		40.5%
1990	192		23.1%
2000	215		12.0%
2010	224		4.2%
2020	226		0.9%
U.S. Decennial Census

=== 2010 census ===
As of the census of 2010, there were 224 people, 86 households, and 62 families living in the city. The population density was 422.6 inhabitants per square mile (163.2/km^{2}). There were 91 housing units at an average density of 171.7 per square mile (66.3/km^{2}). The racial makeup of the city was 100.0% White.

There were 86 households, of which 40.7% had children under the age of 18 living with them, 59.3% were married couples living together, 9.3% had a female householder with no husband present, 3.5% had a male householder with no wife present, and 27.9% were non-families. 20.9% of all households were made up of individuals, and 4.7% had someone living alone who was 65 years of age or older. The average household size was 2.60 and the average family size was 3.10.

The median age in the city was 30 years. 29.5% of residents were under the age of 18; 9.4% were between the ages of 18 and 24; 30.4% were from 25 to 44; 21% were from 45 to 64; and 9.8% were 65 years of age or older. The gender makeup of the city was 51.3% male and 48.7% female.

=== 2000 census ===
As of the census of 2000, there were 215 people, 85 households, and 60 families living in the city. The population density was 414.4 inhabitants per square mile (160.0/km^{2}). There were 87 housing units at an average density of 167.7 per square mile (64.7/km^{2}). The racial makeup of the city was 99.07% White, 0.47% Asian, and 0.47% from two or more races.

There were 85 households, out of which 34.1% had children under the age of 18 living with them, 61.2% were married couples living together, 4.7% had a female householder with no husband present, and 29.4% were non-families. 25.9% of all households were made up of individuals, and 15.3% had someone living alone who was 65 years of age or older. The average household size was 2.53 and the average family size was 2.95.

In the city, the population was spread out, with 24.7% under the age of 18, 7.9% from 18 to 24, 28.8% from 25 to 44, 21.9% from 45 to 64, and 16.7% who were 65 years of age or older. The median age was 37 years. For every 100 females, there were 82.2 males. For every 100 females age 18 and over, there were 84.1 males.

The median income for a household in the city was $49,063, and the median income for a family was $52,500. Males had a median income of $30,694 versus $22,188 for females. The per capita income for the city was $17,641. About 4.5% of families and 9.9% of the population were below the poverty line, including none of those under the age of eighteen and 42.3% of those 65 or over.
