= Sauk Rapids, Minnesota =

City in Minnesota, United States

Sauk Rapids
- City
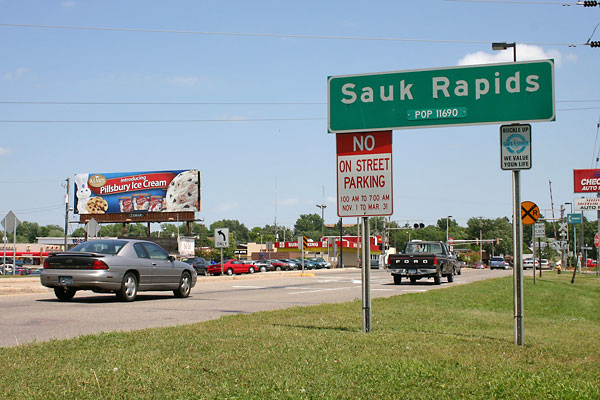

- Location of Sauk Rapids within Benton County and state of Minnesota
- Coordinates: 45°35′53″N 94°09′14″W
- Country: United States
- State: Minnesota
- County: Benton

Area
  - Total: 6.52 sq mi (16.89 km^{2})
  - Land: 6.29 sq mi (16.28 km^{2})
  - Water: 0.24 sq mi (0.61 km^{2})
- Elevation: 1,079 ft (329 m)

Population (2020)
  - Total: 13,862
  - Density: 2,204.6/sq mi (851.22/km^{2})
- Time zone: UTC-6 (CST)
  - Summer (DST): UTC-5 (CDT)
- ZIP code: 56379
- Area code: 320
- FIPS code: 27-58684
- GNIS feature ID: 2396542
- Website: ci.sauk-rapids.mn.us

Sauk Rapids (/sɔːk/ SAWK) is a city in Benton County, Minnesota, United States. The population was 13,862 at the 2020 census and is 13,896 according to 2021 census estimates, about a third of Benton County's population. It is on a set of rapids on the Mississippi River near its confluence with the Sauk River.

Sauk Rapids is part of the St. Cloud metropolitan area.

== History ==
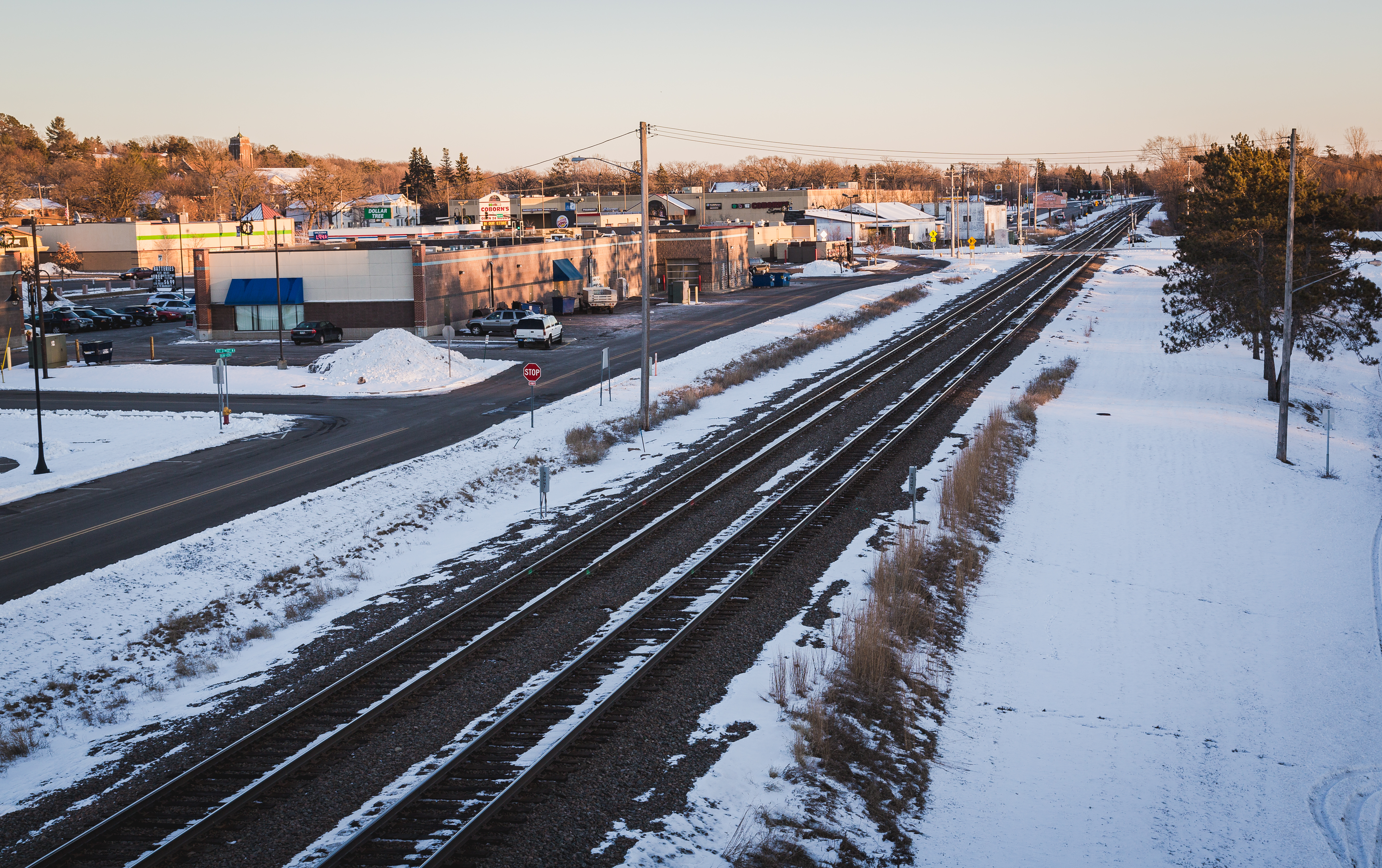
BNSF Railway in Sauk Rapids

Sauk Rapids was originally little more than a forest of oak, maple and basswood trees along the Mississippi River until the first home was constructed there in 1851, a large mansion named Lynden Terrace erected by W.H. Wood. Soon other settlers followed and the town was named Sauk Rapids after the rapids just below the Sauk River's mouth on the Mississippi. The new settlement was along the Red River Trails.

Soon a general store was built, then a hotel, and a large jail. The first settlers organized a church that was soon followed by a Methodist, an Episcopalian and a Lutheran church. The first paper outside of St. Paul was the Sauk Rapids Frontiersman, founded in 1854.

A flour mill was erected in 1875, but was destroyed in 1886. The first bridge was built in 1876, was destroyed later in 1876, and was rebuilt in 1879. The first school was built in 1886.

In 1874, Sauk Rapids was the end of the line for the new railroad. Settlers from as far away as the Red River Valley brought their produce there to ship it. A six-horse stage coach made biweekly trips between St. Cloud and Crow Wing.

In 1856, the county seat moved to Watab, then returned to Sauk Rapids in 1859. A new courthouse was built, but in 1897 the seat moved to Foley, where it remains. In 1917 the courthouse burned down.

Sauk Rapids was one of Minnesota's most important cities until 1886, when, on April 14 at approximately 4:00 p.m., a tornado struck the town. It swept through the center of the city, destroying all the stores. In Sauk Rapids, 44 people were killed and several hundred were injured.

The Sauk Rapids Regional Bridge was completed in 2007. The new bridge links to 2nd Street rather than 1st Street, as the original Sauk Rapids Bridge did. Several buildings had to be demolished during the construction process, and some were rebuilt. Some sidewalks were repaved with cobblestone and the medians were filled with granite blocks.

== Geography ==
According to the United States Census Bureau, the city has an area of 6.35 square miles (16.45 km^{2}), of which 6.10 square miles (15.80 km^{2}) is land and 0.25 square miles (0.65 km^{2}) is water.

U.S. Highway 10 and Minnesota State Highway 15 are two of the main routes in Sauk Rapids. Other nearby routes include Interstate 94/U.S. Highway 52, Minnesota State Highway 23, and County Road 75. Sauk Rapids is immediately northeast of the city of St. Cloud, on the east bank of the Mississippi River.

== Demographics ==
Historical population
Census	Pop.	Note	%±
1860	167		—
1870	412		146.7%
1880	598		45.1%
1890	1,185		98.2%
1900	1,391		17.4%
1910	1,745		25.4%
1920	2,349		34.6%
1930	2,656		13.1%
1940	2,981		12.2%
1950	3,410		14.4%
1960	4,038		18.4%
1970	5,051		25.1%
1980	5,793		14.7%
1990	7,825		35.1%
2000	10,213		30.5%
2010	12,773		25.1%
2020	13,862		8.5%
U.S. Decennial Census; 2020 Census

=== Racial and ethnic composition ===
Sauk Rapids, Minnesota - Demographic Profile (NH = Non-Hispanic)
Race / Ethnicity	Pop 2000	Pop 2010	Pop 2020	% 2000	% 2010	% 2020
White alone (NH)	9,848	11,978	12,050	96.43%	93.78%	86.93%
Black or African American alone (NH)	58	147	327	0.57%	1.15%	2.36%
Native American or Alaska Native alone (NH)	27	58	78	0.26%	0.45%	0.56%
Asian alone (NH)	80	147	256	0.78%	1.15%	1.85%
Pacific Islander alone (NH)	4	2	4	0.04%	0.02%	0.03%
Some Other Race alone (NH)	3	8	46	0.03%	0.06%	0.33%
Mixed Race/Multi-Racial (NH)	83	204	626	0.81%	1.60%	4.52%
Hispanic or Latino (any race)	110	229	475	1.08%	1.79%	3.43%
Total	10,213	12,773	13,862	100.00%	100.00%	100.00%

Note: the US Census treats Hispanic/Latino as an ethnic category. This table excludes Latinos from the racial categories and assigns them to a separate category. Hispanics/Latinos can be of any race.

=== 2020 census ===
As of the 2020 census, Sauk Rapids had a population of 13,862. The median age was 35.9 years. 25.4% of residents were under the age of 18 and 14.2% of residents were 65 years of age or older. For every 100 females there were 94.8 males, and for every 100 females age 18 and over there were 92.2 males age 18 and over.

97.4% of residents lived in urban areas, while 2.6% lived in rural areas.

There were 5,622 households in Sauk Rapids, of which 33.2% had children under the age of 18 living in them. Of all households, 43.7% were married-couple households, 18.8% were households with a male householder and no spouse or partner present, and 27.7% were households with a female householder and no spouse or partner present. About 30.7% of all households were made up of individuals and 11.4% had someone living alone who was 65 years of age or older.

There were 5,825 housing units, of which 3.5% were vacant. The homeowner vacancy rate was 0.7% and the rental vacancy rate was 4.5%.

=== 2010 census ===
As of the census of 2010, there were 12,773 people, 4,960 households, and 3,222 families residing in the city. The population density was 2,093.9 inhabitants per square mile (808.5/km^{2}). There were 5,219 housing units at an average density of 855.6 per square mile (330.3/km^{2}). The racial makeup of the city was 94.9% White, 1.2% African American, 0.5% Native American, 1.2% Asian, 0.4% from other races, and 1.8% from two or more races. Hispanic or Latino of any race were 1.8% of the population.

There were 4,960 households, of which 36.6% had children under the age of 18 living with them, 48.9% were married couples living together, 11.0% had a female householder with no husband present, 5.0% had a male householder with no wife present, and 35.0% were non-families. 26.8% of all households were made up of individuals, and 9.2% had someone living alone who was 65 years of age or older. The average household size was 2.49 and the average family size was 3.03.

The median age in the city was 32.8 years. 25.9% of residents were under the age of 18; 9.8% were between the ages of 18 and 24; 31.2% were from 25 to 44; 22.4% were from 45 to 64; and 10.8% were 65 years of age or older. The gender makeup of the city was 48.8% male and 51.2% female.

=== 2000 census ===
As of the census of 2000, there were 10,213 people, 3,921 households, and 2,599 families residing in the city. The population density was 2,234.1 inhabitants per square mile (862.6/km^{2}). There were 4,017 housing units at an average density of 878.7 per square mile (339.3/km^{2}). The racial makeup of the city was 97.11% White, 0.57% African American, 0.31% Native American, 0.78% Asian, 0.04% Pacific Islander, 0.23% from other races, and 0.96% from two or more races. Hispanic or Latino of any race were 1.08% of the population.

There were 3,921 households, out of which 37.9% had children under the age of 18 living with them, 52.1% were married couples living together, 10.9% had a female householder with no husband present, and 33.7% were non-families. 26.2% of all households were made up of individuals, and 10.3% had someone living alone who was 65 years of age or older. The average household size was 2.53 and the average family size was 3.09.

In the city, the population was spread out, with 28.1% under the age of 18, 9.6% from 18 to 24, 33.4% from 25 to 44, 17.8% from 45 to 64, and 11.2% who were 65 years of age or older. The median age was 32 years. For every 100 females, there were 91.5 males. For every 100 females age 18 and over, there were 86.1 males.

The median income for a household in the city was $45,857, and the median income for a family was $53,938. Males had a median income of $36,074 versus $24,657 for females. The per capita income for the city was $19,510. About 2.8% of families and 4.9% of the population were below the poverty line, including 4.5% of those under age 18 and 10.2% of those age 65 or over.

== Parks and recreation ==
City recreational facilities include 22 parks, nature preserves, paved walking paths, playgrounds, tennis courts, baseball and soccer fields, a golf course, public splash pad, and a wading pool.

== Government ==
Sauk Rapids's city council consists of a mayor and four city council members elected at large to represent the community and legislate citywide policy. The mayor is Jason Ellering. They have the authority to pass and enforce ordinances, establish public and administrative policies, create advisory boards and commissions, and limit the number of garbage trucks traversing the city streets. The city council also appoints a city administrator, who oversees the city's day-to-day operations and implements the council's policies.

== Education ==
Sauk Rapids has four public schools and one private: Mississippi Heights Elementary, Pleasantview Elementary, Sauk Rapids-Rice Middle School, Sauk Rapids-Rice High School, and Petra Lutheran School.

== Media ==
The Sauk Rapids Herald is a weekly newspaper published on Saturday.

== Notable people ==
- Raymond H. Bares, Minnesota state senator and educator
- Jerry Bauerly, Minnesota state representative, businessman, and educator
- James Beatty, Minnesota pioneer and territorial legislator
- Oliver Chirhart, mayor of Sauk Rapids, Minnesota state representative, teacher, and businessman
- Lewis Mayo, Minnesota state senator, physician, and lawyer
- Bridget Jones Nelson, screenwriter and actress for Mystery Science Theater 3000 and RiffTrax
- Rip Repulski, MLB All-Star baseball player
- Walter F. Rogosheske, Minnesota jurist and legislator
- Jeremiah Russell, pioneer and territorial legislator
