= Foley, Minnesota =

City in Minnesota, United States

Foley
- City
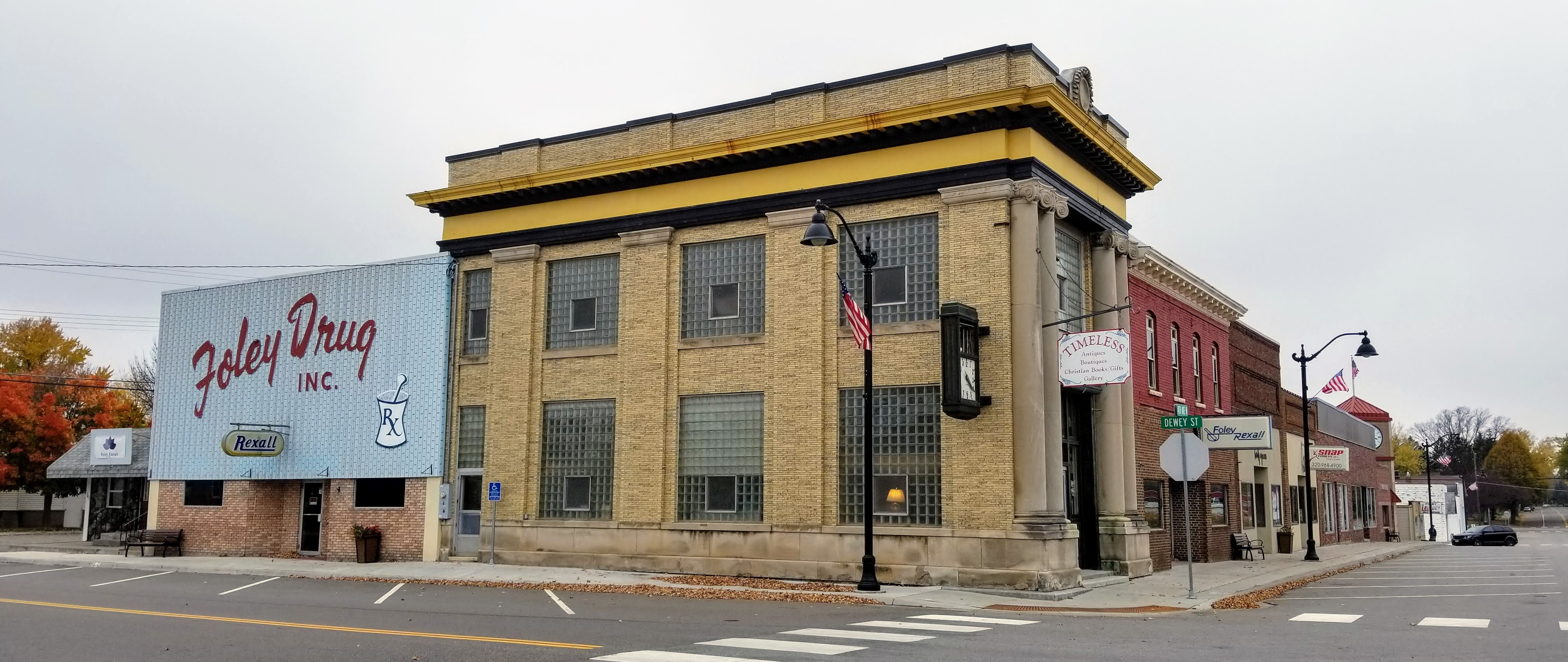
- Buildings in Foley (2020)

- Location of Foley within Benton County and state of Minnesota
- Coordinates: 45°39′49″N 93°54′34″W
- Country: United States
- State: Minnesota
- County: Benton
- Founded: 1890

Government
  - Mayor: Brandon Voit

Area
  - Total: 2.55 sq mi (6.61 km^{2})
  - Land: 2.55 sq mi (6.61 km^{2})
  - Water: 0 sq mi (0.00 km^{2})
- Elevation: 1,138 ft (347 m)

Population (2020)
  - Total: 2,711
  - Estimate (2022): 2,682
  - Density: 1,061.8/sq mi (409.96/km^{2})
- Time zone: UTC−6 (Central (CST))
  - Summer (DST): UTC−5 (CDT)
- ZIP Codes: 56329, 56357
- Area code: 320
- FIPS code: 27-21536
- GNIS feature ID: 2394779
- Sales tax: 7.375%
- Website: ci.foley.mn.us

Foley (/ˈfoʊli/ FOH-lee) is a city and the county seat of Benton County, Minnesota, United States. The population was 2,711 at the 2020 census.

Foley is part of the St. Cloud metropolitan area.

== History ==
Foley was named for its founder, John Foley.

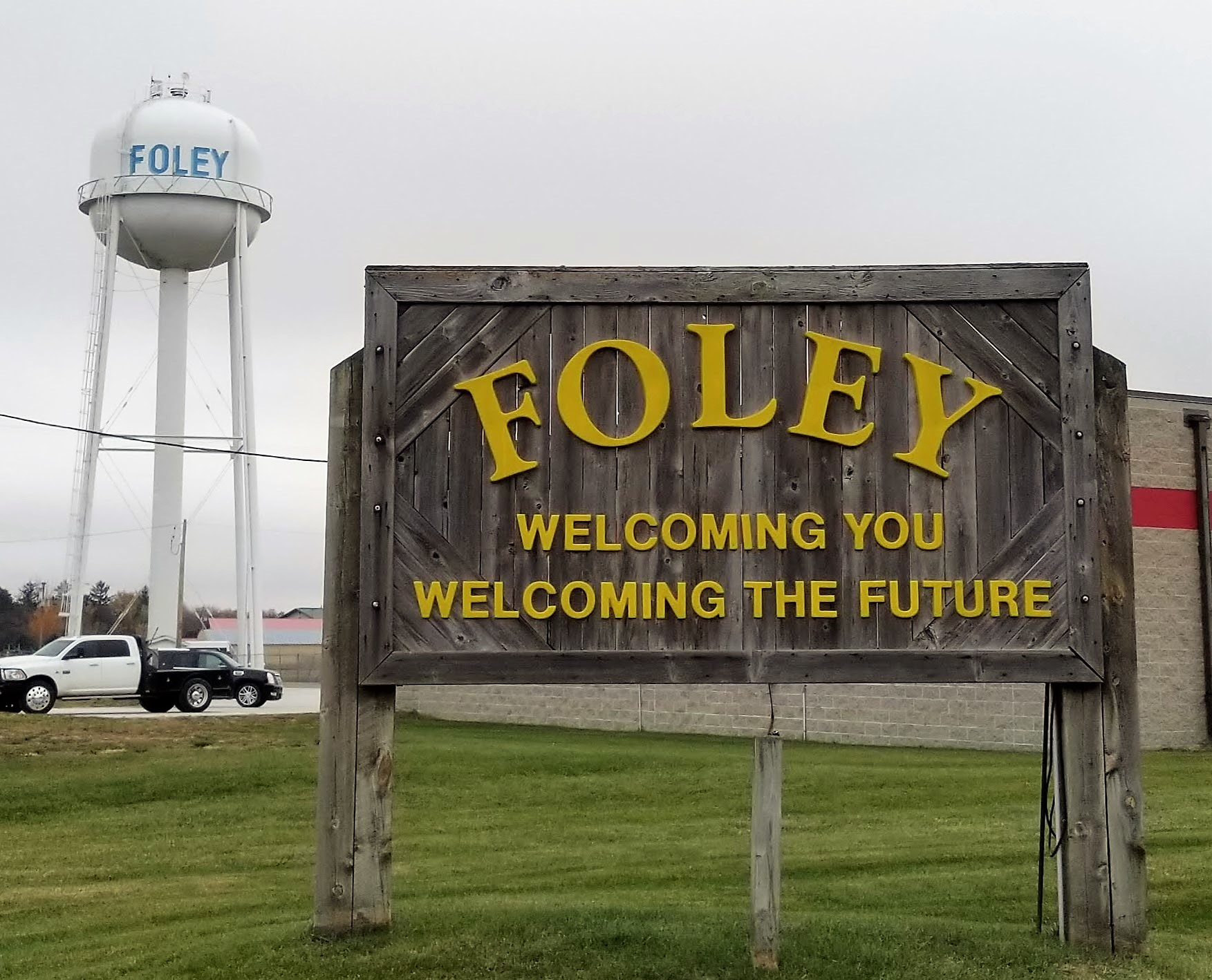
Sign welcoming visitors to Foley

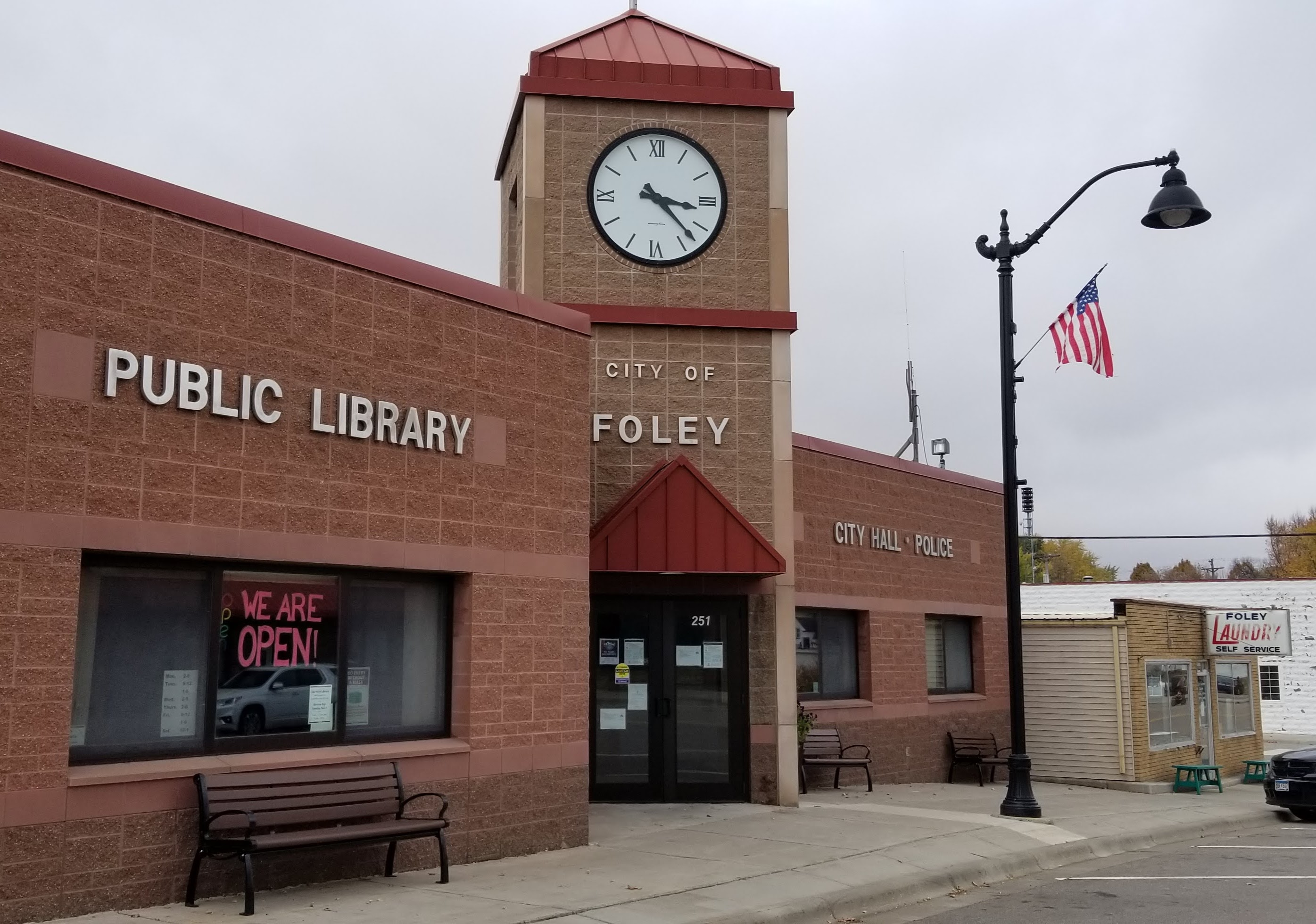
Foley city hall and public library (2020)

== Geography ==
According to the United States Census Bureau, the city has an area of 2.51 square miles (6.50 km^{2}), all land.

Minnesota State Highways 23 and 25 are two of the main routes in the city.

== Demographics ==
Historical population
Census	Pop.	Note	%±
1900	172		—
1910	710		312.8%
1920	837		17.9%
1930	798		−4.7%
1940	961		20.4%
1950	1,089		13.3%
1960	1,112		2.1%
1970	1,271		14.3%
1980	1,606		26.4%
1990	1,854		15.4%
2000	2,154		16.2%
2010	2,603		20.8%
2020	2,711		4.1%
2022 (est.)	2,682		−1.1%
U.S. Decennial Census; 2020 Census

=== 2020 census ===
As of the 2020 census, Foley had a population of 2,711. The median age was 34.0 years. 29.7% of residents were under the age of 18 and 13.7% of residents were 65 years of age or older. For every 100 females there were 98.9 males, and for every 100 females age 18 and over there were 93.8 males age 18 and over.

0.0% of residents lived in urban areas, while 100.0% lived in rural areas.

There were 1,011 households in Foley, of which 37.8% had children under the age of 18 living in them. Of all households, 45.4% were married-couple households, 16.8% were households with a male householder and no spouse or partner present, and 28.7% were households with a female householder and no spouse or partner present. About 28.3% of all households were made up of individuals and 12.8% had someone living alone who was 65 years of age or older.

There were 1,060 housing units, of which 4.6% were vacant. The homeowner vacancy rate was 0.6% and the rental vacancy rate was 4.7%.

Racial composition as of the 2020 census
Race	Number	Percent
White	2,563	94.5%
Black or African American	15	0.6%
American Indian and Alaska Native	11	0.4%
Asian	6	0.2%
Native Hawaiian and Other Pacific Islander	0	0.0%
Some other race	17	0.6%
Two or more races	99	3.7%
Hispanic or Latino (of any race)	45	1.7%

=== 2010 census ===
As of the census of 2010, there were 2,603 people, 964 households, and 631 families living in the city. The population density was 1,037.1 inhabitants per square mile (400.4/km^{2}). There were 1,038 housing units at an average density of 413.5 per square mile (159.7/km^{2}). The racial makeup of the city was 97.7% White, 0.8% African American, 0.3% Native American, 0.1% Asian, 0.2% from other races, and 1.0% from two or more races. Hispanic or Latino of any race were 0.8% of the population.

There were 964 households, of which 39.6% had children under the age of 18 living with them, 47.2% were married couples living together, 12.1% had a female householder with no husband present, 6.1% had a male householder with no wife present, and 34.5% were non-families. 27.7% of all households were made up of individuals, and 15.4% had someone living alone who was 65 years of age or older. The average household size was 2.55 and the average family size was 3.13.

The median age in the city was 31.6 years. 29% of residents were under the age of 18; 8.3% were between the ages of 18 and 24; 29.9% were from 25 to 44; 18.4% were from 45 to 64; and 14.4% were 65 years of age or older. The gender makeup of the city was 49.1% male and 50.9% female.

=== 2000 census ===
As of the census of 2000, there were 2,154 people, 756 households, and 499 families living in the city. The population density was 1,148.6 inhabitants per square mile (443.5/km^{2}). There were 793 housing units at an average density of 422.8 per square mile (163.2/km^{2}). The racial makeup of the city was 97.21% White, 1.35% African American, 0.37% Native American, 0.46% Asian, 0.09% from other races, and 0.51% from two or more races. Hispanic or Latino of any race were 0.46% of the population.

There were 756 households, out of which 39.2% had children under the age of 18 living with them, 50.5% were married couples living together, 11.5% had a female householder with no husband present, and 33.9% were non-families. 30.0% of all households were made up of individuals, and 16.1% had someone living alone who was 65 years of age or older. The average household size was 2.60 and the average family size was 3.23.

In the city, the population was spread out, with 27.6% under the age of 18, 11.7% from 18 to 24, 27.6% from 25 to 44, 15.2% from 45 to 64, and 17.8% who were 65 years of age or older. The median age was 33 years. For every 100 females, there were 99.8 males. For every 100 females age 18 and over, there were 93.2 males.

The median income for a household in the city was $38,393, and the median income for a family was $48,750. Males had a median income of $32,466 versus $21,731 for females. The per capita income for the city was $17,168. About 6.1% of families and 9.4% of the population were below the poverty line, including 8.8% of those under age 18 and 20.7% of those age 65 or over.

== Media ==
The Benton County News is a weekly newspaper headquartered in Foley. It is published on Tuesdays and is owned by Star Publications.
