= Tornadoes of 1955 =

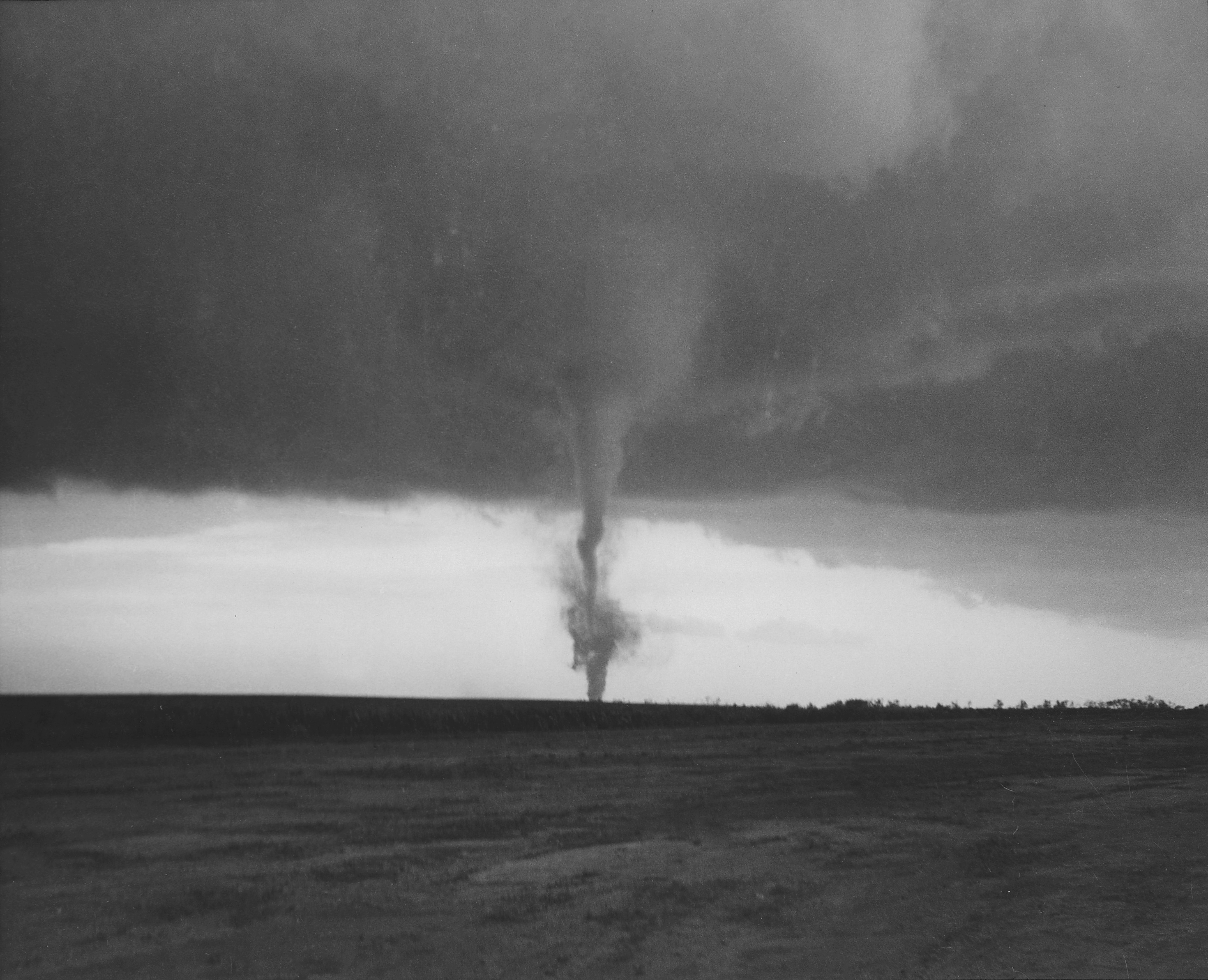
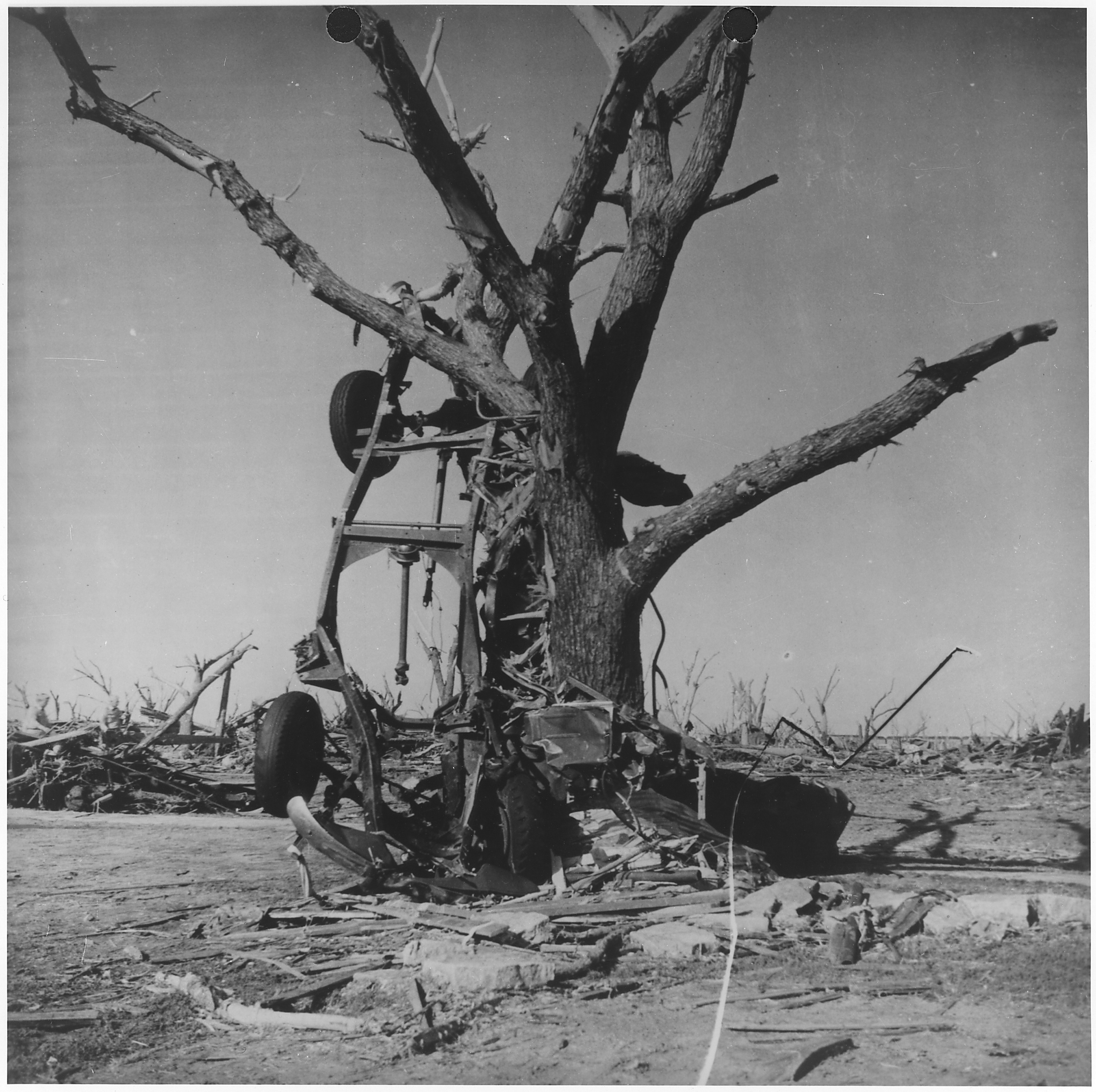
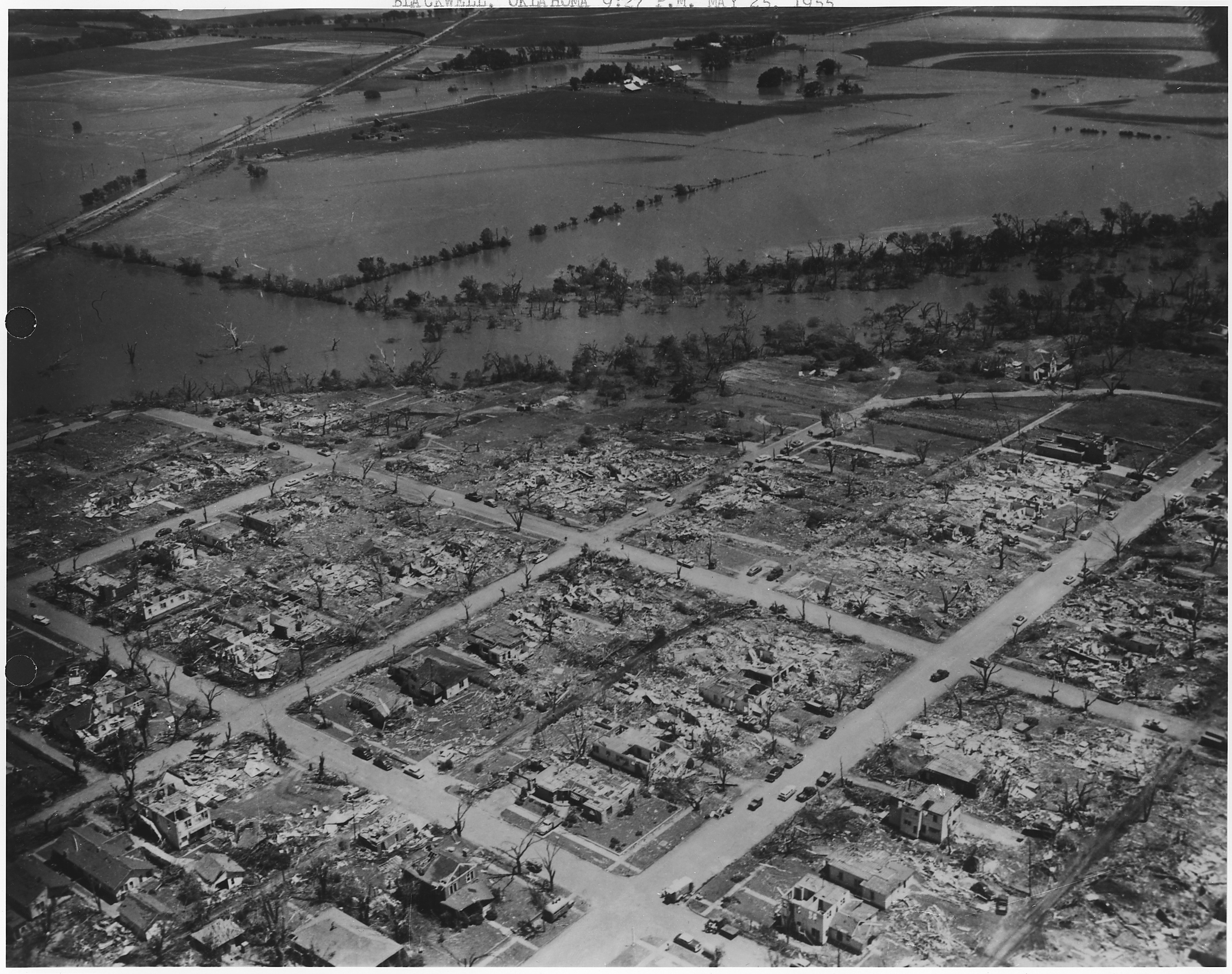
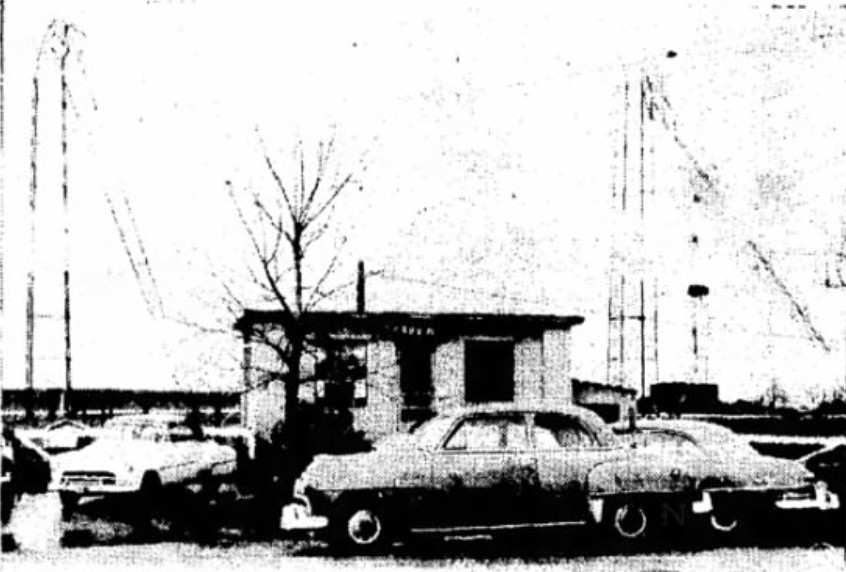
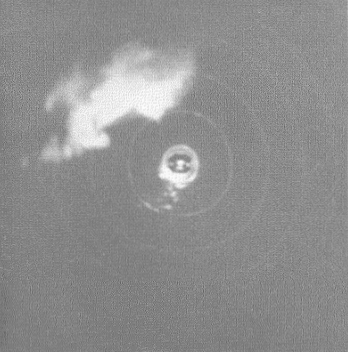
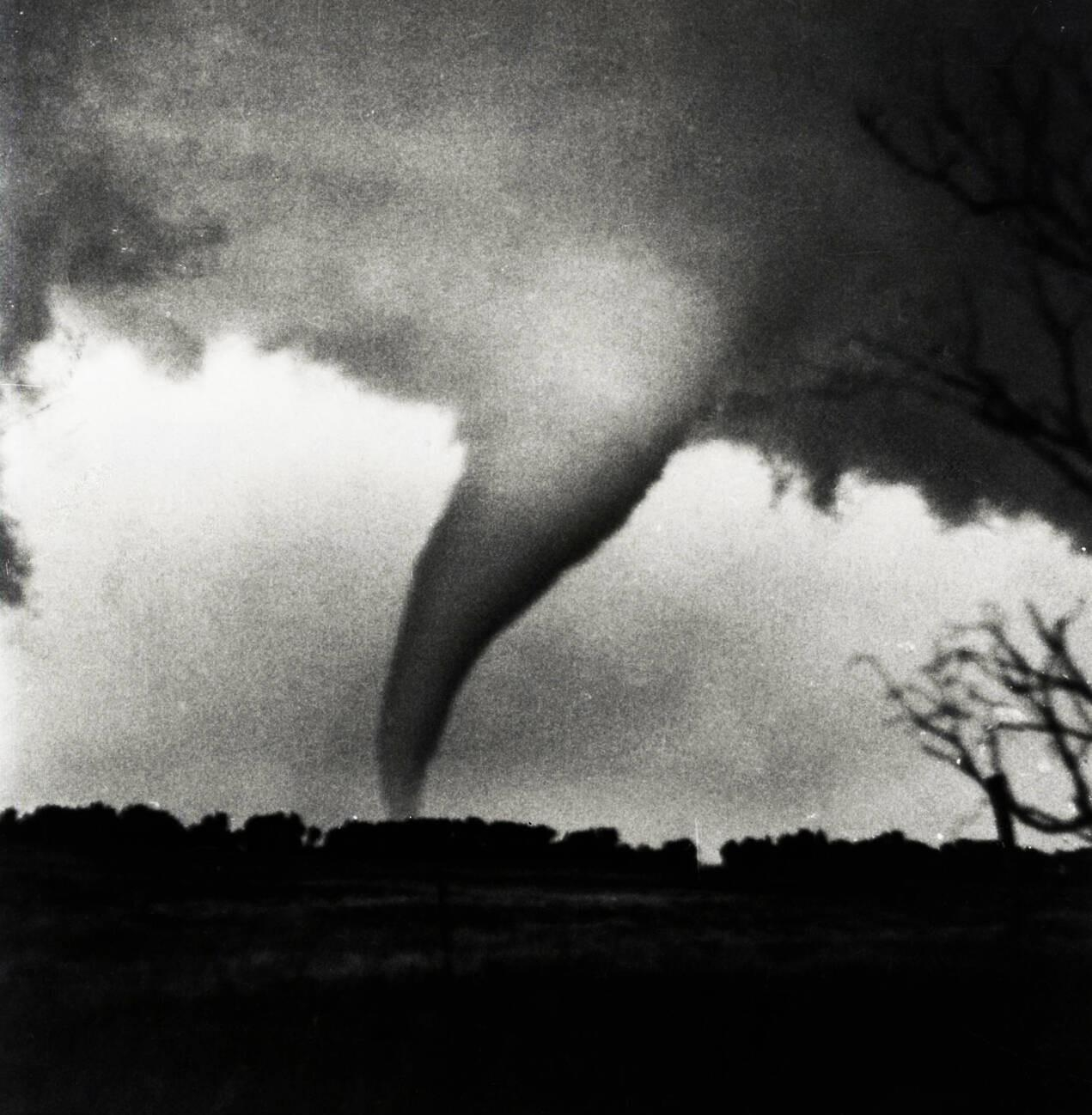
- Clockwise from top: A thin F4 tornado near Scottsbluff, Nebraska on June 27; An aerial view of Blackwell, Oklahoma after an F5 tornado on May 25; A radar image showing a hook echo near Scottsbluff, Nebraska on June 27; A large F3 tornado south of Raymond, Kansas on June 4; Damage to two radio towers in Sherman, Texas after an F3 tornado on April 6; A mangled car wrapped around a tree in Udall, Kansas after an F5 tornado on May 26.
- Timespan: 1955
- Maximum rated tornado: F5 tornado: Blackwell, Oklahoma on May 25; Udall, Kansas on May 25
- Tornadoes in U.S.: 591
- Damage (U.S.): $82.66 million (1955 USD)
- Fatalities (U.S.): 129*
- Fatalities (worldwide): >129

This page documents the tornadoes and tornado outbreaks of 1955, primarily in the United States. Most tornadoes form in the U.S., although some events may take place internationally. Tornado statistics for older years like this often appear significantly lower than modern years due to fewer reports or confirmed tornadoes.

The total count of tornadoes and ratings differs from various agencies accordingly. The article, therefore, documents information from the most contemporary official sources alongside assessments from tornado historian Thomas P. Grazulis.

== Events ==
Fatal United States tornadoes in 1955
- Approximate touchdown location of killer tornadoes in 1955 Summary of tornadoes: March 1 – Ohio (1 death); March 13 – South Carolina (2 deaths); March 16 – North Carolina (1 death); March 22 – Pennsylvania (1 death); April 6 – Texas (1 death); April 21 – Arkansas (1 death); April 24 – Alabama (5 deaths); May 6 – Texas (1 death); May 24 – Georgia (3 deaths); May 25 – Texas, Oklahoma (2 deaths); May 25 – Oklahoma, Kansas (20 deaths); May 25 – Oklahoma, Kansas (80 deaths); June 27 – Nebraska (2 deaths); July 2 – North Dakota (2 deaths); July 7 – Minnesota (1 death); July 8 – Nebraska (1 death); July 15 – Oklahoma (1 death); September 16 – Minnesota (1 death); September 22 – Kansas (1 death); October 28 – Georgia (1 death); November 15 – Arkansas (1 death); Total fatalities: 129

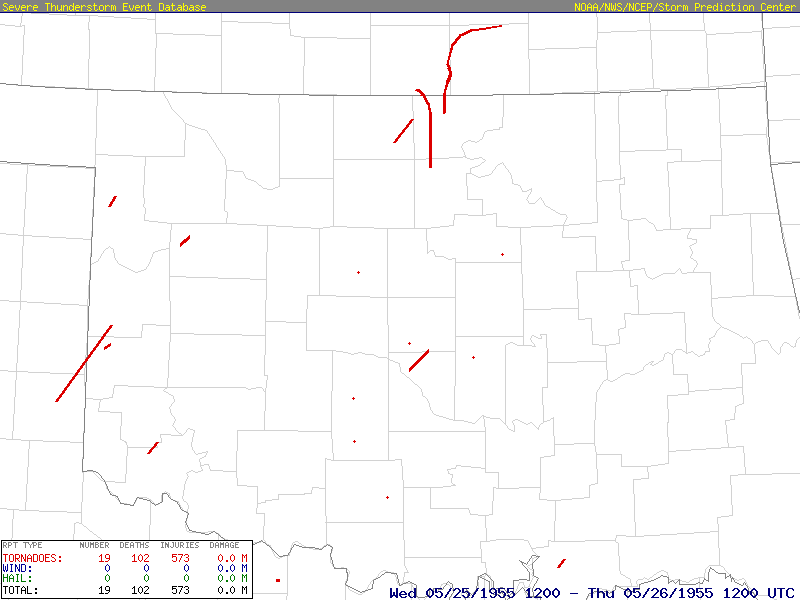
Oklahoma tornado tracks during the 1955 Great Plains tornado outbreak.

Several unusual events occurred during the 1955 tornado season. May 25 saw two F5 tornadoes on the ground at the same time in the same general area of Northern Oklahoma and Southern Kansas, both of which caused catastrophic damage and hundreds of casualties. In addition, 1955 saw five people killed by F0 tornadoes, with four of them being in Georgia alone. This was the most deaths from F0/EF0 tornadoes in a single year at the time.

=== United States yearly total ===
Confirmed tornadoes by Fujita rating
FU	F0	F1	F2	F3	F4	F5	Total
0	170	217	164	30	8	2	591

== January ==
There were 3 tornadoes confirmed in the US in January.

=== January 18 ===
A rare F1 tornado moved through areas just west of Downtown Los Angeles. There were no casualties.

== February ==
There were 4 tornadoes confirmed in the US in February.

=== February 1 ===
FU	F0	F1	F2	F3	F4	F5
0	0	1	2*	1*	0	0

Two tornadoes were officially confirmed in Tennessee with one rated F2, in Bell Buckle and another rated F1 in Altamont. However, according to Grazulis, at least two other significant tornadoes occurred in Mississippi. The first, rated F3, struck Commerce Landing and Clark, killing 23 people, most of them at a plantation school. It destroyed 45 tenant homes and damaged about 50 others. The second tornado, rated F2, destroyed another plantation school between Olive Branch and Lewisburg, killing two students and a teacher. It is likely that other tornadoes occurred on that day in northern Alabama, with significant damage in Huntsville. Official surveys concluded that these events were not tornadoes because debris was only thrown in one direction, despite funnels being sighted and large objects being thrown long distances. Grazulis also assessed the event in Bell Buckle, Tennessee as likely being a downburst rather than a tornado.

== March ==
There were 42 tornadoes confirmed in the US in March.

=== March 1 ===
FU	F0	F1	F2	F3	F4	F5
0	0	1	1	1	0	0

Three damaging tornadoes struck Ohio and Indiana. The first one was a(n) F1 tornado that struck the southwest side of Troy, Ohio, injuring one. A destructive F2 struck just south of Bedford, Indiana. The final tornado was a strong F3 tornado in Tyrrell, Ohio that killed one and injured six. Overall, the three tornadoes killed one and injured seven.

=== March 13–16 ===
FU	F0	F1	F2	F3	F4	F5
0	0	1	4	1	0	0

A destructive series of tornadoes struck South Carolina, Missouri, Kentucky, and North Carolina. On March 13, an isolated, but strong F2 tornado moved through the north sides of Ridge Spring and Monetta, South Carolina, killing 2 and injuring 10. The next day, a(n) F3 tornado moved through rural areas of Clinton and Caldwell Counties in Missouri, injuring one. On March 15, a brief, but strong F2 tornado hit the southeast side of Cleaton, Kentucky, injuring nine. Finally, on March 16, another isolated, but large F2 tornado tore through areas southeast of Black Creek, North Carolina, killing one and injuring another. Overall, the six tornadoes killed three and injured 21.

=== March 19 ===
A rare F0 tornado briefly touched down near Wainaku, Hawaii north of Hilo. There were no casualties.

=== March 20–22 ===
FU	F0	F1	F2	F3	F4	F5
0	0	8	7	2	0	0

An unusually intense outbreak of 17 tornadoes impacted areas from Texas to Vermont. On March 20, the first tornado of the outbreak struck Illinois Bend, Texas just south of the Red River, injuring one. Later, a long-tracked F2 tornado hit the southeastern part of Jonesboro, Arkansas, before moving into Missouri and striking the towns of Arbyrd, Hollywood, Caruth, and Pascola. The tornado then lifted just before reaching the Mississippi River after injuring one along its 89.4 mile path. An F1 tornado then moved directly through Killeen, Texas, injuring one. This was followed by a strong F3 tornado that injured 17 east of East Prairie, Missouri.

The next day, an F2 tornado northeast of Allsboro, Alabama injured one. March 22 then produced destructive and deadly tornado activity. An F1 tornado struck Willow Crest and Southern Poland, Ohio south of Youngstown, injuring three. Later, the one fatal tornado of the outbreak touched down and struck West Chester, Caswallen, West Goshen, Malvern, and Paoli, Pennsylvania at F3 strength, killing one. The final tornado was a brief, but unusually strong F2 tornado in Shaftsbury, Vermont, although there were no casualties. In the end, the outbreak killed one and injured 26.

== April ==
There were 99 tornadoes confirmed in the US in April.

=== April 5–6 ===
FU	F0	F1	F2	F3	F4	F5
0	1	2	5	3	0	0

Nine destructive tornadoes touched down in Texas. On April 5, a long-tracked F2 tornado moved through Stamford before tracking 43.7 miles through rural areas into the northwest side of Woodson, injuring six. The next day, another long-tracked F3 tornado hit Sherman, Bells, Savoy, Ector, Bonham, and Dodd City, killing one and injuring 27. This was followed by another F3 tornado that hit Antelope, Shannon, and the western side of Newport, although there were no casualties. A third F3 tornado moved through the south side of Gainesville before hitting Woodbine without any casualties. This was followed by yet another long-tracked F2 tornado that hit Sanger, Lake Ray Roberts, Pilot Point, and the north side of Van Alstyne, injuring one. Overall, the Texas tornadoes killed one and injured 36. Two additional weak tornadoes later touched down and struck South Carolina, and even California as well.

=== April 11–14 ===
FU	F0	F1	F2	F3	F4	F5
0	6	3	4	1	0	0

A tornado outbreak affected the Great Plains and the Southeast. The only tornado to cause casualties was an F3 storm that moved directly through Frankston, Texas into Blackburn Bay on April 12, injuring seven. The same day, a long-tracked F2 tornado moved east-northeast through the south side of Mendenhall, Mississippi before striking Sylvarena and Mulberry along its 57.6 mile path. An even longer-tracked F2 tornado then touched down in Bethel, Mississippi and moved north, which caused Sylvarena to be hit again. It then hit Buckleytown and Sebastopol before turning northeast and hitting Dixon, Southeastern Philadelphia, and Coy. The tornado then lifted after being on the ground for 112.8 miles. Neither of these tornadoes caused casualties. Overall, 14 tornadoes touched down, injuring seven people.

=== April 21–24 ===
FU	F0	F1	F2	F3	F4	F5
0	2	10	12	2	1	0

A tornado outbreak sequence consisting of four tornado outbreaks over four days impacted the Mississippi Valley and the Great Plains. On April 21, the first tornado of the outbreak struck the eastern side of White Hall, Arkansas at F2 strength, killing one and injuring two. Later on, another F2 tornado hit Selmont-West Selmont south of Selma, Alabama, injuring one. The next day, a strong F3 tornado moved through rural New Madrid County, Missouri, injuring 10. Later, a brief F1 tornado injured two on the east side of Duncan, Oklahoma. On April 23, an F2 tornado hit Isadora, Missouri, injuring one. Later, a large F3 tornado moved through rural Ringgold County, Iowa with no casualties.

Tornado activity abruptly ramped up overnight into the morning on April 24. An F2 tornado struck Graball and Rock Bridge, Tennessee, although there were no casualties. This was not the case in Alabama, where the worst tornado of the outbreak occurred. A violent F4 tornado tore through rural areas of Morgan County before moving directly through Falkville. Five people were killed and 20 were injured. That afternoon, the final tornado of the outbreak than touched down on the east side of Richmond, Kentucky at F1 strength, injuring two. Overall, 27 tornadoes touched down, killing six and injuring 36.

== May ==
147 tornadoes were confirmed in the US in May.

=== May 5–6 ===
FU	F0	F1	F2	F3	F4	F5
0	1	3	4	0	0	0

Eight scattered destructive tornadoes impacted North Carolina, Texas, Iowa, and Kansas. On May 5, a brief but strong F2 tornado hit Pecos, Texas, injuring one. The next day, a fatal F2 tornado moved directly through Temple, Texas, killing one and injuring another. Overall, the seven tornadoes killed one and injured two.

=== May 24 ===
FU	F0	F1	F2	F3	F4	F5
0	1	1	0	0	0	0

Two weak, but damaging and even deadly tornadoes struck Georgia. The first tornado moved directly through Marietta at F1 strength, although there were no casualties. Surprisingly, the F0 tornado then touched down about 2.5 hours later and killed three people southwest of Thomson. As of 2024, this is the deadliest F0 tornado in US history. Overall, the two weak tornadoes caused major damage and three fatalities.

=== May 25–26 ===
FU	F0	F1	F2	F3	F4	F5
0	12	17	12	2	1	2

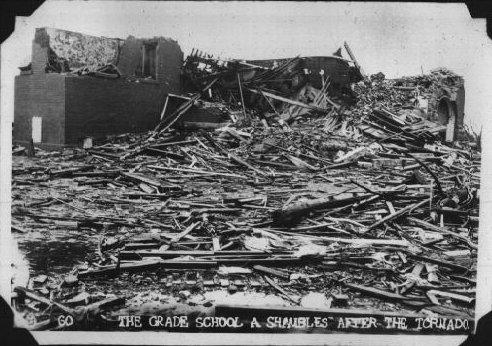
Damage from the Udall Tornado

Towards the end of May, 46 tornadoes touched down in an intense two-day outbreak across the Great Plains and Arkansas. On May 25, a large, long-tracked, 1100-yard wide F4 tornado passed west of Aberdeen, Texas before moving into Oklahoma, turning northeast and striking the north side of Sweetwater, killing two and injuring 18. Later, a large, .25 mile wide F3 tornado hit Deer Creek, Oklahoma, injuring one. Soon afterwards, the most violent tornadoes of the year occurred as two large F5 tornadoes touched down within 34 minutes of each other. The first F5 tornado was 500 yards wide and struck the towns of Blackwell, Oklahoma and South Haven, Kansas, killing 20 and injuring 280 on its 28.4 mile path. After that, an even larger, longer-tracked, and deadlier F5 tornado touched down near Peckham, Oklahoma and moved into Kansas. It grew to 1320 yards wide and hit the towns of Ashton, Oxford, Udall, Rock, and Atlanta, killing 80 and injuring 273 along its 56.4 mile path. The 100 deaths accounted for about 77.5% of the fatalities in 1955.

The next day, featured weaker but more numerous tornado activity (30 tornadoes compared to 16 the day before), with the two worst tornadoes occurring in Arkansas. A large, 1000 yard F3 tornado hit Jessieville, and Paron, injuring three. Later, an F2 tornado hit Weldon, injuring seven. In the end, the violent outbreak killed 102 and injured 593.

== June ==
There were 153 tornadoes confirmed in the US in June.

=== June 4–5 ===
FU	F0	F1	F2	F3	F4	F5
0	23	15	4	2	2	0

A tornado outbreak occurred across the Great Plains and Michigan, with most of tornadoes impacting Kansas. On June 4, a large, long-tracked 500 yard wide F4 tornado struck Formoso, Kansas before moving into Nebraska and hitting areas west of Hubell along its 61.9 mile path. Later, an even longer-tracked F4 tornado hit Kinsley, Kansas along a 72.2 mile path. In rural Stafford County, Kansas, an F3 tornado impacted areas east of Hudson. Another F3 tornado moved through rural Rice County in between Raymond and Alden. The next day, a mile-wide F1 tornado struck the north side of Florence, Texas. An F2 tornado then hit the south side of Encinal, Texas. Later, the final F2 tornado briefly touched down right in the center of Weimar, Texas. In all, 46 tornadoes touched down, although, incredibly, despite several tornadoes being intense and long-tracked, there were no casualties.

=== June 26–27 ===
FU	F0	F1	F2	F3	F4	F5
0	5	1	1	2	1	0

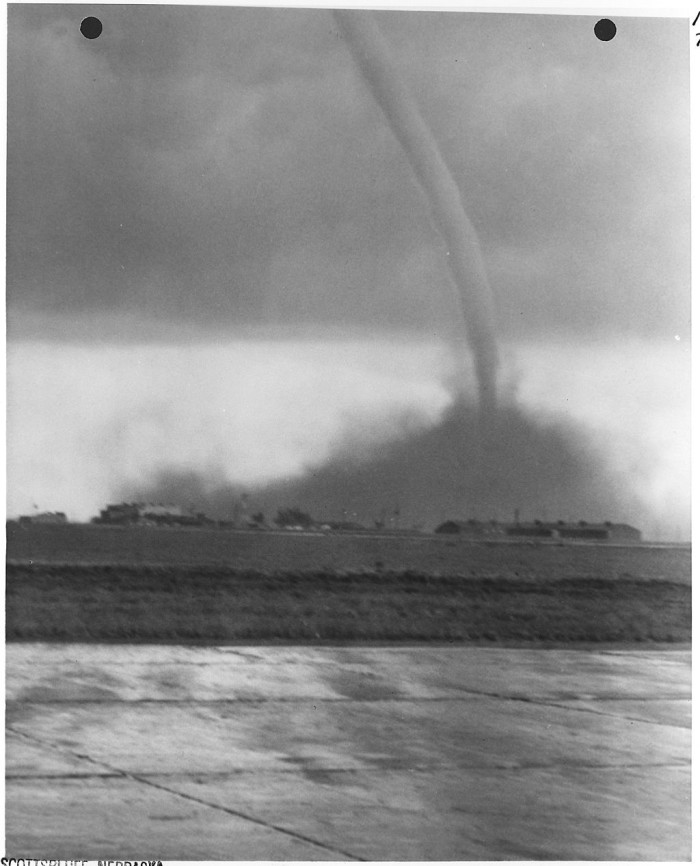
The F4 Scottsbluff, Nebraska tornado passing the Scottsbluff airport.

Ten scattered tornadoes touched down across the High Plains and Louisiana with the greatest concentration near the Wyoming/Nebraska state line. An F3 tornado on the evening of June 26 destroyed all buildings except for the house on one farm southwest of Torrington, Wyoming, killing three horses. An F2 tornado also touched northeast of Hartville, Wyoming. On June 27, another F3 tornado destroyed a farm near Bordeaux, Wyoming, injuring three people. The most significant event of this outbreak was a violent F4 tornado that hit the southeast side of Mitchell, Nebraska before moving through the north sides of Scottsbluff, Minatare, and Bayard, killing two people and injuring 29. The most significant damage was in the Scottsbluff area, where 28 homes were destroyed and the two fatalities occurred. The tornado left cycloidal marks on the ground, which were later understood to indicate a multiple-vortex structure, but this phenomenon was not understood at the time. This event as a whole killed two people and injured 32.

== July ==
There were 49 tornadoes confirmed in the US in July.

=== July 1–10 ===
FU	F0	F1	F2	F3	F4	F5
0	4	12	7	2	3	0

The first ten days of July produced 28 scattered tornadoes that caused varying degrees of damage and casualties across the Northern US. On July 2, an F4 tornado struck rural Richland County, North Dakota north of Colfax, completely leveling or sweeping away 11 farms, including one farm that appeared to show potential F5 damage to a home that was swept completely away. Two people were killed and 19 others were injured. That was followed by a 440 yard wide F3 tornado that moved south-southeastward through rural Wilkin County, Minnesota, just east of the Minnesota-North Dakota state line. Two people were injured. July 5 saw a brief, but strong F2 tornado in rural Franklin County, Massachusetts north of Amherst, although there were no casualties. That was followed by another F4 tornado that tracked 28 miles through rural Mountrail County, North Dakota with no casualties.

On July 7, an F1 tornado injured one northeast of Arco, Minnesota. At the same time, a long-tracked violent F4 tornado moved through Lyon County, Minnesota, killing one and injuring 13. Early on July 8, another long-tracked F2 tornado struck Loup City and Elba, Nebraska, also killing one and injuring 13. The final tornado during the period occurred on July 10, when an F2 tornado struck Eaton and Ault, Colorado without causing any casualties. In the end, the outbreak sequence caused four fatalities and 48 injuries.

=== July 15 ===
FU	F0	F1	F2	F3	F4	F5
0	0	2	0	0	0	0

A brief, but destructive F1 tornado touched down in Drayton Plains, Michigan and struck Loon Lake northwest of Pontiac, although there were no casualties. This was not the case in Oklahoma where another F1 tornado tore a 300 yard wide and 1.5 mile long path directly through the center of Sulphur, killing one and injuring two.

== August ==
There were 33 tornadoes confirmed in the US in August.

== September ==
There were 15 tornadoes confirmed in the US in September.

=== September 9 (Denmark) ===
A strong IF2+ tornado struck the town of Kolding, Denmark as it lifted and threw a car 20 meters into a yard.

=== September 16–17 ===
FU	F0	F1	F2	F3	F4	F5
0	0	3	0	0	0	0

An isolated F1 tornado struck the south sides of Bock and Ogilvie, Minnesota, killing one. Two more F1 tornadoes touched down in Minnesota and Nebraska the next day. In the end, the F1 tornadoes killed one.

=== September 22 ===
A brief, isolated, but deadly F0 tornado struck the northwest side of Great Bend, Kansas, killing one. This was the second F0 tornado in 1955 to cause fatalities.

== October ==
There were 23 tornadoes confirmed in the US in October.

=== October 28–29 ===
FU	F0	F1	F2	F3	F4	F5
0	1	0	4	1	0	0

A tornado outbreak produced six brief, but destructive and deadly tornadoes in the Southeast. It started early on October 28, when a family of four brief but strong tornadoes touched down over the course of four hours in Arkansas, Mississippi, and Tennessee. The first tornado was an F2 storm that struck Hampton, Arkansas. An F3 tornado then hit Kelso, Arkansas, injuring one. A destructive F2 tornado moved through Clarksdale and Lyon, Mississippi, also injuring one. The final tornado caused heavy F2 damage in Collierville, Tennessee, an east-southeastern suburb of Memphis. That evening, yet another brief, but surprisingly deadly F0 tornado killed one and injured two southwest Boykin, Georgia, the third F0 tornado in 1955 to cause fatalities in the US and the second to happen in Georgia. The final tornado of the outbreak occurred the next day, when a brief, but strong F2 tornado occurred southeast of Longboat Key, Florida. Overall, the six tornadoes killed one and injured four.

== November ==
There were 20 tornadoes confirmed in the US in November.

=== November 15–16 ===
FU	F0	F1	F2	F3	F4	F5
0	1	7	5	5	0	0

A destructive and deadly outbreak of 18 tornadoes impacted the Mississippi and Ohio Valleys. On November 15, a long-tracked F3 tornado, moved through Heber Springs, Floral, Salado, Magness, and the north side of Newark, Arkansas, killing one and injuring four. Later, a half-mile wide F3 tornado struck areas northeast of Alicia, Arkansas, injuring nine. After that, another F3 tornado hit the east side of Evansville, Indiana, as well as the University of Evansville, also injuring nine. An F2 tornado than injured two in rural Washington County, Arkansas east of Fayetteville. This was followed by yet another F3 tornado that moved out of rural Randolph County, Indiana and struck Greenville, Ohio, injuring eight. Later, a brief, but strong F2 tornado touched down right over Downtown Indianapolis, injuring two.

Early on November 16, a large, 1000 yard wide F2 tornado struck areas south of West Plains, Missouri, injuring two. The final tornado of the outbreak took place just over two hours later, when another F2 tornado moved through areas south of Jonesboro and Anna, Illinois without causing any casualties. Overall, the outbreak killed one and injured 35.

== December ==
There were 3 tornadoes confirmed in the US in December.

== See also ==
- Tornado
  - Tornadoes by year
  - Tornado records
  - Tornado climatology
  - Tornado myths
- List of tornado outbreaks
  - List of F5 and EF5 tornadoes
  - List of North American tornadoes and tornado outbreaks
  - List of 21st-century Canadian tornadoes and tornado outbreaks
  - List of European tornadoes and tornado outbreaks
  - List of tornadoes and tornado outbreaks in Asia
  - List of Southern Hemisphere tornadoes and tornado outbreaks
  - List of tornadoes striking downtown areas
  - List of tornadoes with confirmed satellite tornadoes
- Tornado intensity
  - Fujita scale
  - Enhanced Fujita scale
