= Mahoning Coal Railroad =

Railroad line in Ohio and Pennsylvania, US

Overview
- Headquarters: Cleveland, Ohio, U.S.
- Dates of operation: February 25, 1871–January 7, 1982
- Successor: Lake Shore and Michigan Southern Railway (1884); New York Central Railroad (1914); Penn Central (1968)

Technical
- Track gauge: Standard
- Length: 71.86 miles (115.65 km)

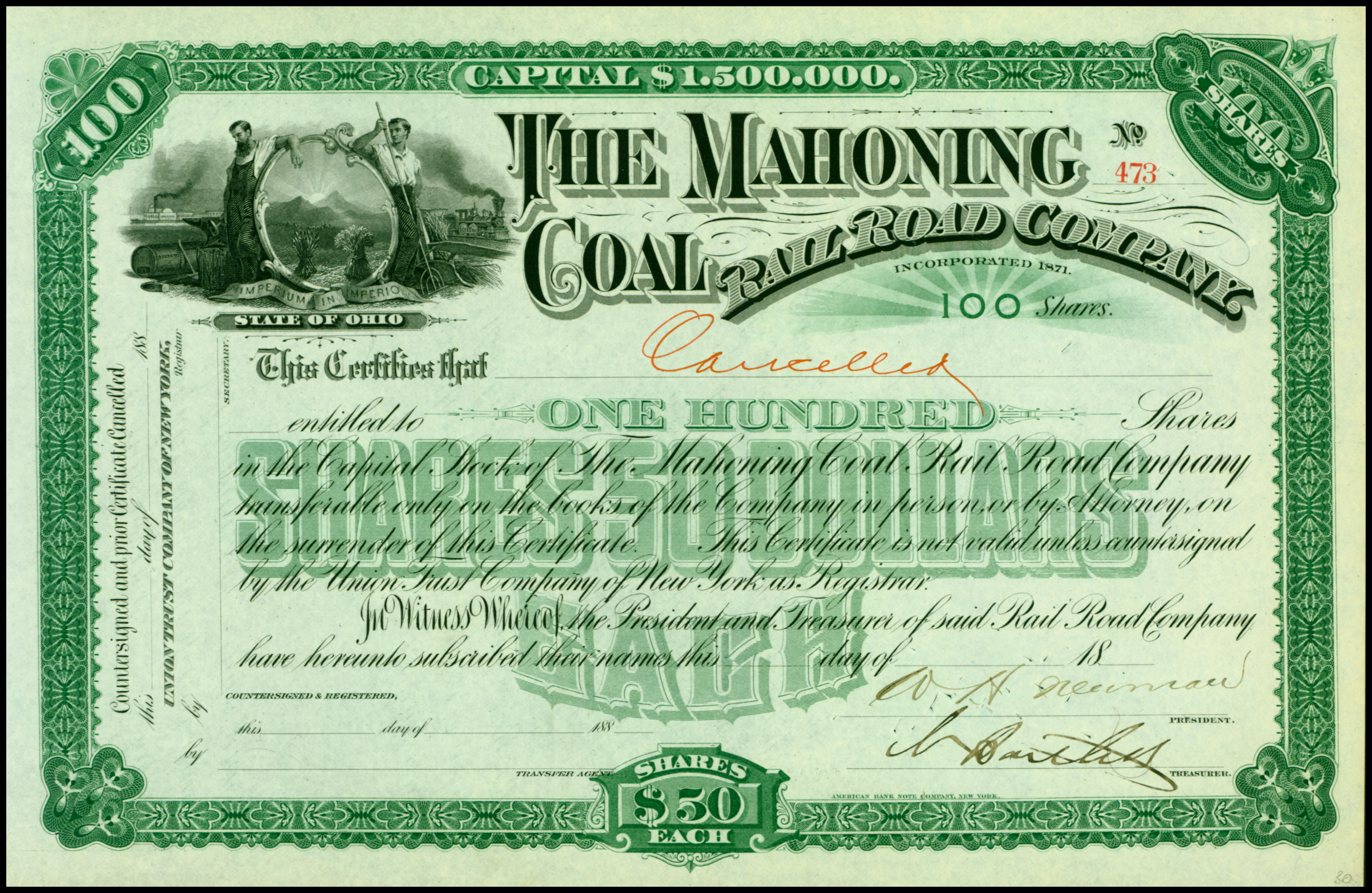
Share of the Mahoning Coal Railroad Company from the 1880s, unissued

The Mahoning Coal Railroad (MCR) was a railroad line in the U.S. states of Ohio and Pennsylvania. Incorporated in 1871, it largely linked Youngstown, Ohio, with Andover, Ohio. It had a major branch into Sharon, Pennsylvania, and several small branches and spurs to coal mines and iron works along the Ohio-Pennsylvania border. The railroad leased itself to the Lake Shore and Michigan Southern Railway in 1873. The lease was assumed by the New York Central Railroad in 1914, when that company consolidated with the Lake Shore & Michigan Southern. The New York Central merged with the Pennsylvania Railroad in 1968 to create the Penn Central. Despite abandonment of much track, bankruptcy of the Penn Central in 1970 eventually caused the MCR's dissolution on January 7, 1982.

== Incorporation and main line construction ==
The Mahoning Coal Railroad Company was incorporated in the states of Ohio and Pennsylvania on February 25, 1871, with a capital investment of $70,000 ($1,800,000 in 2024 dollars). The Cleveland-based company received a charter to build a line from Youngstown, Ohio, to Brookfield Township in Trumbull County, Ohio. On December 9, 1871, a supplement to the charter was obtained allowing the company to build a line from Liberty Township in Trumbull County, Ohio, to the Lake Shore and Michigan Southern Railway's Ashtabula Branch in Andover Township, Ashtabula County, Ohio. This 38-mile (61 km) branch required the company to increase its capitalization to $1.5 million ($39,400,000 in 2024 dollars).

Work began on the standard gauge Youngstown-Brookfield-Liberty-Andover line in June 1872. It opened to traffic on August 3, 1873.

== Construction of branch lines ==
As the Youngstown-Andover line was being built, the MCR constructed a 2.85-mile (4.59 km) long branch from Tyrrell, Ohio, to the coal mines in the southeast part of Vienna Township, Ohio (known as the "No. 9 Coal Bank Branch"), and a 0.75-mile (1.21 km) spur across the north side of Hubbard, Ohio to the blast furnaces of the Andrews & Hitchcock Iron Company.

On August 14, 1872, the MCR secured an amendment to its charter allowing it to build two new branch lines. The first was a 2-mile (3.2 km) long branch from Youngstown southeast to the hamlet of Struthers, Ohio. The second branch extended along the south side of the Mahoning River to the Foster #1 Coal Mine (537 West Hylda Avenue, Youngstown) and Foster #2 Coal Mine (intersection of Glenwood Avenue and Parkview Avenue, Youngstown) in the Fosterville neighborhood of Youngstown's south-southwestern side.

On May 1, 1873, the MCR was leased for 25 years to the Lake Shore and Michigan Southern Railway (LS&MS), with 40 percent of the gross annual revenue retained by the original investors as rent. The LS&MS made the Youngstown-Andover Branch part of its Franklin Division.

In 1882, the MCR built a 0.73-mile (1.17 km) branch east to the Keel Ridge Coal Mines on the east side of Hermitage, Pennsylvania, from its Youngstown-Andover line near Brookfield Center, Ohio.

On July 1, 1884, the LS&MS and MCR amended their lease, making it perpetual. The agreement also transferred the rights of way, track, and all equipment of the MCR to the LS&MS, effectively ending the MCR's independent existence as a railroad.

A 0.5-mile (0.80 km) branch was built from the Ohio state line east into Pennsylvania just north of Sharon, Pennsylvania, in 1887. This line was built under authority of a charter held by the Stewart Iron Company, and was used to link the Stewart works to the Youngstown-Andover line.

In 1888, the MCR began and finished its Sharon Branch, a 5.97-mile (9.61 km) branch from its Youngstown-Andover line into Sharon. On the Ohio side of the border, this included track from Doughton, Ohio (a now-abandoned village which used to exist on the north edge of what is now the Pine Lakes Golf Club on the west side of Hubbard) to the Pennsylvania state line. For the track on the Pennsylvania side, the MCR purchased the right of way from the Mahoning and Shenango Valley Railroad, which had a Pennsylvania state charter giving it authority to build there. The Hubbard spur was abandoned when the Sharon Branch was finished. A 1.77-mile (2.85 km) line from the Sharon Branch northeast to Sharpsville, Pennsylvania, was also completed at this time (under authority of the charter of the Chenango Valley Railroad. (Note: The Sharpsville spur was later abandoned when the LS&MS reached Sharpsville independently via trackage rights on the Erie Railroad.)

The MCR bought the Mahoning and Shenango Valley Railroad, the Chenango Valley Railroad, and the Stewart Railroad in 1890. It issued $400,000 in preferred stock to raise the money for the purchase. The Mahoning and Shenango Valley Railroad then became part of the LS&MS' Franklin Division.

The Vienna coal mine branch was torn up in 1899.

In 1903, the LS&MS built a "low-grade" line parallel to the MCR from Carson, Ohio, to Brookfield Center.

== Later corporate history ==
The Mahoning Coal Railroad was listed on the New York Stock Exchange on May 10, 1888. But even after it doubled the amount of preferred stock on the market in 1890, there was so little stock on the market that it was rarely traded. Indeed, no stock was traded on the open market between July 1896 and November 1910. But the railroad made a great deal of money. According to historian Thomas W. Sanderson, the MCR was the most profitable of the LS&MS' lines as of 1907 due to the immense amount of freight moving in and out of Youngstown and its nearby coal fields and mills. The MCR was also the LS&MS' only link to the rich coal fields and iron foundries of Pittsburgh and Youngstown. It routinely paid dividends of 100 percent of market value for nearly 30 years at the start of the 20th century. By November 1926, $50 par value MCR stock was trading at $805 a share. When stock did come on the market, wide swings in price occurred. It was trading at $1,000 a share in March 1927, and remained at that level until August 1927. The New York Times called MCR "the outstanding 'blue chip' of the stock market". It continued to be only rarely traded in the 1930s and early 1940s, with the Times declaring it a "stranger to the ticker tape of the New York Stock Exchange" in 1942 and subject to only "infrequent transactions" in 1944. Even as late as 1951, the stock was "infrequently traded".

=== New York Central ownership ===
The New York Central and Hudson River Railroad acquired a controlling majority in the LS&MS in 1877. In 1914, an asset restructuring and refinancing of the New York Central led to the abolishment of all subsidiary corporations and their consolidation into a new New York Central Railroad. The New York Central (NYC) assumed the lease of the MCR in December 1914.

The NYC began buying up MCR stock. By 1920, the New York Central outright controlled the road, owning 7,990 of its 13,227 outstanding shares (60.4 percent) of preferred stock and 17,893 of its 30,0000 shares (59.6 percent) of its common stock. By 1947, NYC's common stock ownership had risen to 19,440 shares (64.8 percent) of MCR's common stock.

In 1958, the New York Central increased its ownership of MCR stock even more to 24,000 shares (80 percent) of outstanding common stock. Once the NYC owned 80 percent of the company, it could pool the MCR's taxes with those of other NYCRR subsidiaries. Now, profits in one subsidiary could be offset by losses in another. This disadvantaged the remaining stockholders, however, who now found they were forced into profits or losses they did not choose. They sued, but in October 1962 the New York Supreme Court dismissed the suit.

By August 1959, only 5,990 shares of MCR common stock remained outstanding, owned by 279 people. Shares traded at $455, and for the past two decades the stock had paid annual dividends of $45 a share. Under New York Stock Exchange rules, however, whenever too few large blocks of stock in a firm remained in public hands, the exchange had the authority to delist the stock. The NYSE did so on August 20.

== Dissolution ==
In 1959, the MCR still had 62 miles (100 km) of track in use. American railroads had entered a long period of decline and financial difficulty in the post-World War II period, however. The MCR abandoned the Youngstown-Andover track in 1961, leaving it with just 35.4 miles (57.0 km) of track in 1962. The company won Interstate Commerce Commission approval to consolidate the Shenango Valley Railroad and Stewart Railroad in 1963.

=== Penn Central ownership ===
Subject to intense competition and dwindling passenger and freight traffic, the New York Central Railroad merged with the Pennsylvania Railroad on February 1, 1968, to create the Penn Central Transportation Company. The merged company immediately began cost-cutting, but losses mounted. The Penn Central declared bankruptcy on June 21, 1970.

The bankruptcy of the Penn Central led to the MCR's dissolution. In September 1970, the MCR failed to pay a dividend for the first time in its history. On January 14, 1972, the Penn Central asked the bankruptcy court for permission to abandon all MCR trackage. The Penn Central continued to operate into 1974, until President Richard Nixon signed the Regional Rail Reorganization Act on January 2. Most (but not all) of the Penn Central's tracks were turned over to a new corporation, Conrail. The Penn Central continued to operate as a freight-only railroad, but reorganization efforts failed. In March 1976, Railroad Revitalization and Regulatory Reform Act folded the remainder of the Penn Central into Conrail as well. Limited rights of way and minor trackage continued to be held by a new firm, the Penn Central Company. On October 15, 1980, President Jimmy Carter signed the Staggers Rail Act, which significantly deregulated the rail industry, allowing for swift abandonment of track.

=== Liquidation ===
In 1979, the Penn Central Company and shareholders of the Mahoning Coal Railroad reached an agreement to liquidate and dissolve the MCR. Two dividend liquidation distributions to non-Penn Central shareholders were set. The first, established at $177 a share, occurred March 11, 1980. (A small portion of the funds received from the liquidation were reserved to pay legal costs.) The second distribution, set at $120 a share, occurred on January 7, 1982, ending the existence of the Mahoning Coal Railroad.

If, after meeting the liquidation distribution requirements, any assets remained unsold, these assets were transferred to the Penn Central.

== Description of the line ==
As of 1904, the Mahoning Coal Railroad consisted of the 38.31-mile (61.65 km) Youngstown-Andover line, the 24.51-mile (39.45 km) Mann-Brookfield line (the "low-grade" line), the 6.05-mile (9.74 km) Doughton-Sharon combined branch, the 1.95-mile (3.14 km) Sharpsville branch, the 0.73-mile (1.17 km) Keel Ridge Coal Bank branch, and the 0.31-mile (0.50 km) Stewart Iron Works branch. This gave the line a total of 71.86 miles (115.65 km).

The Hubbard-Andrews & Hitchcock Iron Works spur was abandoned, and the Tyrrel-Vienna branch abandoned and torn up in 1899. The Youngstown-Andover line was abandoned in 1961.

== Bibliography ==
- Camp, Mark J. (2007). Railroad Depots of Northeast Ohio. Charleston, S.C.: Arcadia Publishing. ISBN 9780738551159.
- History of Trumbull and Mahoning Counties. Vol. 1. Cleveland: H.Z. Williams & Bro. 1882. ISBN 9785878824842.
- Lake Shore and Michigan Southern Railway Company (1884). Fourteenth Annual Report of the Lake Shore and Michigan Southern Railway Company to the Stockholders for the Year Ending December 31, 1883. Cleveland: Short & Forman, Printers and Stationers.
- Leavy, Michael (2006). The New York Central System. Charleston, S.C.: Arcadia Publishing. ISBN 9780738549286.
- Michigan Railroad Commission (1904). Thirty-Second Annual Report of the Commissioner of Railroads of the State of Michigan for the Year 1904. Lansing, Mich.: Wynkoop Hallenbeck Crawford Co.
- Moody, John (1920). Moody's Analyses of Investments and Security Ratings Books. Railroad Investments. Thirteenth Year. New York: Moody's Investors Service.
- Ohio Commissioner of Railroads and Telegraphs (1881). Annual Report of the Commissioner of Railroads and Telegraphs of Ohio for the Year Ending June 30, 1880. Columbus, Ohio: G.J. Brand & Co., State Printers. hdl:2027/uc1.b2896935.
- Pennsylvania Department of Internal Affairs (1900). Annual Report of the Secretary of Internal Affairs of the Commonwealth of Pennsylvania for the Year Ending June 30, 1899. Part 4. Railroad, Canal, Navigation, Telegraph and Telephone Companies. Harrisburg, Pa.: Wm. Stanley Ray, State Printer of Pennsylvania.
- Sanderson, Thomas W. (1907). 20th Century History of Youngstown and Mahoning County, Ohio, and Representative Citizens. Chicago: Biographical Pub. Co.
