= 1955 Great Plains tornado outbreak =

Tornado in the southern and central United States

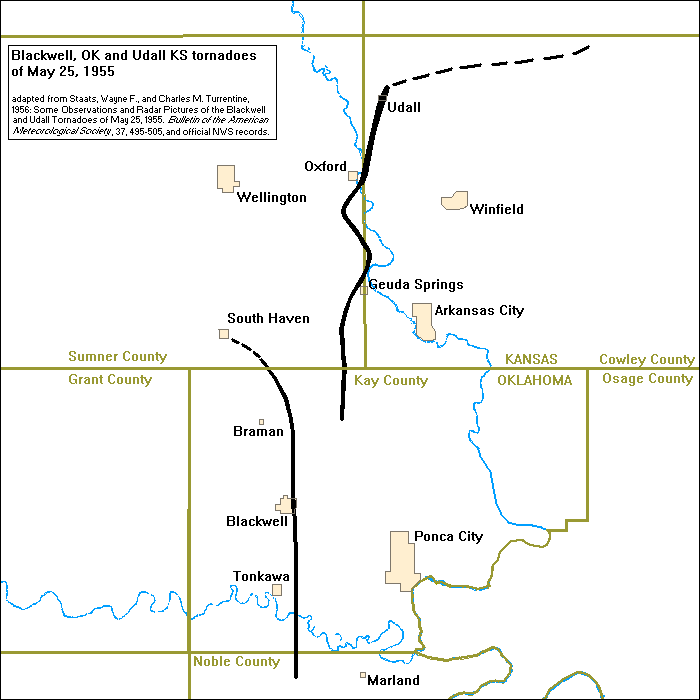
- The tracks of the 1955 Blackwell and Udall F5 tornadoes.

Meteorological history
- Duration: May 25–26, 1955

Tornado outbreak
- Tornadoes: 48
- Max. rating: F5 tornado
- Duration: ~30 hours

Overall effects
- Fatalities: 102-104 fatalities, 554 injuries
- Damage: >$30.0 million
- Areas affected: Central United States
- Part of the tornado outbreaks of 1955

The 1955 Great Plains tornado outbreak was a deadly tornado outbreak that struck the southern and central U.S Great Plains States during the afternoon and evening hours of May 25–26, 1955. At least 48 tornadoes touched down across seven states, including a deadly F4 tornado near Aberdeen, Texas; a destructive F5 tornado at Blackwell, Oklahoma; and an even deadlier F5 tornado at Udall, Kansas. In total, the outbreak killed 102 people and caused at least 554 injuries; all of the deaths and the majority of the injuries were caused by the three violent tornadoes. Unusual electromagnetic activity, including St. Elmo's fire, was observed during the event, especially from the Blackwell tornado.

== Confirmed tornadoes ==
Confirmed tornadoes by Fujita rating
FU	F0	F1	F2	F3	F4	F5	Total
0	12	17	13	3	1	2	48

- Sources: SPC Tornado data,, ,

=== May 25 event ===
List of confirmed tornadoes – Wednesday, May 25, 1955 (Note: All dates are based on the local time zone where the tornado touched down; however, all times are in Coordinated Universal Time and dates are split at midnight CST/CDT for consistency.) (Note: Prior to 1994, only the average widths of tornado paths were officially listed.)
F#	Location	County / Parish	State	Start coord.	Time (UTC)	Path length	Max. width	Summary
F0	Altus	Jackson	OK	34.67°N 99.30°W	11:00–?	0.1 miles (0.16 km)	33 yd (30 m)	A tornado embedded within a larger area of straight-line winds and hail caused minor damage, which was estimated $250.
F4	SW of Aberdeen, TX to S of Dempsey, OK	Collingsworth (TX), Wheeler (TX), Roger Mills (OK)	TX, OK		2117	50 miles (80 km)	1,100 yd (1,000 m)	2 deaths – See section on this tornado
F0	SE of Sterling City	Sterling	TX		0000	0.1 miles (160 m)	440 yd (400 m)	
F1	E of Shattuck	Ellis	OK		0000	4.9 miles (7.9 km)	400 yd (370 m)	
F1	NE of Rush Springs	Grady	OK		0000	0.1 miles (160 m)	33 yd (30 m)	
F0	NE of Mayfield	Beckham	OK		0005	3.8 miles (6.1 km)	300 yd (270 m)	
F1	NE of Kingfisher	Kingfisher	OK		0100	0.1 miles (160 m)	33 yd (30 m)	
F1	NW of Antonino	Ellis	KS		0140	0.1 miles (160 m)	33 yd (30 m)	
F2	NE of Camargo	Dewey	OK		0230	5.1 miles (8.2 km)	300 yd (270 m)	This strong tornado destroyed five houses and a trailer, and the occupant of that trailer was seriously injured. Other houses were damaged along the path as well (Grazulis 1991).
F3	S of Deer Creek	Grant	OK		0300	13.3 miles (21.4 km)	440 yd (400 m)	A house and several rural buildings were destroyed. One person was injured. Grazulis rated the tornado F2 (Grazulis 1991).
F2	NE of Tonkawa	Kay	OK		0300	2.7 miles (4.3 km)	500 yd (460 m)	This strong tornado destroyed at least four houses, numerous barns, and granaries. The tornado may have reached F3 intensity according to Grazulis (Grazulis 1991).
F5	SE of Tonkawa, OK to South Haven, KS	Noble (OK), Kay (OK), Sumner (KS)	OK, KS		0326	28.4 miles (45.7 km)	500 yd (460 m)	20 deaths – See section on this tornado
F5	E of Peckham, OK to NE of Atlanta, KS	Kay (OK), Sumner (KS), Cowley (KS)	OK, KS		0400	56.4 miles (90.8 km)	1,300 yd (1,200 m)	80 deaths – See article on this tornado
F1	E of Rotan	Fisher	TX		0430	0.3 miles (480 m)	440 yd (400 m)	
F1	W of Martha	Jackson	OK		0500	6.2 miles (10.0 km)	300 yd (270 m)	
F2	SW of Benjamin	Knox	TX		0530	11.9 miles (19.2 km)	300 yd (270 m)	This strong tornado destroyed a barn and damaged two houses (Grazulis 1991).
F2	Wichita Falls area	Wichita	TX		0738	1.3 miles (2.1 km)	33 yd (30 m)	
Source: SPC Tornado data, Historical Tornado Cases for North America 1950-1959, NCDC reports, CDNS report, Grazulis 1991

=== May 26 event ===
List of confirmed tornadoes – Thursday, May 26, 1955 (Note: All dates are based on the local time zone where the tornado touched down; however, all times are in Coordinated Universal Time and dates are split at midnight CST/CDT for consistency.) (Note: Prior to 1994, only the average widths of tornado paths were officially listed.)
F#	Location	County / Parish	State	Start coord.	Time (UTC)	Path length	Max. width	Summary
F2	E of Osage City to Leavenworth	Osage, Douglas, Leavenworth	KS		0627	66.2 miles (106.5 km)	33 yd (30 m)	This long-tracked tornado, which may have been a tornado family based on its skipping damage path, leveled barns, and produced $200,000 in rural farm damage (Grazulis 1991).
F0	Velma area	Stephens	OK		0830	0.1 miles (160 m)	33 yd (30 m)	
F1	N of Chickasha	Grady	OK		0830	0.1 miles (160 m)	33 yd (30 m)	
F1	South Oklahoma City	Oklahoma	OK		0900	0.5 miles (800 m)	50 yd (46 m)	
F1	E of Moore	Cleveland	OK		0900	11.6 miles (18.7 km)	70 yd (64 m)	
F0	SW of Shawnee	Pottawatomie	OK		0930	0.1 miles (160 m)	33 yd (30 m)	
F0	Cushing	Payne	OK		1000	0.1 miles (160 m)	33 yd (30 m)	
F0	Durant	Bryan	OK		1120	4.5 miles (7.2 km)	50 yd (46 m)	
F1	Sallisaw to NE of Stony Point	Sequoyah	OK		1245	14.2 miles (22.9 km)	400 yd (370 m)	
F1	Joplin	Jasper	MO		1300	2.7 miles (4.3 km)	50 yd (46 m)	
F0	Corsicana	Navarro	TX		1430	0.1 miles (160 m)	3 yd (2.7 m)	
F1	SW of Clarksburg	Moniteau	MO		1545	0.2 miles (320 m)	10 yd (9.1 m)	
F2	E of Coatsburg	Adams	IL		1750	1.5 miles (2.4 km)	500 yd (460 m)	
F0	N of McPherson	McPherson	KS		1900	0.1 miles (160 m)	33 yd (30 m)	
F2	SE of Pekin	Tazewell	IL		2049	1.5 miles (2.4 km)	100 yd (91 m)	
F1	Burbank	Cook	IL		2200	1.5 miles (2.4 km)	100 yd (91 m)	
F1	W of Filckerville to W of Beecher	Kankakee, Will	IL		2230	18.7 miles (30.1 km)	400 yd (370 m)	
F3	Jessieville area to NW of Pinnacle	Garland, Saline	AR		2245	28.8 miles (46.3 km)	1,000 yd (910 m)	This tornado damaged 23 homes, primarily in the community of Blakely with total losses being estimated at $200,000. Grazulis rated the tornado F2 (Grazulis 1991).
F1	SE of Hubbard	Dakota	NE		2300	4.3 miles (6.9 km)	17 yd (16 m)	
F2	SE of Pleasant Valley	Perry	AR		2320	4.5 miles (7.2 km)	880 yd (800 m)	This tornado destroyed five barns and damaged six others (Grazulis 1991).
F2	NE of Wayne	Wayne	NE		2330	6.5 miles (10.5 km)	167 yd (153 m)	Buildings were destroyed on five farms (Grazulis 1991).
F2	W of St. Joseph, MO	Doniphan	KS		2330	7.8 miles (12.6 km)	220 yd (200 m)	Eight buildings on a farm were destroyed, while two other farms were also damaged.
F0	N of Norborne	Carroll	MO		0000	0.2 miles (320 m)	10 yd (9.1 m)	This brief tornado unroofed and shifted a farmhouse 20 feet (6.1 m) off its foundation. Grazulis rated the tornado F2 due to roof removal (Grazulis 1991).
F0	S of Redfield	Bourbon	KS		0030	0.1 miles (160 m)	33 yd (30 m)	
F0	NW of Baxter Springs	Cherokee	KS		0100	0.1 miles (160 m)	33 yd (30 m)	
F1	SW of Koshkonong	Howell	MO		0100	2 miles (3.2 km)	10 yd (9.1 m)	
F1	SW of Linneus	Linn	MO		0100	0.2 miles (320 m)	10 yd (9.1 m)	
F2	N of Worthington	Schuyler	MO		0200	11.7 miles (18.8 km)	27 yd (25 m)	This strong tornado snapped hundreds of trees and destroyed many homes on five separate farms. A couple was injured when their home was nearly leveled, indicating possible F3 damage (Grazulis 1991).
F2	'SW of Weldon	Woodruff, Jackson	AR		0220	7.5 miles (12.1 km)	33 yd (30 m)	This strong tornado destroyed six homes and damaged 25 others (Grazulis 1991).
Source: SPC Tornado data, Historical Tornado Cases for North America 1950-1959, NCDC reports, CDNS report, Grazulis 1991

=== Wellington–Aberdeen, Texas/Sweetwater–Dempsey, Oklahoma ===
Wellington–Aberdeen, Texas/Sweetwater–Dempsey, Oklahoma
Meteorological history
- Date: May 25, 1955

F4 tornado
- on the Fujita scale
- Highest winds: 207–260 mph (333–418 km/h)

Overall effects
- Fatalities: 2
- Injuries: 18

This violent F4 tornado moved northeast from 10 to 12 miles north of Wellington, Texas, and passed just east of Aberdeen. The tornado ended northeast of Sweetwater, Oklahoma, or just south of Dempsey.

F4 damage occurred in both Texas and Oklahoma. 13 farm homes were destroyed, some of which were swept away. 100 cattle were killed and a car was carried 700 feet (0.13 mi). Two people were killed on the Oklahoma side of the path, and 18 were injured in both states.

=== Tonkawa–Blackwell, Oklahoma/South Haven, Kansas ===
Tonkawa–Blackwell, Oklahoma/South Haven, Kansas
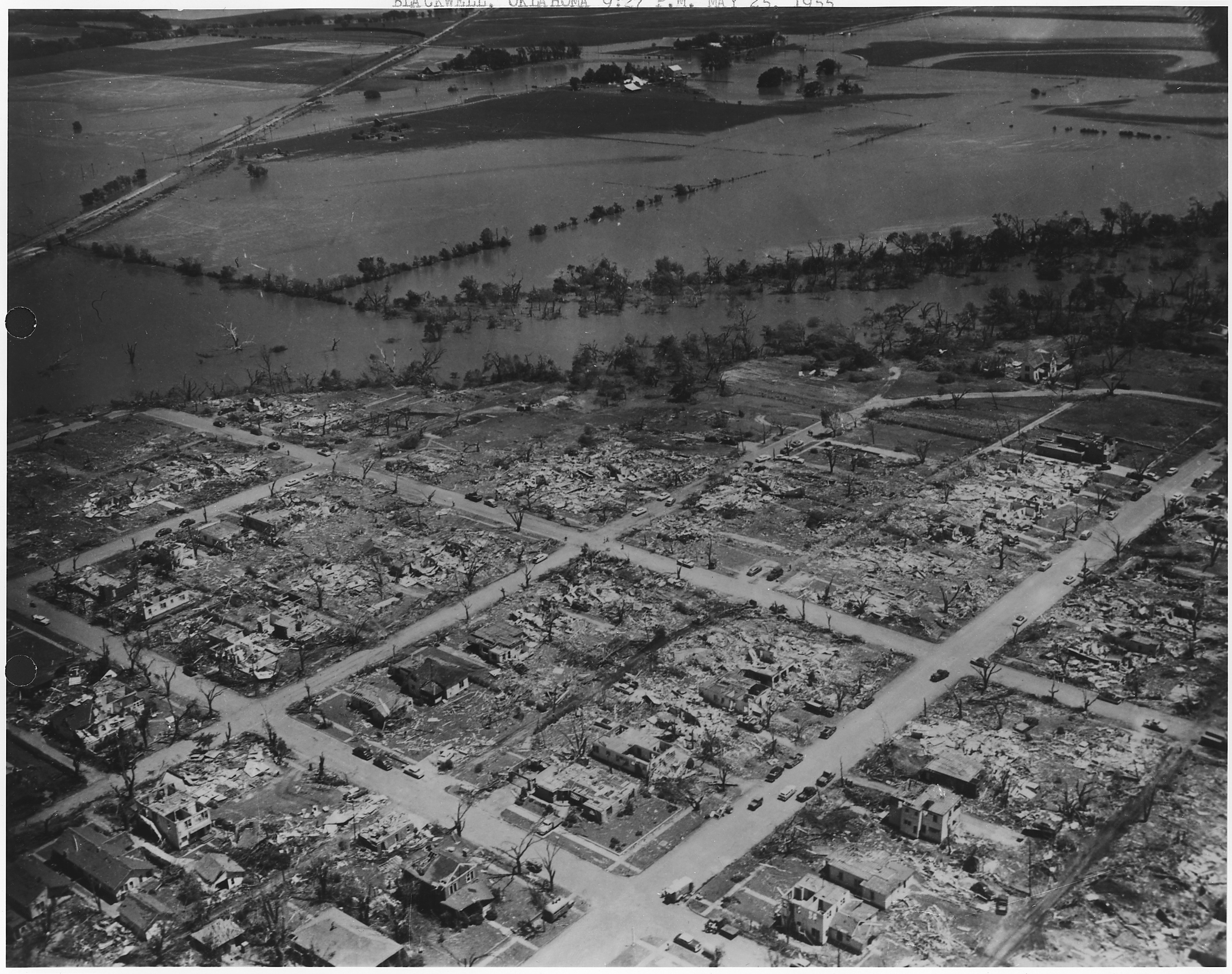
- F3 to F5-level damage on the eastern part of Blackwell, Oklahoma, where 20 people were killed.

F5 tornado
- on the Fujita scale
- Highest winds: 261 to 318 mph (420 to 512 km/h)

Overall effects
- Fatalities: 20
- Injuries: 280

This deadly and powerful tornado formed in extreme northern Noble County at around 9:00 p.m. CDT, just west of Marland, before crossing the county line, passing east of Tonkawa, and through the eastern portions of the Kay County town of Blackwell as an F5 tornado up to 400 yards (370 m) wide (Grazulis 1991).

It claimed the lives of 20 people in Blackwell and injured over 200 before crossing into and dissipating over Sumner County, Kansas. Along with the Acme Foundry and the Hazel Atlas Glass plant, the tornado destroyed or swept away at least 400 homes and caused damage to approximately 500 other homes. 60 businesses were also destroyed, and the local hospital sustained major damage. Most of the western half of the town was spared the worst of the damage. Multiple eyewitnesses reported seeing a prominent blue light in the funnel.

=== Braman, Oklahoma/Geuda Springs–Oxford–Udall–Atlanta, Kansas ===
Braman, Oklahoma/Geuda Springs–Oxford–Udall–Atlanta, Kansas
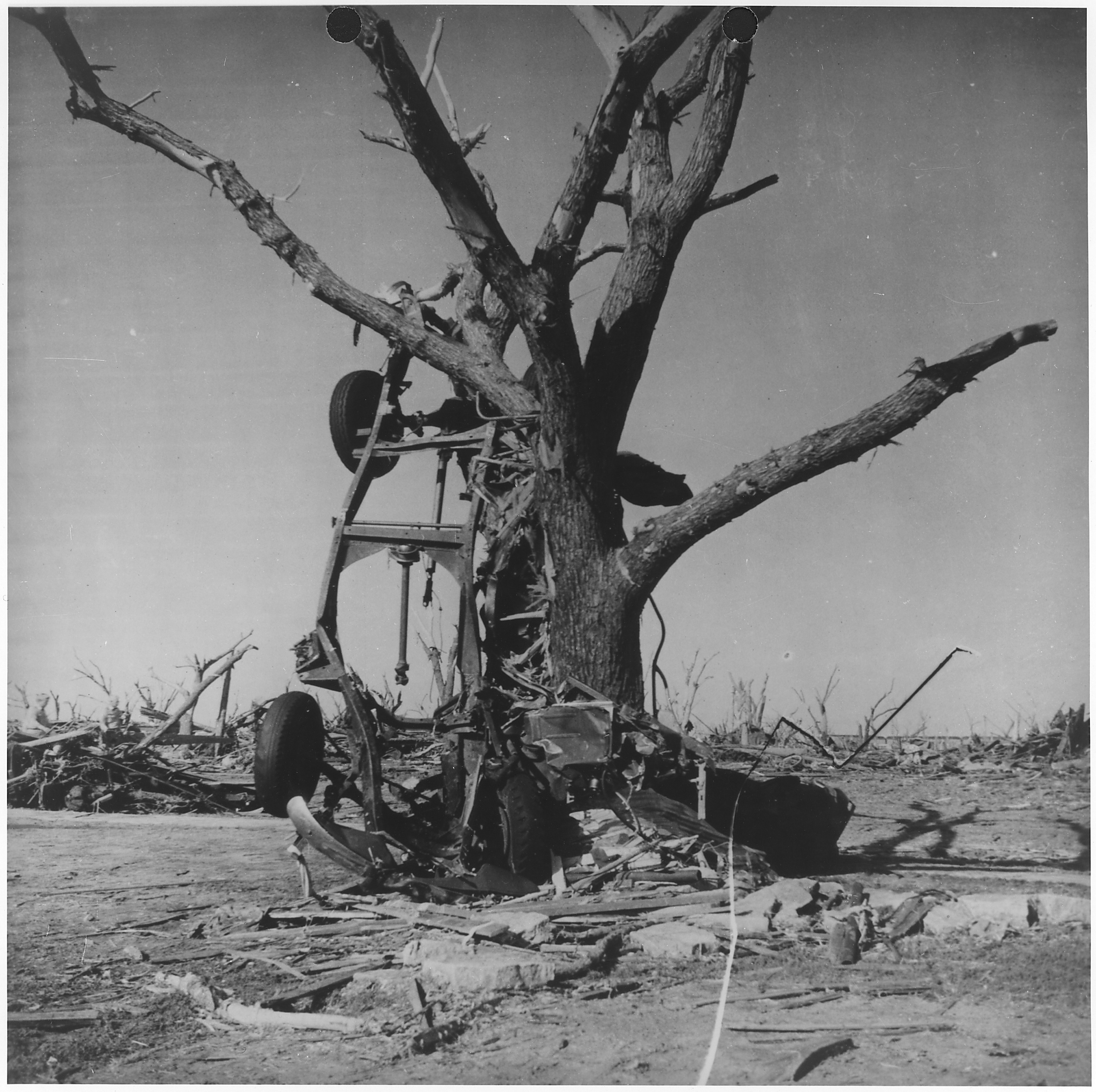
- A vehicle that was wrapped around a large tree in Udall, Kansas. F5-level winds were not needed for this to occur, according to Thomas P. Grazulis, the author of Significant Tornadoes.

F5 tornado
- on the Fujita scale
- Highest winds: 261 to 318 mph (420 to 512 km/h)

Overall effects
- Fatalities: 80-82; Deadliest in the state of Kansas; Meteorologist Eric Brown has the death toll at 82, while other official sources and Thomas P. Grazulis have listed this event as killing 80 people.
- Injuries: 273

About 30 minutes after producing the Blackwell tornado, the same supercell produced this large, violent, and long-tracked tornado just east of the first tornado track near the Kansas/Oklahoma border. It proceeded northward across Sumner and Cowley Counties. The town of Udall was especially hard hit with F5 damage that included the disintegration of numerous structures and homes all across the town. Even the town's water tower was toppled. The funnel, about 1,300 yards (1,200 m) wide, hit Udall at around 10:30 p.m. CDT. Half of the town's population was killed or injured. Numerous homes and businesses were destroyed, many of which were swept away, including a 30-by-40-foot concrete block building that was obliterated, with the foundation left mostly bare of any debris. Vehicles were thrown hundreds of yards and mangled beyond recognition, including a pickup truck that was wrapped around a tree and stripped of everything but its frame and tires. The Udall public school building sustained major damage, with beams snapped and blown away. The tornado later dissipated after traveling over 50 miles (80 km) from the Oklahoma border to southeast of Wichita.

Almost immediately, volunteers and rescue workers descended into the darkness to aid the survivors. Ambulances and automobiles of all kinds rushed the growing numbers of injured to hospitals in three neighboring towns. The closest hospitals were William Newton and St Mary's Hospitals, 17 miles southeast in Winfield, the former of which took in 129 patients that night. Several were taken to St Luke's Hospital in Wellington, 23 miles to the southwest, while the remainder were taken to three hospitals in Wichita to the northwest. This tornado was the deadliest in the state's history with 80 fatalities and 273 injuries.

== Other tornadoes and further notes ==
Outbreak death toll
State	Total	County	County total
Kansas	80-82	Cowley	75-77
Kansas	80-82	Sumner	5
Oklahoma	22	Kay	20
Oklahoma	22	Roger Mills	2
Totals	102-104		
All deaths were tornado-related

In addition to the F5 tornadoes, NWS officials confirmed an additional F2 tornado near Tonkawa which may have been either part of the Blackwell tornado or a satellite tornado. Other tornadoes in the region occurred on May 27 near the same region but did little damage. Among them were those produced by a thunderstorm which traveled through the Oklahoma City, Oklahoma area, where it produced weak tornadoes with minimal damage in the towns of Norman and Chickasha. The final tornado in the hardest-hit region occurred during the early morning hours of May 26 when a weak tornado occurred in Salisaw in Sequoyah County near the Arkansas border.

Numerous tornadoes occurred across the Midwestern states from Arkansas to Illinois. The strongest tornado was located near the Little Rock area, but no fatalities were reported with this tornado or any other on May 26. While filming the movie Picnic in Halstead, Kansas, a tornado swept through the area, forcing the cast and crew to take cover. While the storm spared the set, it devastated the nearby town of Udall, and the film crew drove their trucks and equipment there to help clean up the damage. Actress Rosalind Russell, one of the stars of the film, agreed to appear during a baseball game in Wichita to cast the opening pitch and make a plea for funds to help the tornado victims.

== See also ==
- List of North American tornadoes and tornado outbreaks
- List of F5 tornadoes
- Radio atmospheric

== Bibliography ==
- Thomas P. Grazulis (1993). Significant Tornadoes 1680–1991, A Chronology and Analysis of Events. The Tornado Project of Environmental Films. ISBN 1-879362-00-7 (hardcover).
