= Vondell Brook =

Stream in Mille Lacs County, Minnesota, U.S.

Coordinates: 45°42′45″N 93°35′41″W

Vondell Brook is a stream in Mille Lacs County, in the U.S. state of Minnesota. It is a tributary of the Rum River.

The brook's headwaters are in a wetland in the city of Bock, Minnesota. It flows to Milaca, then into the Rum River approximately 2 miles (3.2 km) northeast of the city of Pease.

Vondell Brook bears the name of a local lumberman.

== See also ==
- List of rivers of Minnesota
