= 1955 Scottsbluff tornado =

1955 tornado in Nebraska, U.S.

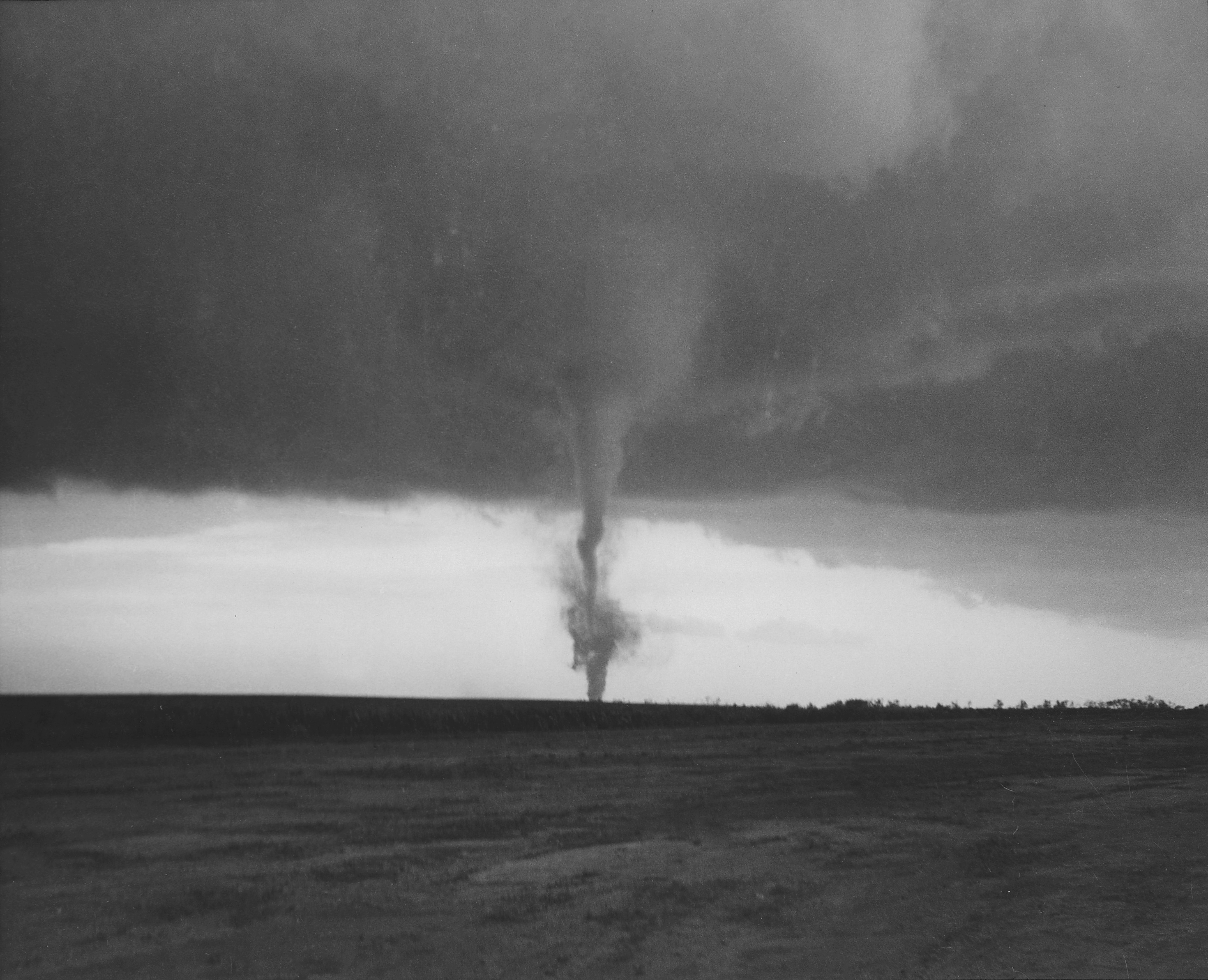
- The tornado displaying multiple vortices near Scottsbluff

Meteorological history
- Date: June 27, 1955
- Formed: 3:30 pm (MST)
- Dissipated: 5:30 pm (MST)

F4 tornado
- on the Fujita scale

Overall effects
- Fatalities: 2
- Injuries: 40+
- Areas affected: Scotts Bluff County, Nebraska
- Part of the Tornadoes of 1955

In the afternoon hours of June 27, 1955, a violent and well documented multiple-vortex tornado moved through the communities of Henry, Morrill, Scottsbluff and Minatare, all located in the state of Nebraska. The tornado, known informally by the National Weather Service as the Scottsbluff, Nebraska Tornado, was the most well-documented tornado in history at the time of the event. The tornado was one of the first multi-vortex tornadoes to be captured on film and in photographs; over eighty photographs were taken of the tornado along its 40-mile (64 km) path.

== Meteorological synopsis ==
The tornado was associated with a supercellular storm that tracked over the North Platte Valley at approximately 7.5–9.3 miles per hour (12.1–15.0 km/h) during a period spanning shortly over two hours. At the time of the tornado, the cloud base was 4,000 feet (1,200 m) above ground level. All thirteen confirmed tornadoes, including the Scottsbluff tornado, dropped in the southeastern portions of the storm, moving in various directions.

== Tornado summary ==
The first confirmed sighting of the tornado on the ground was from a resident of Henry, who saw the tornado first form as a waterspout west of the town. The tornado picked up water as it crossed over the North Platte River, forming a visible condensation funnel made of water particles. At this point, the tornado was moving directly to the east, which was confirmed by at least one other observer who saw the tornado form. As it hit Henry, the tornado produced minor damage to cottonwood trees.

In an October 1955 Publication of the Monthly Weather Review, meteorologist Edgar L. Van Tassel wrote that "it appeared as though a giant hand had reached down grasping the tree tops and pulled upward until the roots were freed from the soil and then the trees were dropped", noting damage in Henry. For approximately 3 miles (4.8 km) to the east of Henry, the tornado produced no discernible ground damage, before deroofing a farmhouse as it moved into a valley. Two people were in the house, both of whom survived the event.

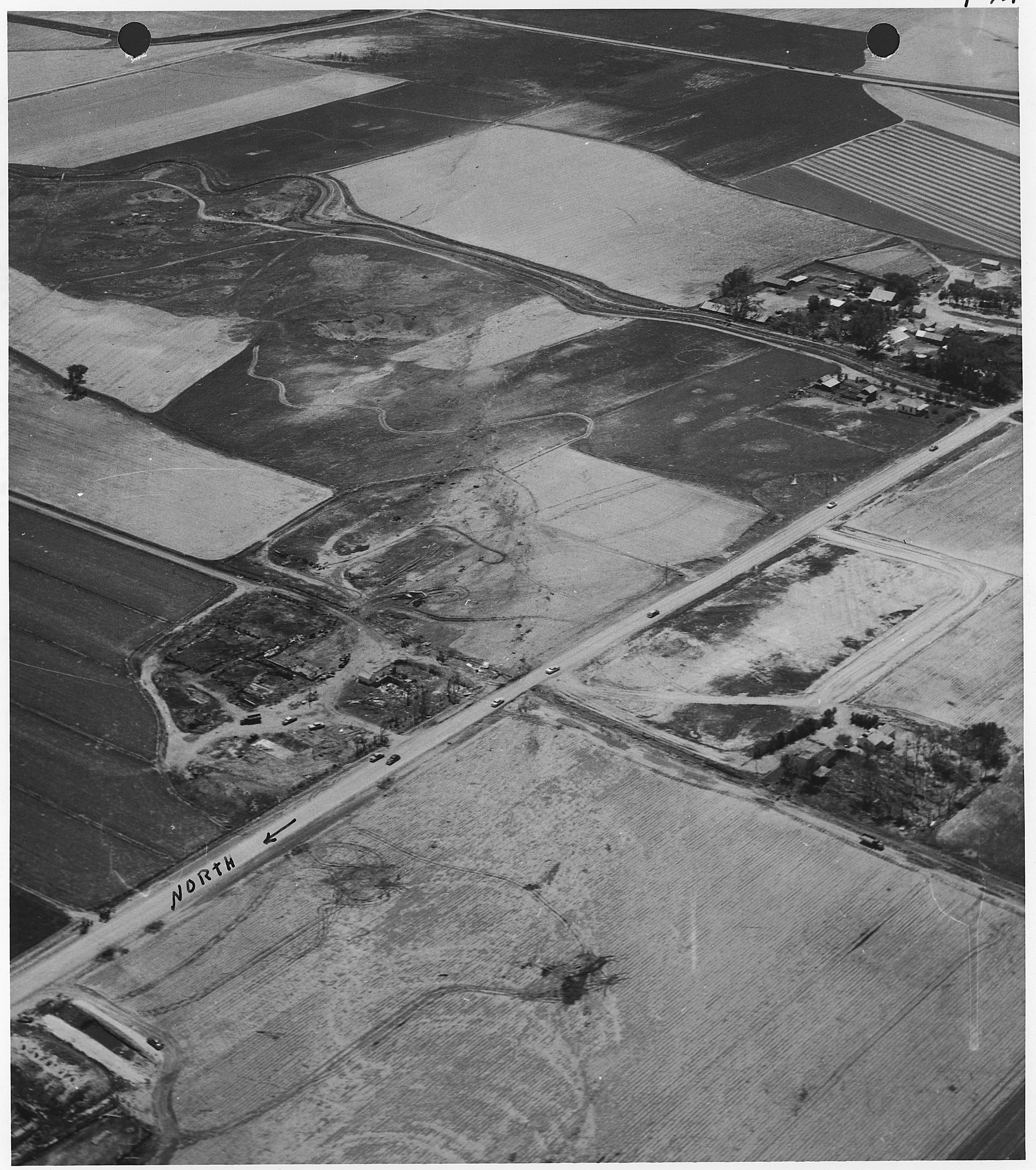
Cycloidal marks produced by the tornado near Scottsbluff

Shortly after impacting the farmhouse, it was noted that the tornado's damage path "skipped" and was discontinuous. Seven visible funnel clouds were observed as the tornado was in this phase, although the tornado itself lost the condensation funnel it had formed when moving over the river earlier along its path. The tornado curved to the southeast and then abruptly changed its direction, moving directly east. The tornado was observed firmly on the ground 2 miles (3.2 km) west of Mitchell, where it stayed on the ground until dissipating later.

Prior to reaching the ground, uncertainty existed around whether the tornado was on the ground due to the lack of a continuous path, although the path past Mitchell was confirmed by residents who observed and documented the tornado as it moved by. The tornado exhibited abrupt changes in direction as it neared the town of Scottsbluff, where it turned to the south and curved east several times. It tracked over rural areas for the majority of its life, although it directly hit one housing project containing seventeen units; both fatalities recorded from the tornado took place at this location. One death took place in a vehicle and the other occurred when a large vehicle landed on a boy as he was taking shelter in a ditch.

The tornado destroyed a total of 146 structures and injured 40 others, along a 40 mi (64 km) path spanning around two hours on the ground. Damage from the tornado received an F4 rating on the Fujita scale.

== Documentation ==
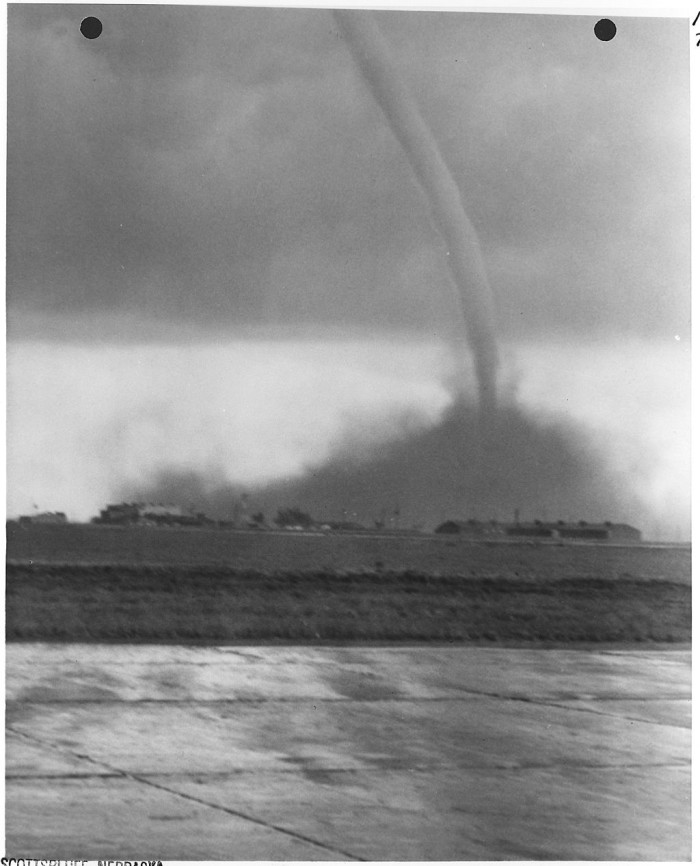
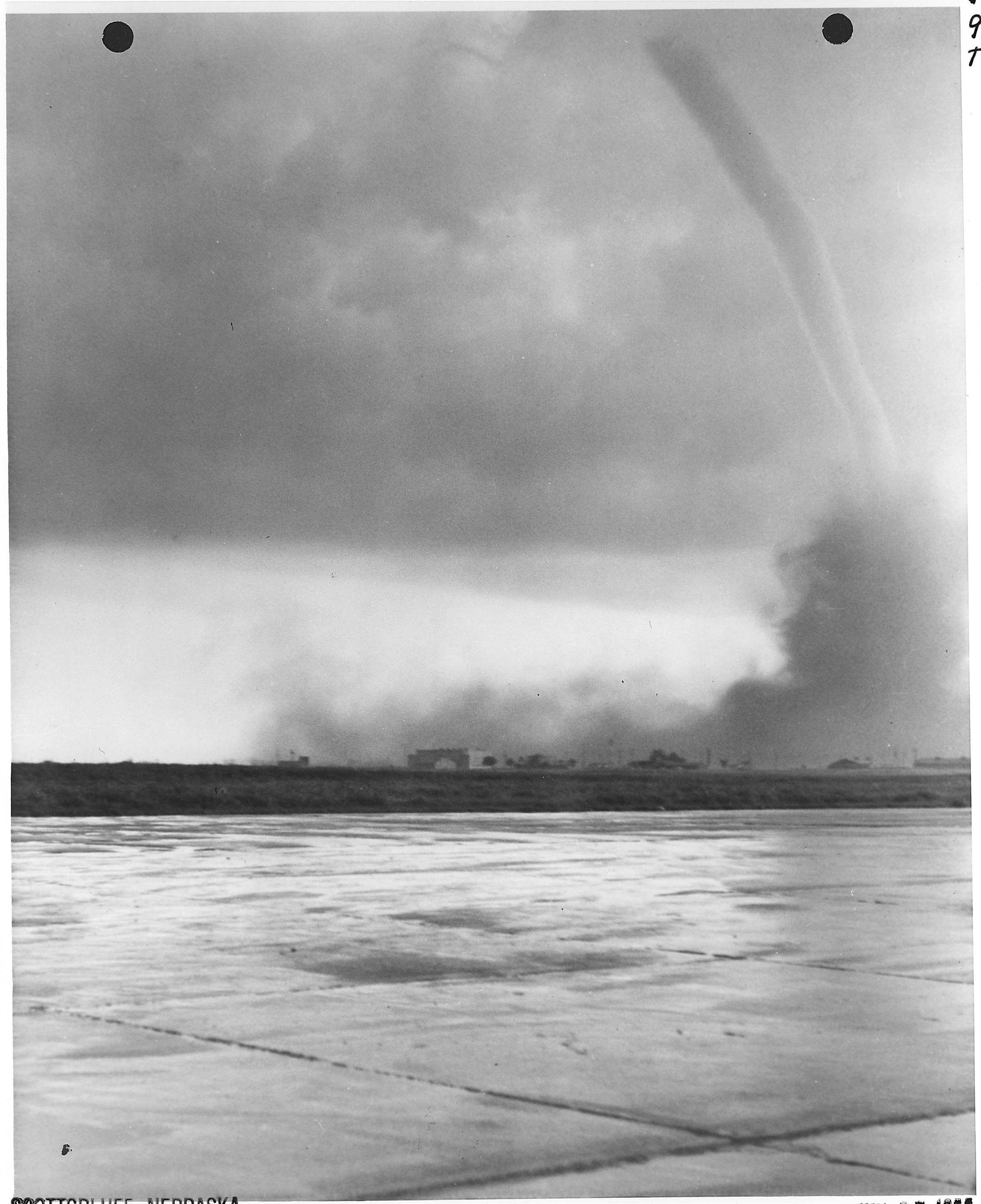
The tornado passing the Weather Bureau office on the grounds of the Western Nebraska Regional Airport

At the time of the event, the tornado was the most well-documented in history. Over 90 black-and-white photos and ten videos were taken by witnesses along the tornado's path. Using photographs of the tornado, meteorologists were able to calculate precise measurements of the tornado's height and width. The tornado was also visible on modified AN/APS-2 radars that were used by the Weather Bureau Office (WBO), where eight photos were taken of the storm's structure. A defined hook echo is visible in the radar photographs taken by the WBO; the tornado passed less than 1 mile (1.6 kilometres) to the south of the radar site, cutting off power to the site and preventing further radar observations as it moved to the southeast.

=== Cycloidal marks ===
Northeast of Scottsbluff, near the end of the tornado's path, cycloidal debris marks were documented in aerial shots after the event. At the time, cycloidal marks were an unknown phenomenon, and the marks left by the Scottsbluff tornado were the subject of a detailed study. The cycloidal marks, in conjunction with radar, were used to determine the forward speed of the tornado and showed the tornado's abrupt movements.

== Gallery ==
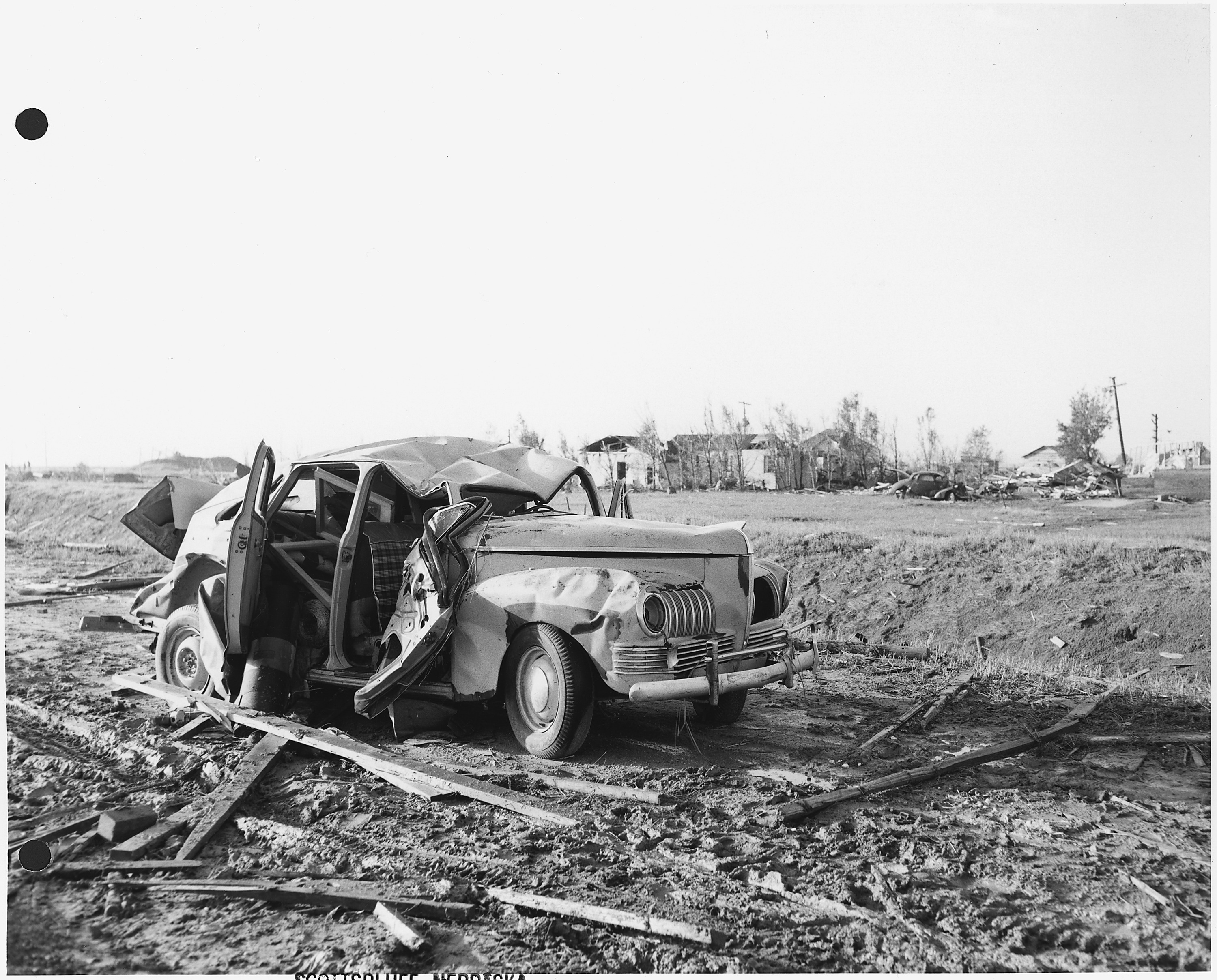
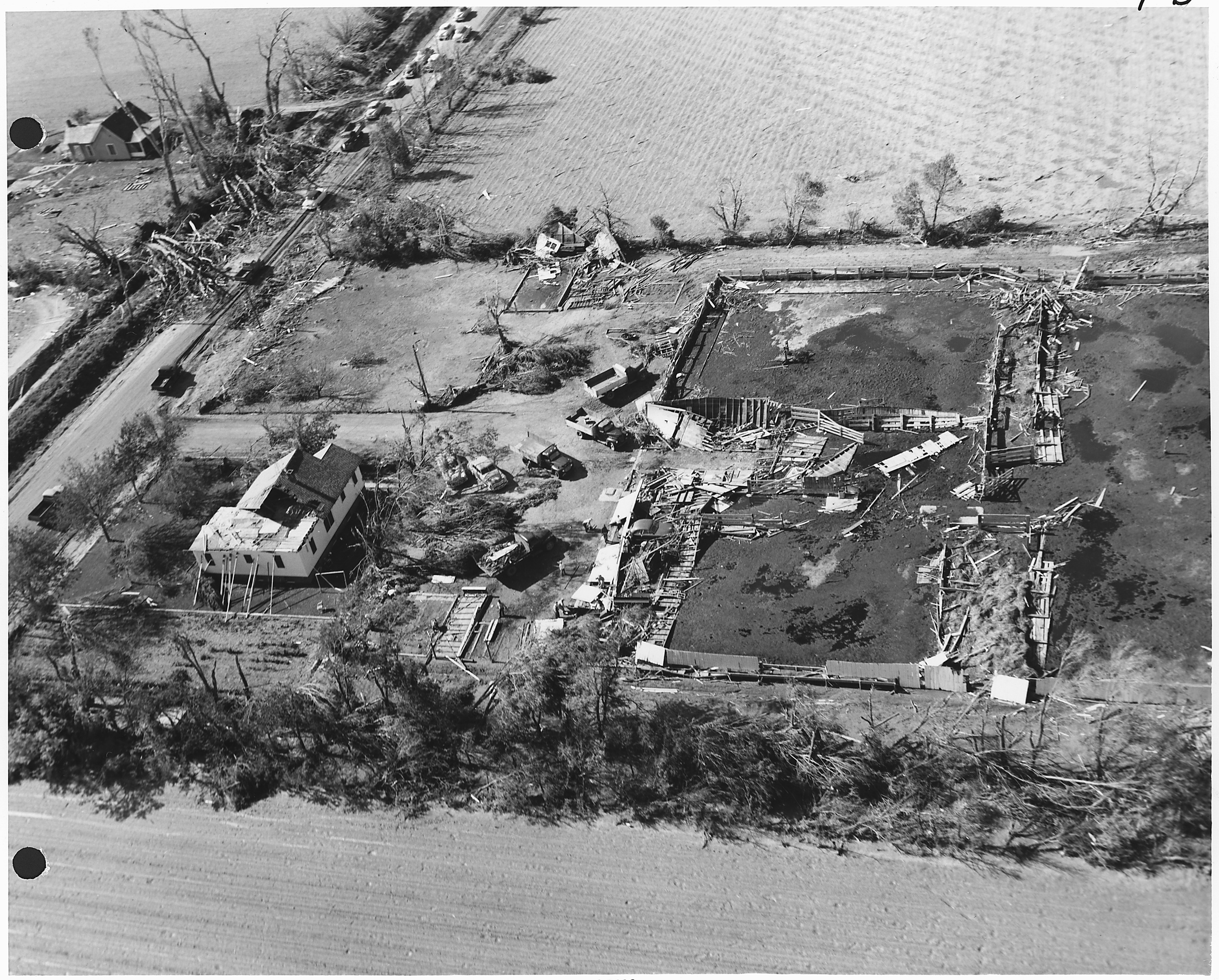
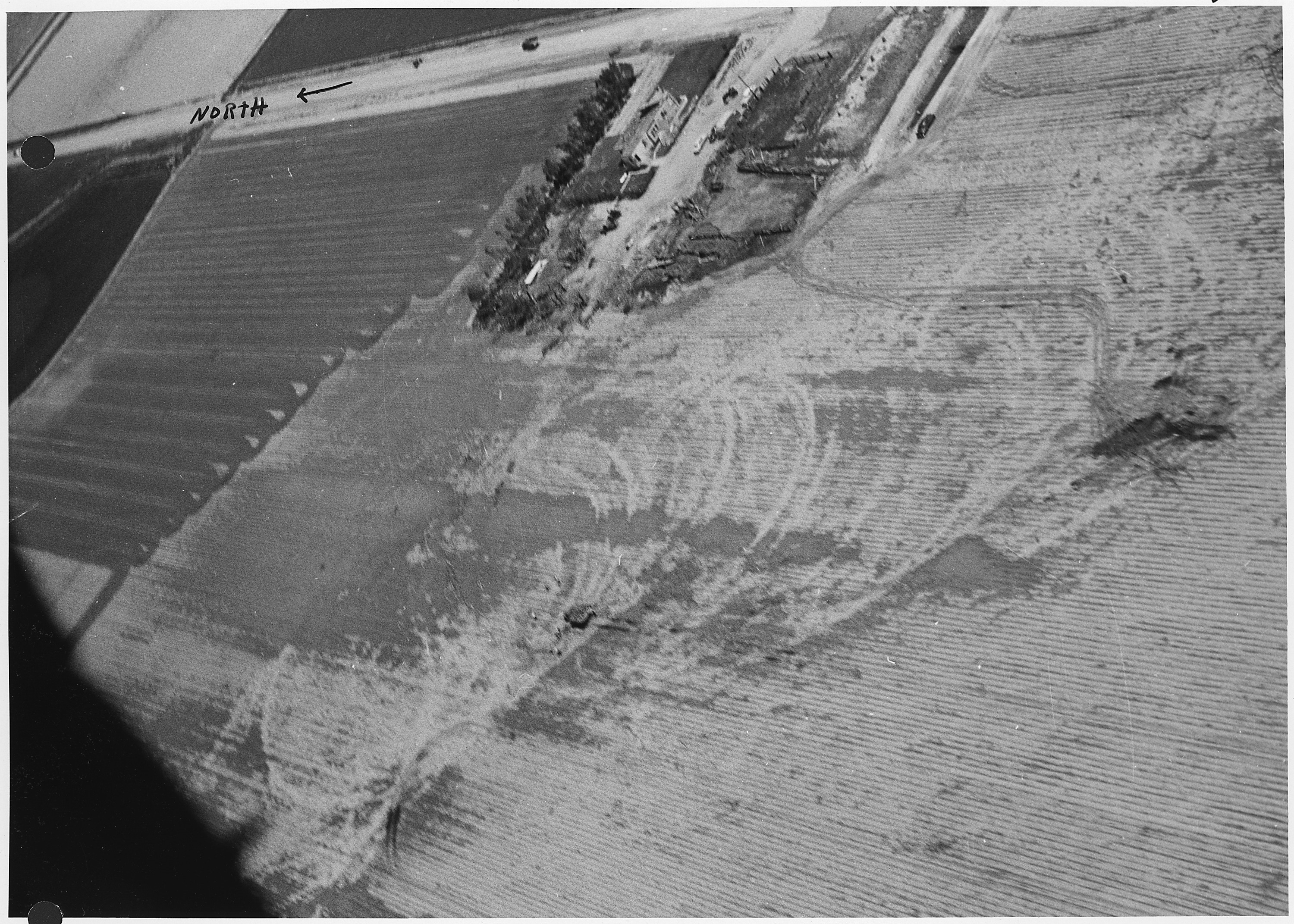
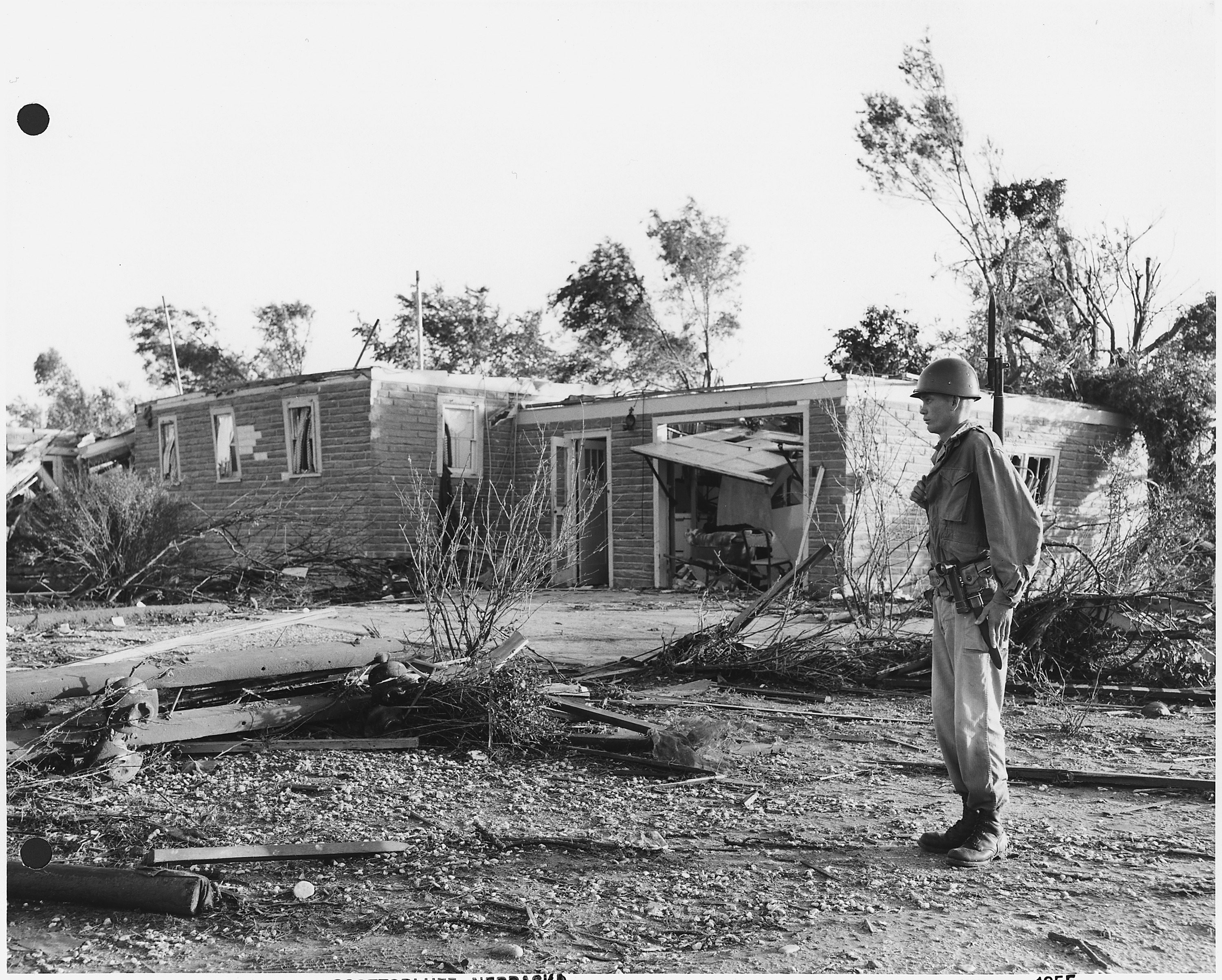
Various images of damage produced by the tornado, including cycloidal marking (second from right).

== See also ==
- List of F4 tornadoes (1950–1959)
- History of tornado research

== Citations and sources ==
=== Sources ===
- Beebe, Robert G. (March 1958). "Notes on Scottsbluff, Nebraska, Tornadoes, 27 June 1955". American Meteorological Society. 40 (3): 109–116. doi:10.1175/1520-0477-40.3.109.
- Van Tassel, Edgar L. (October 1955). "THE NORTH PLATTE VALLEY TORNADO OUTBREAK OF JUNE 27, 1955" (PDF). American Meteorological Society.
