= 1955 Udall tornado =

Tornado in Kansas and Oklahoma, US

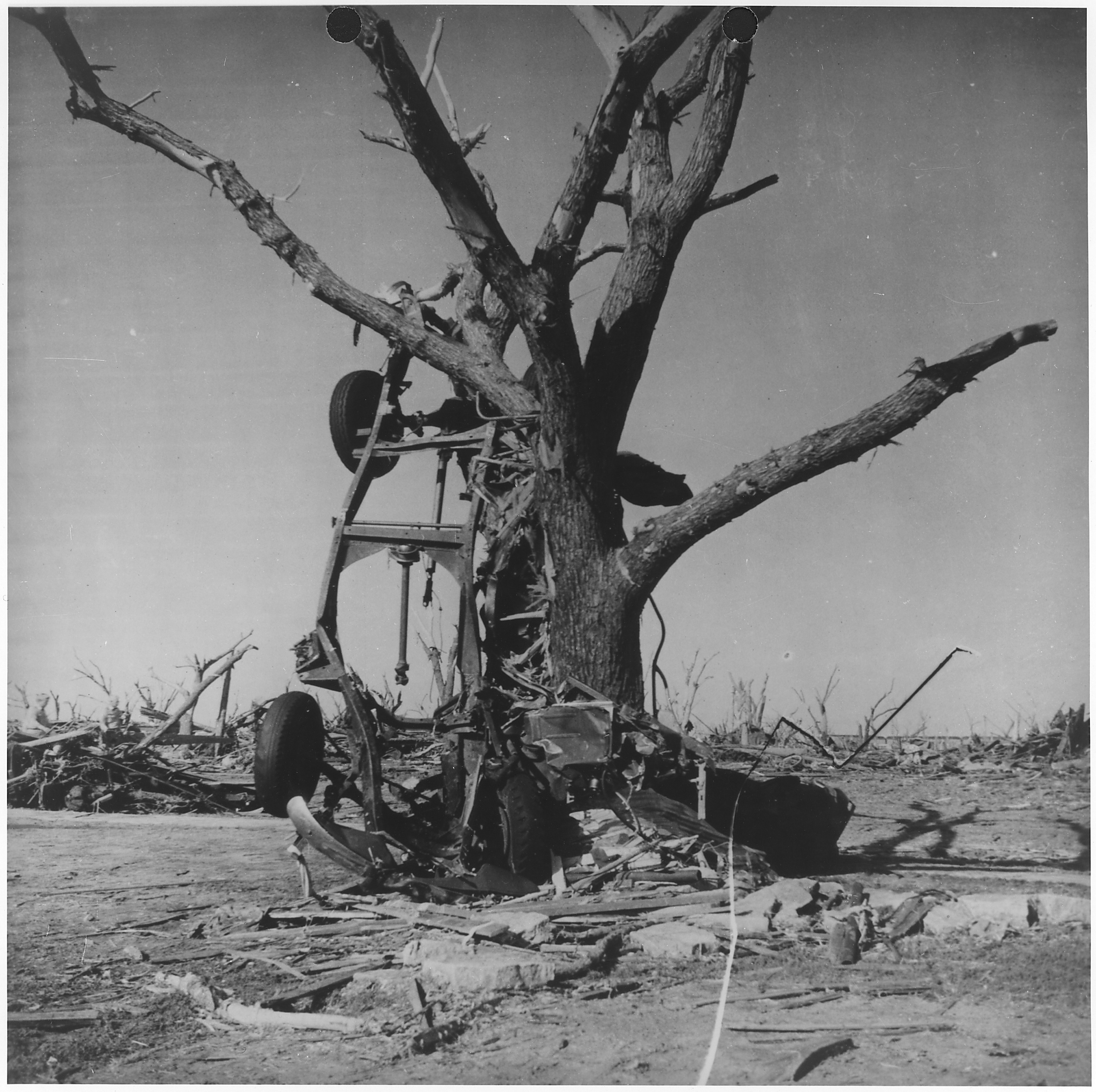
- A vehicle that was wrapped around a large tree in Udall, Kansas.

Meteorological history
- Date: May 25, 1955

F5 tornado
- on the Fujita scale
- Highest winds: 261 to 318 mph (420 to 512 km/h)

Overall effects
- Fatalities: 80 (Note: Deadliest in the state of Kansas)
- Injuries: 273
- Damage: $2.225 million ($26.7 million in 2025)
- Part of the Tornadoes of 1955 and 1955 Great Plains tornado outbreak

On May 25, 1955, an extremely violent tornado moved across southern Kansas and northern Oklahoma, destroying the town of Udall, Kansas. The tornado would be the deadliest in Kansas history. In total, 75-77 residents of Udall were killed and 270 were injured, with a total fatality count of 80, and a total injury count of 273. About 70% of the population of Udall was killed or wounded. Prior to the touchdown of the Udall tornado, another F5 tornado produced by the same storm hit Blackwell, Oklahoma.

== Meteorological synopsis ==
During May 25, a maritime Tropical (mT) air mass pushed northward through Oklahoma, covering the entire state by 6:30 P.M. At that time, a low-pressure area was situated over the Oklahoma Panhandle. The lifted index value was between -9 and -11 in Oklahoma and Kansas. Scattered thunderstorms occurred throughout the day in western Oklahoma, with damaging winds and hail reported. Earlier in the day, an F4 tornado had killed two people. Two separate severe weather warnings were issued in the area in the afternoon. However, due to technology at the time, TV stations showed no indication of the impending danger. The supercell that produced the Udall tornado was first spotted on radar north of Oklahoma City at around 6:50 P.M. It would first produce an F5 tornado that would hit Blackwell, Oklahoma, before going on to produce another F5 that would devastate the town of Udall, Kansas.

== Tornado summary ==
About 30 minutes after producing the Blackwell tornado, the same supercell produced this large and violent and long-tracked tornado just east of the first tornado track near the Kansas/Oklahoma border. It proceeded northward across Sumner and Cowley Counties. The town of Udall was especially hard hit with F5 damage that included the disintegration of numerous structures and homes all across the town. Even the town's water tower was toppled. The funnel, about 1,300 yards (1,200 m) wide, hit Udall at around 10:30 p.m. CDT. Half of the town's population was killed or injured. Numerous homes and businesses were destroyed, many of which were swept away, including a 30-by-40 foot concrete block building that was obliterated, with the foundation left mostly bare of any debris. Vehicles were thrown hundreds of yards and mangled beyond recognition, including a pickup truck that was wrapped around a tree and stripped of everything but its frame and tires. The Udall public school building sustained major damage, with beams snapped and blown away. The tornado later dissipated after traveling over 50 miles (80 km) from the Oklahoma border to southeast of Wichita.

Almost immediately, volunteers and rescue workers descended into the darkness to aid the survivors. Ambulances and automobiles of all kinds rushed the growing numbers of injured to hospitals in three neighboring towns. The closest hospitals were William Newton and St Mary's Hospitals, 17 miles southeast in Winfield, the former of which took in 129 patients that night. Several were taken to St Luke's Hospital in Wellington, 23 miles to the southwest, while the remainder were taken to three hospitals in Wichita to the northwest.

== Aftermath ==
This tornado was the deadliest in the state's history. In Udall, 75-77 people were killed, and 270 were injured, which meant that about 70% of Udall's population were casualties of the tornado. Damage totals were over $2 million, with only one building in the entire town remaining habitable after the tornado. Among the people who helped with the cleanup were the crew of the film Picnic, which was being filmed in Halstead. The Udall tornado sparked changes in the issuance of tornado warnings and technology. Comparisons have been drawn with the Greensburg tornado, with improved technology and information relaying being credited with the relatively low death toll in Greensburg.

== See also ==
- List of F5, EF5, and IF5 tornadoes
