= Pease, Minnesota =

City in Minnesota, United States

- City
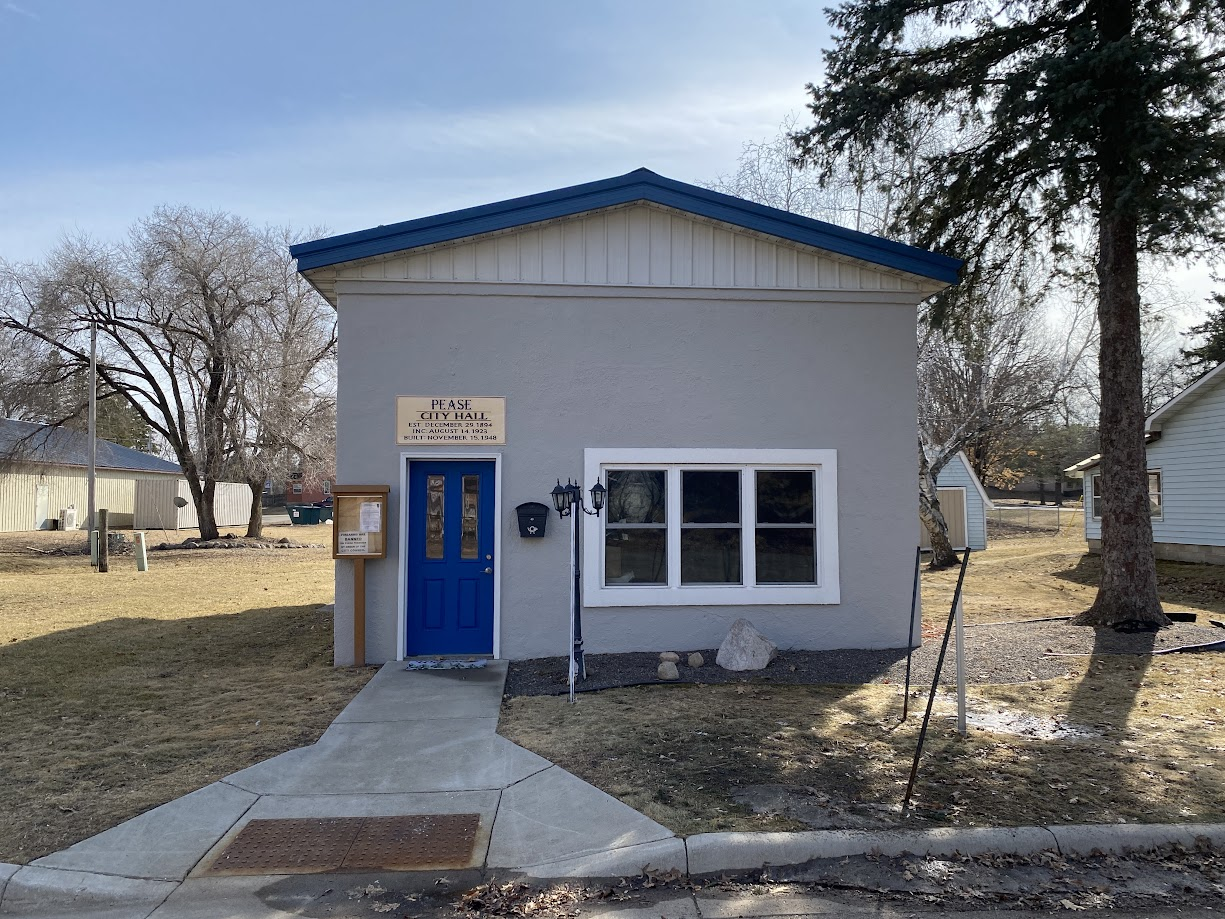
- City hall of Pease, Minnesota

- Location in Mille Lacs County and the state of Minnesota
- Coordinates: 45°41′53″N 93°38′54″W
- Country: United States
- State: Minnesota
- County: Mille Lacs

Area
  - Total: 0.53 sq mi (1.37 km^{2})
  - Land: 0.53 sq mi (1.37 km^{2})
  - Water: 0 sq mi (0.00 km^{2})
- Elevation: 1,037 ft (316 m)

Population (2020)
  - Total: 238
  - Density: 451.0/sq mi (174.12/km^{2})
- Time zone: UTC-6 (Central (CST))
  - Summer (DST): UTC-5 (CDT)
- ZIP code: 56363
- Area code: 320
- FIPS code: 27-50056
- GNIS feature ID: 0649215
- Website: cityofpease.com

Pease is a city in Mille Lacs County, Minnesota, United States. The population was 238 at the 2020 census.

== History ==
A post office called Pease was established in 1894, and remained in operation until 1994. Pease was named by railroad officials.

== Geography ==
Pease is in southern Mille Lacs County, approximately 60 miles (97 km) north-northwest of Minneapolis. U.S. Route 169 runs along the eastern border of the city, leading north 4 miles (6 km) to Milaca, the county seat, and south 10 miles (16 km) to Princeton.

According to the U.S. Census Bureau, Pease has a total area of 0.53 square miles (1.37 km^{2}), of which 0.001 square miles (0.003 km^{2}), or 0.19%, are water.

The confluence of Vondell Brook and Rum River is approximately 2 miles (3.2 km) northeast of Pease.

== Demographics ==
Historical population
Census	Pop.	Note	%±
1930	133		—
1940	126		−5.3%
1950	179		42.1%
1960	191		6.7%
1970	187		−2.1%
1980	174		−7.0%
1990	178		2.3%
2000	163		−8.4%
2010	242		48.5%
2020	238		−1.7%
U.S. Decennial Census

=== 2010 census ===
As of the census of 2010, there were 242 people, 86 households, and 63 families residing in the city. The population density was 265.9 inhabitants per square mile (102.7/km^{2}). There were 93 housing units at an average density of 102.2 per square mile (39.5/km^{2}). The racial makeup of the city was 97.9% White, 0.8% Asian, 0.8% from other races, and 0.4% from two or more races. Hispanic or Latino of any race were 1.7% of the population.

There were 86 households, of which 44.2% had children under the age of 18 living with them, 50.0% were married couples living together, 12.8% had a female householder with no husband present, 10.5% had a male householder with no wife present, and 26.7% were non-families. 19.8% of all households were made up of individuals, and 5.8% had someone living alone who was 65 years of age or older. The average household size was 2.81 and the average family size was 3.11.

The median age in the city was 29.3 years. 31.8% of residents were under the age of 18; 8.6% were between the ages of 18 and 24; 26.8% were from 25 to 44; 26.6% were from 45 to 64; and 6.2% were 65 years of age or older. The gender makeup of the city was 51.2% male and 48.8% female.

=== 2000 census ===
As of the census of 2000, there were 163 people, 62 households, and 40 families residing in the city. The population density was 376.4 inhabitants per square mile (145.3/km^{2}). There were 67 housing units at an average density of 154.7 per square mile (59.7/km^{2}). The racial makeup of the city was 100.00% White. Hispanic or Latino of any race were 1.23% of the population.

There were 62 households, out of which 41.9% had children under the age of 18 living with them, 54.8% were married couples living together, 9.7% had a female householder with no husband present, and 33.9% were non-families. 27.4% of all households were made up of individuals, and 11.3% had someone living alone who was 65 years of age or older. The average household size was 2.63 and the average family size was 3.22.

In the city, the population was spread out, with 31.9% under the age of 18, 6.7% from 18 to 24, 36.8% from 25 to 44, 12.9% from 45 to 64, and 11.7% who were 65 years of age or older. The median age was 30 years. For every 100 females, there were 111.7 males. For every 100 females age 18 and over, there were 113.5 males.

The median income for a household in the city was $35,833, and the median income for a family was $40,000. Males had a median income of $30,179 versus $23,333 for females. The per capita income for the city was $17,344. About 12.5% of families and 10.2% of the population were below the poverty line, including 7.8% of those under the age of eighteen and 12.5% of those 65 or over.

== Gallery ==
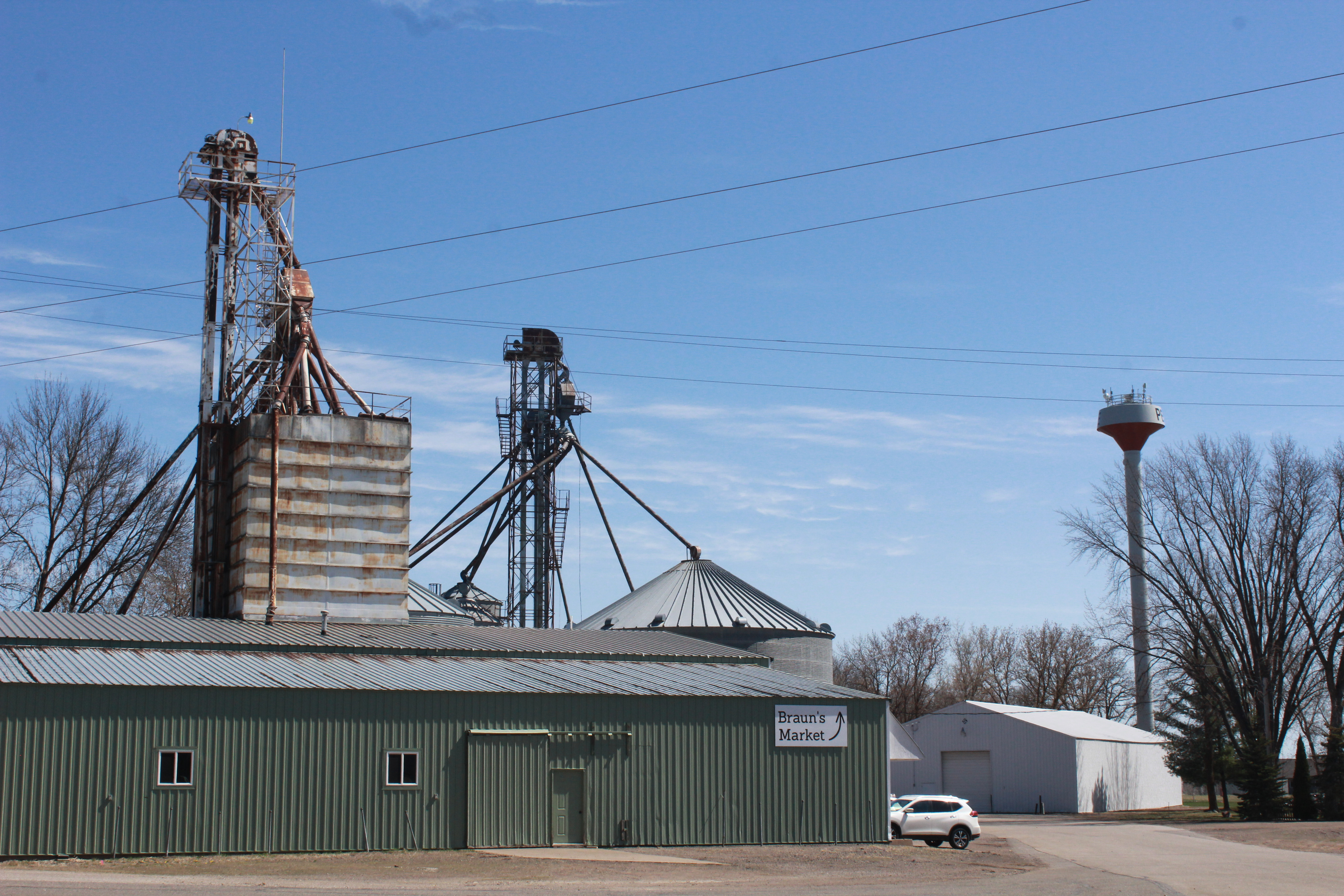
Grain elevator

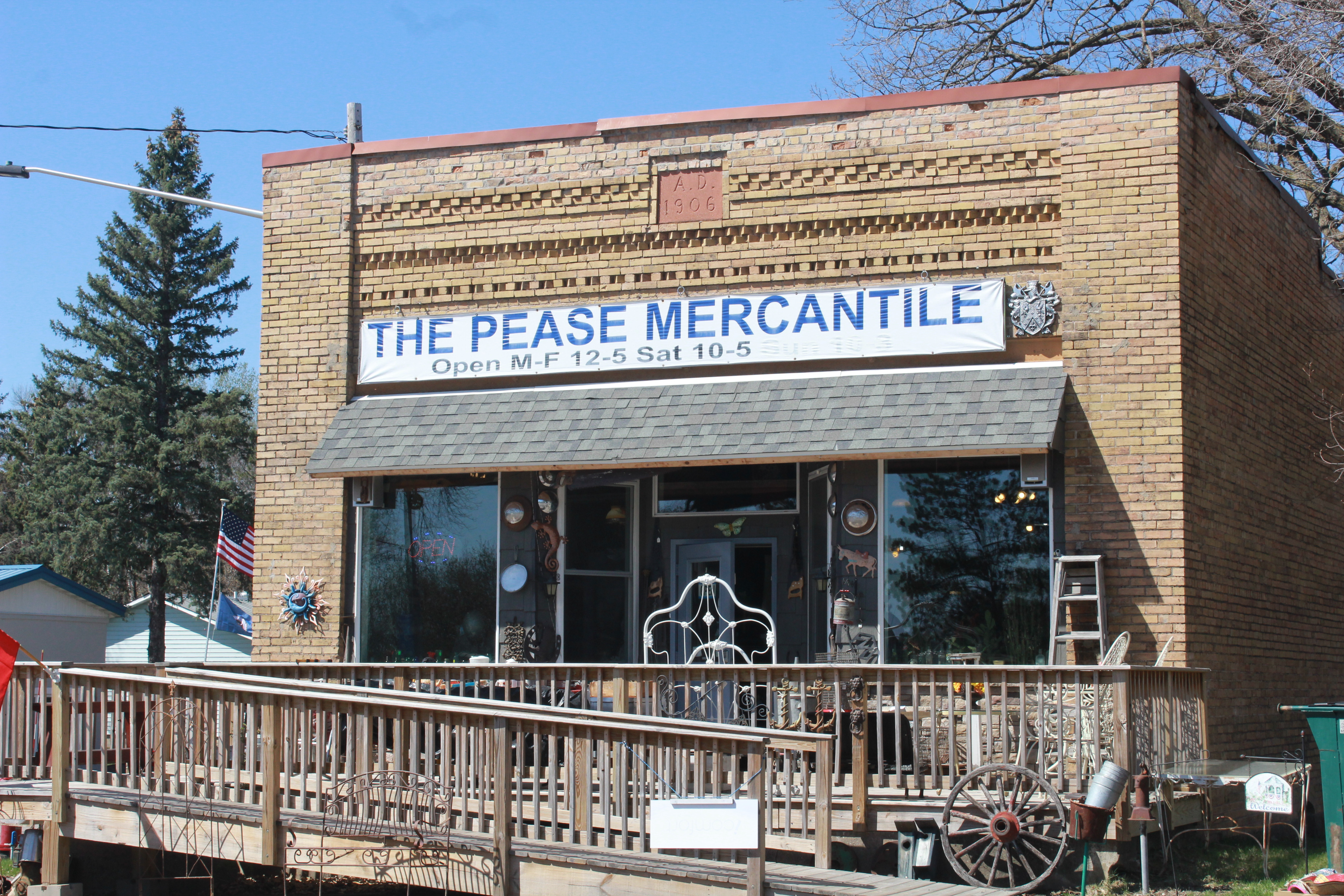
Pease Mercantile

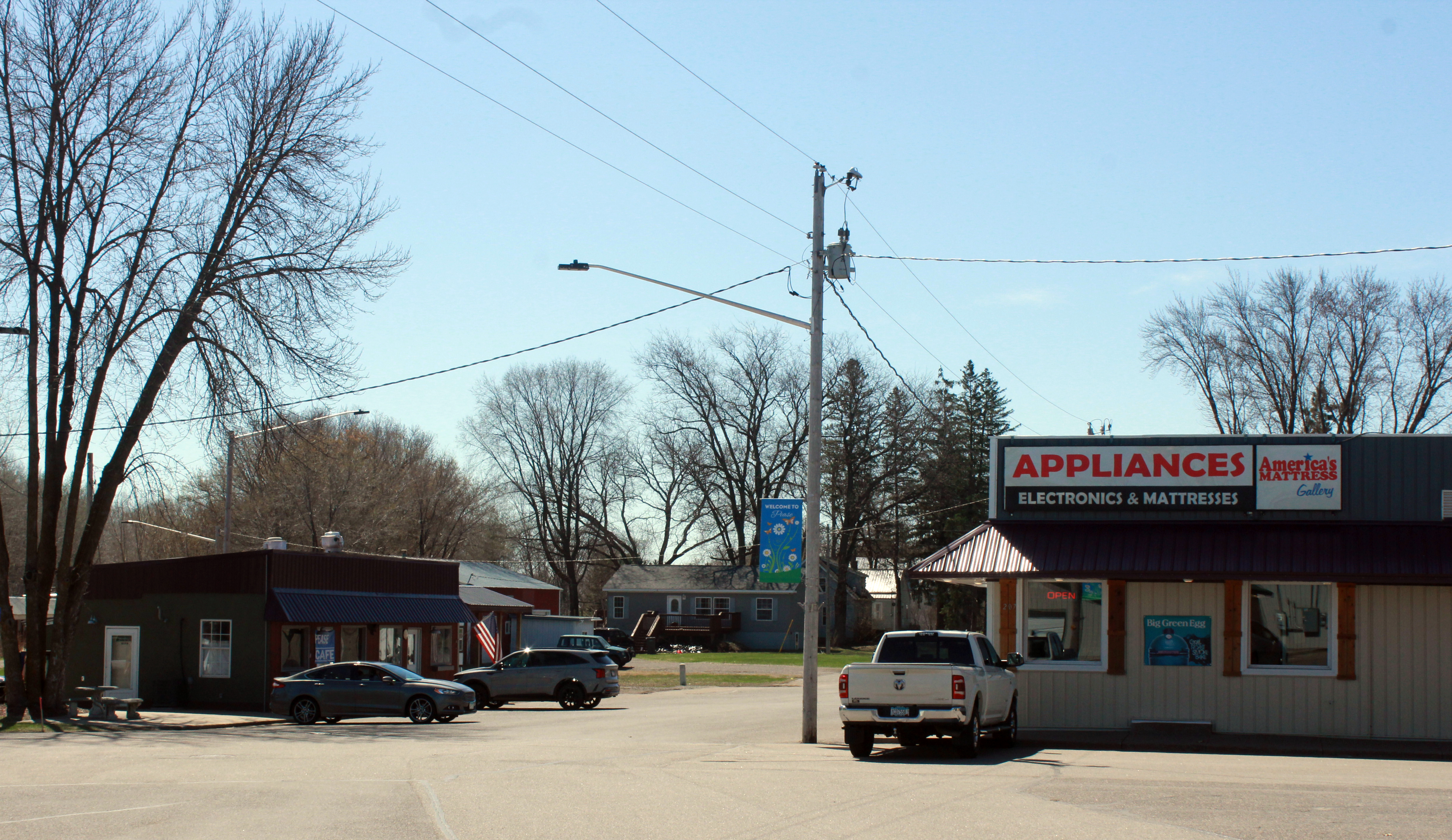
Businesses on Central Avenue
