= Bock, Minnesota =

City in Minnesota, United States

- City
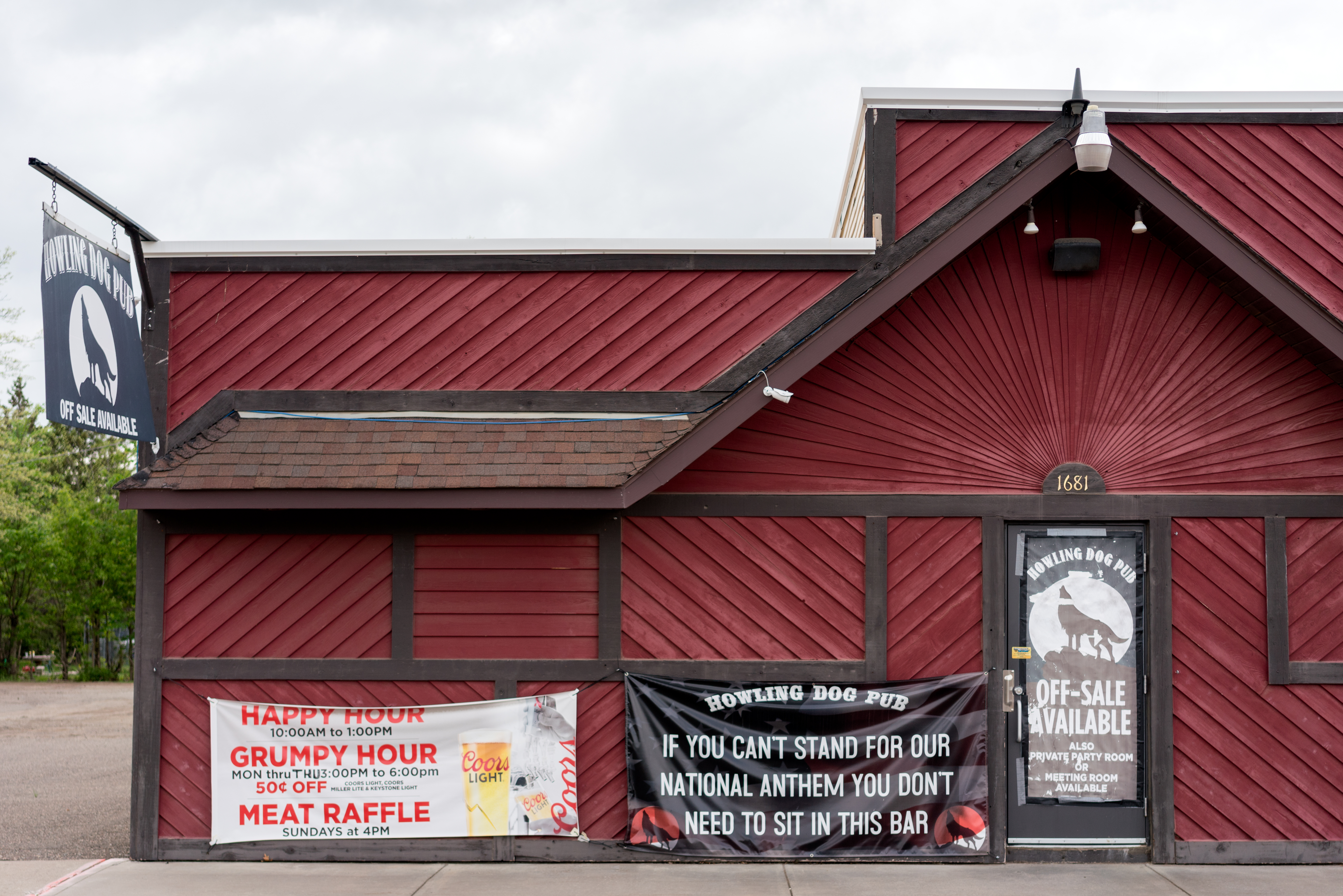
- Business establishment in Bock
- Motto: Seven Meters Closer to God than Milaca
- Location in Mille Lacs County and the state of Minnesota
- Coordinates: 45°47′04″N 93°33′10″W
- Country: United States
- State: Minnesota
- County: Mille Lacs

Government
  - Mayor: Adam Booth
  - Clerk: Pat Buss

Area
  - Total: 0.17 sq mi (0.43 km^{2})
  - Land: 0.17 sq mi (0.43 km^{2})
  - Water: 0 sq mi (0.00 km^{2})
- Elevation: 1,083 ft (330 m)

Population (2020)
  - Total: 78
  - Density: 466.0/sq mi (179.94/km^{2})
- Time zone: UTC-6 (Central (CST))
  - Summer (DST): UTC-5 (CDT)
- ZIP code: 56313
- Area code: 320
- FIPS code: 27-06814
- GNIS feature ID: 2394211

Bock is a city in Mille Lacs County, Minnesota, United States. The population was 78 at the 2020 census, down from 106 in 2010.

== History ==
A post office called Bock was established in 1892. Bock was named by railroad officials.

== Geography ==
Bock is in southeastern Mille Lacs County, 5 miles (8 km) northeast of Milaca, the county seat. Minnesota Highway 23 serves as a main route in the community, running through the northern part of the city. The highway leads southwest to Milaca and northeast 7 miles (11 km) to Ogilvie.

According to the U.S. Census Bureau, Bock has an area of 0.17 square miles (0.44 km^{2}), all land. The city sits on high ground between Bogus Brook to the east and a tributary of Vondell Brook to the west. Both brooks are south-flowing tributaries of the Rum River, itself a south-flowing tributary of the Mississippi River.

=== Transportation ===
- MN 23
- Mille Lacs County Road 1
- Mille Lacs County Road 110

== Demographics ==
Historical population
Census	Pop.	Note	%±
1930	109		—
1940	125		14.7%
1950	96		−23.2%
1960	91		−5.2%
1970	105		15.4%
1980	105		0.0%
1990	115		9.5%
2000	106		−7.8%
2010	106		0.0%
2020	78		−26.4%
U.S. Decennial Census

=== 2010 census ===
As of the census of 2010, there were 106 people, 46 households, and 28 families residing in the city. The population density was 706.7 inhabitants per square mile (272.9/km^{2}). There were 49 housing units at an average density of 326.7 per square mile (126.1/km^{2}). The racial makeup of the city was 96.2% White, 1.9% Asian, 0.9% from other races, and 0.9% from two or more races. Hispanic or Latino of any race were 1.9% of the population.

There were 46 households, of which 28.3% had children under the age of 18 living with them, 43.5% were married couples living together, 10.9% had a female householder with no husband present, 6.5% had a male householder with no wife present, and 39.1% were non-families. 30.4% of all households were made up of individuals, and 10.8% had someone living alone who was 65 years of age or older. The average household size was 2.30 and the average family size was 2.75.

The median age in the city was 44.3 years. 21.7% of residents were under the age of 18; 10.4% were between the ages of 18 and 24; 19.8% were from 25 to 44; 38.6% were from 45 to 64; and 9.4% were 65 years of age or older. The gender makeup of the city was 52.8% male and 47.2% female.

=== 2000 census ===
As of the census of 2000, there were 106 people, 46 households, and 31 families residing in the city. The population density was 806.2 inhabitants per square mile (311.3/km^{2}). There were 48 housing units at an average density of 365.1 per square mile (141.0/km^{2}). The racial makeup of the city was 99.06% White, 0.94% from other races. Hispanic or Latino of any race were 2.83% of the population.

There were 46 households, out of which 23.9% had children under the age of 18 living with them, 50.0% were married couples living together, 8.7% had a female householder with no husband present, and 32.6% were non-families. 28.3% of all households were made up of individuals, and 13.0% had someone living alone who was 65 years of age or older. The average household size was 2.22 and the average family size was 2.68.

In the city, the population was spread out, with 17.9% under the age of 18, 10.4% from 18 to 24, 25.5% from 25 to 44, 28.3% from 45 to 64, and 17.9% who were 65 years of age or older. The median age was 44 years. For every 100 females, there were 125.5 males. For every 100 females age 18 and over, there were 117.5 males.

The median income for a household in the city was $31,250, and the median income for a family was $38,750. Males had a median income of $41,250 versus $21,250 for females. The per capita income for the city was $14,806. There were 6.1% of families and 9.3% of the population living below the poverty line, including 21.1% of under eighteens and 13.0% of those over 64.
