= Aberdeen, Texas =

Unincorporated community in Texas, US

Coordinates: 35°02′16″N 100°08′57″W

Aberdeen is an unincorporated community in Collingsworth County, Texas, United States.

== History ==
A post office was established at Aberdeen in 1889, and remained in operation until 1942. The community was named for the Earl of Aberdeen.
