= Tyrrell, Ohio =

Unincorporated community in Ohio, U.S.

Coordinates: 41°16′20″N 80°38′10″W

Tyrrell is an unincorporated community in Trumbull County, in the U.S. state of Ohio.

== History ==
The community was named for Elijah and Ebijah Tyrell, pioneer settlers. A variant name was Tyrell Hill. A post office called Tyrrell Hill was established in 1878, the name was changed to Tyrrell in 1894, and the post office closed in 1930.
