= Mille Lacs =

Mille Lacs may refer to:

== Places ==
- Mille Lacs County, Minnesota, United States
- Lac des Mille Lacs, a lake in Ontario, Canada
- Mille Lacs Lake, a lake in Minnesota, United States
- Mille Lacs Kathio State Park in Minnesota, United States
- Mille Lacs National Wildlife Refuge in Minnesota, United States

== Native American ==
- Mille Lacs Indian Reservation is an Indian Reservation in Minnesota, United States
- Mille Lacs Band of Ojibwe
- Mille Lacs Indian Museum
- Mille Lacs Indian Reservation
- Mille Lacs Indians
- Mille Lacs dialect of the Ojibwe language: see Ojibwe dialects#In regionally specific dictionaries

== Other uses ==
- Mille Lacs County Courthouse
