= National Register of Historic Places listings in Mille Lacs County, Minnesota =

Location of Mille Lacs County in Minnesota

This is a list of the National Register of Historic Places listings in Mille Lacs County, Minnesota.

This is intended to be a complete list of the properties and districts on the National Register of Historic Places in Mille Lacs County, Minnesota, United States. The locations of National Register properties and districts for which the latitude and longitude coordinates are included below, may be seen in an online map.

There are 12 properties and districts listed on the National Register in the county, including one National Historic Landmark. Another property was once listed but has been removed.

This National Park Service list is complete through NPS recent listings posted April 24, 2026.

== Current listings ==
	Name on the Register	Image	Date listed	Location	City or town	Description
1	Bridge No. 3355-Kathio Township	Bridge No. 3355-Kathio Township	June 29, 1998 (#98000685)	U.S. Route 169 over Whitefish Creek; 46°12′55″N 93°47′34″W	Kathio Township	One of Minnesota's few ornamental concrete slab bridges, covered in fine masonry by the Civilian Conservation Corps in 1939.
2	Cooper Site	Cooper Site	September 22, 1970 (#70000299)	West-central shore of Lake Ogechie, Mille Lacs Kathio State Park; 46°08′43″N 93°46′31″W	Onamia vicinity	Precontact and early contact-era Mdewakanton habitation site and burial mounds; the type site for a particular cultural complex and a contributing property to the Kathio Site.
3	Robert C. Dunn House	Robert C. Dunn House	August 29, 1985 (#85001922)	708 S. 4th St. 45°33′58″N 93°35′04″W	Princeton	1902 Colonial Revival house of Robert C. Dunn (1855–1918), a newspaper publisher, local and state politician, and leading advocate for the Good Roads Movement.
4	Ephraim C. Gile House	Ephraim C. Gile House	August 29, 1985 (#85001907)	311 8th Ave. S. 45°33′57″N 93°35′06″W	Princeton	Gothic Revival house built circa 1872, a rare example of the style north of Minneapolis–Saint Paul.
5	Great Northern Depot	Great Northern Depot	November 23, 1977 (#77000757)	101 S 10th St. 45°34′09″N 93°35′17″W	Princeton	1902 train station that served as the area's key hub of commercial shipping for 70 years. Now a museum.
6	Kathio Site	Kathio Site	October 15, 1966 (#66000403)	Within Mille Lacs Kathio State Park; 46°07′45″N 93°45′15″W	Vineland vicinity	Concentration of at least 17 archaeological sites in the contact-era homeland of the Dakota people—later taken over by the Ojibwe—with high potential to illuminate the development of the area's pre- and post-contact indigenous cultures. Now Mille Lacs Kathio State Park.
7	Milaca Municipal Hall	Milaca Municipal Hall	September 11, 1985 (#85002201)	145 Central Ave, S. 45°45′15″N 93°39′03″W	Milaca	Exemplary 1936 municipal hall built in fieldstone by the Works Progress Administration, incorporating a circa-1890 fire hall and interior murals by a Federal Art Project painter. Now a local history museum.
8	Mille Lacs County Courthouse	Mille Lacs County Courthouse	March 25, 1977 (#77000756)	635 2nd St. SE; 45°45′15″N 93°38′35″W	Milaca	Seat of county government since 1923 and a well-preserved embodiment of a post-World War I phase in courthouse architecture that favored Renaissance/Classical Revival motifs and fireproof construction to protect public records.
9	Onamia Municipal Hall	Onamia Municipal Hall	September 10, 1985 (#85002333)	621 Main St. 46°04′13″N 93°40′08″W	Onamia	Fieldstone municipal hall built 1935–36, a well-preserved example of typical Works Progress Administration unemployment relief projects using readily available but labor-intensive local materials.
10	Petaga Point	Petaga Point	September 22, 1970 (#70000300)	Outlet of Lake Ogechie, Mille Lacs Kathio State Park; 46°07′50″N 93°46′50″W	Onamia vicinity	3000–1000 BCE habitation site, the oldest within the Kathio Site district.
11	Saw Mill Site	Saw Mill Site	September 22, 1970 (#70000301)	Northwest shore of Lake Ogechie, Mille Lacs Kathio State Park; 46°08′57″N 93°46′44″W	Onamia vicinity	Site of a precontact village in use 400–1600 CE, representing a distinctive cultural phase of native occupation. Also a contributing property to the Kathio Site.
12	Vineland Bay Site	Vineland Bay Site	September 22, 1970 (#70000302)	North shore of Vineland Bay, Mille Lacs Kathio State Park; 46°09′45″N 93°45′22″W	Vineland vicinity	Site of a late precontact-era village circa 800–1100 CE as well as a 19th-century Ojibwe camp, the former being significant as a distinctive cultural phase of native occupation. Also a contributing property to the Kathio Site.

== Former listing ==
	Name on the Register	Image	Date listed	Date removed	Location	City or town	Description
1	Ellen Ruth (launch)	Ellen Ruth (launch)	August 29, 1985 (#85001923)	June 21, 1990	Main St. between Lake Shore Boulevard and Fifth St. (original address); Current coordinates are 46°07′05″N 93°31′15″W	Wahkon	Fishing boat brought in 1933 to serve an early lake resort. Relocated in 1989.

== See also ==
- List of National Historic Landmarks in Minnesota
- National Register of Historic Places listings in Minnesota
