= Battle of Kathio =

1750 battle

Coordinates: 46.166651°N 93.758902°W

- Part of Dakota-Ojibwe War
Date	1750
Location	Rum River/Mille Lacs Lake
Result	Ojibwe victory; Sioux expelled from Mille Lacs and northeastern MN
Territorial changes	Minnesota, United States

Belligerents
Ojibwe	Mdewakanton Dakota

The Battle of Kathio, or Battle of Izatys, is an oral tradition of the Ojibwe reporting a battle fought in 1750. It was fought between the Ojibwe (also known as the Chippewa) and the Dakota at the village of Kathio, also called Izatys, near the source of the Rum River, Mille Lacs Lake. If historical, it would be a battle in the Dakota-Ojibwe War.

== Story of the Battle ==
According to tradition, an old man living in an Ojibwe village at Fond du Lac, in modern-day Duluth, had four adult sons. They frequently made trips to visit the Dakota and they often returned home with gifts. During one particular trip one of the sons was killed in a quarrel over a Dakota woman. The remaining three brothers returned home for a short while, then returned to the Dakota, convinced the death of their brother was a mistake. However, upon this trip, only one brother returned home to his father safely. The last son, filled with forgiveness, went to seek the Dakota and reconcile their differences, but only met his death in the Dakota village.

For two years after, the father hunted and worked hard to obtain enough ammunition and supplies to raid the Dakota village and seek his revenge. As was the custom, he sent his tobacco and war club to the other Ojibwe villages asking for help to accompany him "in search of his sons". The response was overwhelming and a large war party assembled at Fond du Lac. The Ojibwe were victorious, and gained control of the northern part of what became modern day Minnesota as a result.

== Historicity ==
To date no archaeological evidence has been found to support the historical validity of this story, although French explorer Daniel Greysolon, Sieur du Lhut did, in 1679, record the existence of 40 Sioux villages in the vicinity.

The last vestige of Sioux domination in this area was broken with the destruction, in about the year 1750, of the great Sioux village of Kathio on the Rum River, near the present village of Vineland.

This is a historically known Battle at Mille Lacs that occurred in 1745, possibly a precursor to this battle.

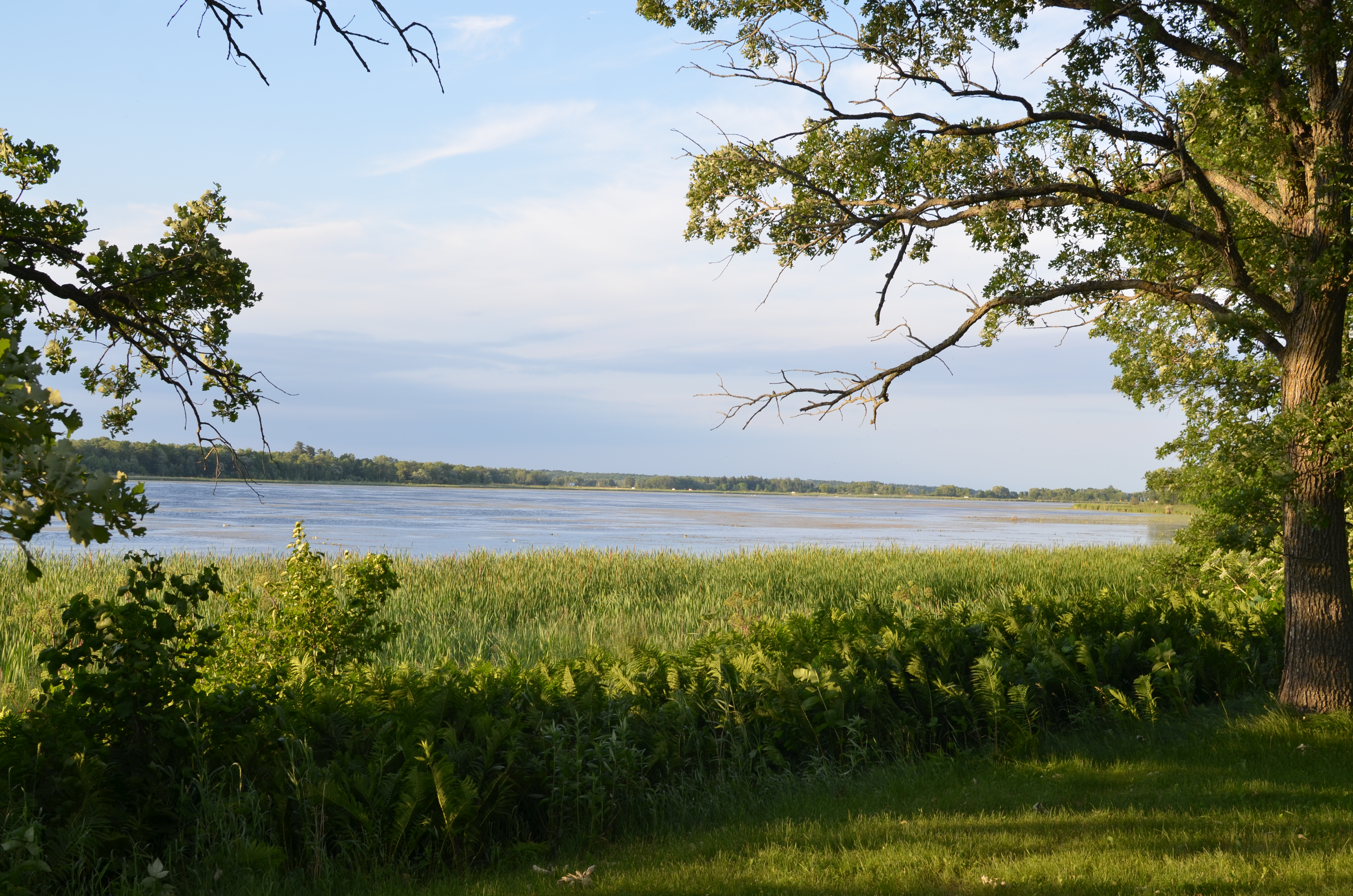
View from Izatys habitation site.

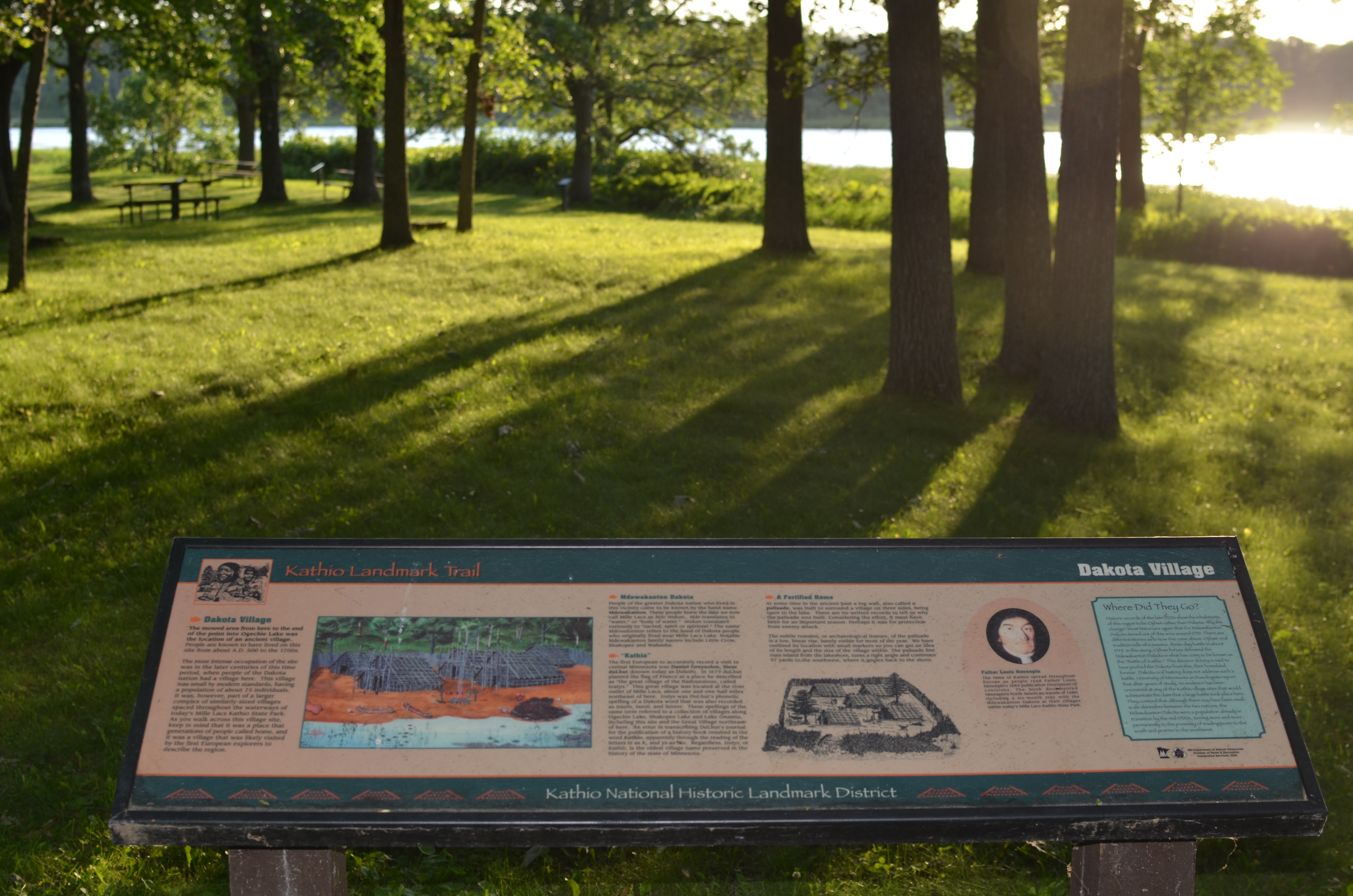
Izatys habitation site.

== See also ==
- Mille Lacs Kathio State Park
