= Onamia Public Schools =

School district in Minnesota, United States

Onamia Public Schools (Independent School District #480) is a school district headquartered in Onamia, Minnesota.

In Mille Lacs County it serves Onamia and Vineland, and in Morrison County it serves Hillman. It also serves sections of Crow Wing County.

== History ==
Prior to 1979 the Mille Lacs Indian Reservation did not have a tribal school, so Native American students generally attended Onamia Public Schools. Tom Callinan of the Daily Times of St. Cloud, Minnesota stated that in that period the Native American dropout rate was 66% and there was prejudice against Natives in the school system. Native students did a walkout in 1975 which resulted in an arrangement where Natives spent half of the day in Onamia and the other half doing cultural classes on the reservation, but they moved to establish their own school, Nay Ah Shing School, circa 1979 after the time of the latter decreased. John Liapis became the Onamia superintendent in 1978. In 1983 the school system had five Native American students.

== Schools ==
- Onamia High School
- Onamia Intermediate School
- Onamia Primary School
