= Rum River State Forest =

State Forest in Kanabec, Mille Lacs and Morrison counties, Minnesota

- Location within Minnesota
- Interactive map of Rum River State Forest

Geography
- Location: Kanabec, Mille Lacs, and Morrison counties, Minnesota, United States
- Coordinates: 45°54′27″N 93°35′59″W
- Elevation: 1,263 feet (385 m)
- Area: 40,605 acres (16,432 ha)

Administration
- Established: 1935
- Authority: Minnesota Department of Natural Resources
- Website: www.dnr.state.mn.us/state_forests/forest.html?id=sft00043#homepage

The Rum River State Forest is a state forest located in Kanabec, Mille Lacs and Morrison counties in central Minnesota. The forest is nearby the city of Onamia and is along the Rum River, just downstream (south) of Mille Lacs Lake. The forest is managed by the Minnesota Department of Natural Resources. The forest is home to many Northern hardwoods such as maple, oak, ash, elm and basswood that occupy most of the upland areas while tamarack and black spruce are found in lowland and marshy areas.

== History ==
The original landscape consisted of predominantly virgin white pine, red oak, and white oak. Much of the original forest was cut down for timber and floated down the Rum River and Ann River to sawmills downstream. Following the deforestation of the area, farms were established along the Rum River area. However, many of these farms failed in the 1930s and were abandoned. In 1935, the Minnesota Legislature established both the Rum River and Mille Lacs State Forest. In 1963, both of these forests were combined into the Rum River State Forest.

== Recreation ==
Popular outdoor recreational activities in the forest include dispersed camping. Trails are designated for such varied uses such as mountain biking and hiking. In the wintertime, trails are designated for cross-country skiing and snowmobiling. Mille Lacs Lake is located just north of the forest. Along the northern boundary of the forest is Mille Lacs Kathio State Park which contains 19 identified archaeological sites, making it one of the most significant archaeological collections in Minnesota.

== See also ==
- List of Minnesota state forests
- Rum River
- Mille Lacs Lake
- Mille Lacs Kathio State Park
