= Nay Ah Shing School =

Tribal school system in Minnesota

Coordinates: 46.1815°N 93.7509°W

Nay Ah Shing School, also known as Mille Lacs Band K-12 Schools, is a K-12 tribal school system headquartered in unincorporated Mille Lacs County, Minnesota, with an Onamia postal address. It is affiliated with the Bureau of Indian Education (BIE). It is on the Mille Lacs Indian Reservation.

The divisions include (all of which are in unincorporated areas):

- Nay Ah Shing School (Mille Lacs County, Onamia address) (grades 6–12)
- Abinoojiiyag School (Mille Lacs County, Onamia address) (grades K-5)
- Pine Grove Learning Center (Pine County, Sandstone address) (grades K-5)

The name "Nay Ah Shing" means "on the point".

== History ==
It was established circa 1979 after Native American students had perceived issues with Onamia Public Schools, which previously experienced high dropout rates from Native students. After a March 1975 walkout there was a deal to have Native students spend about half of each school day in Onamia with cultural classes on the reservation taking the remainder, but the time of the latter had decreased. After the Bureau of Indian Affairs (BIA) gave the tribe a $138,000 yearly budget for educational purposes in September 1979, the school opened. The initial enrollment was 49, and Tom Callinan of the Daily Times reported the number of students staying similar up to February 1983, when it had 47 students.

Pat Phelpher of the Minneapolis Star-Tribune wrote that the tribe's chief executive, Arthur Gahbow, "was instrumental in starting the Nay Ah Shing School". In 2001 the enrollment was 110. That year a mural was established on the school grounds honoring the tribe, with every student having a chance to add to the mural.

== Curriculum ==
As of 2014 the school aligns its curriculum with that of the State of Minnesota, and it also has Ojibwe cultural components, including instruction on the culture and the language. As of that year the school was trying to re-introduce the language in the student body, as previous groups of Ojibwe were not permitted to use the language in previous Native American boarding schools; Rutter et al. (employees of the school) described the Nay Ah Shing School's re-introduction efforts as "concerted".

In 1983 the school had different classes in mornings and afternoons, with core classes in the former and elective courses in the latter.

As of 1996 it uses Ojibwe immersion as the method to teach the language.

== Campuses ==
The main campus is in proximity to the History and Museum Trading Post and the Milles Lacs Band Government Center.

Rutter et. al describe the institution as "very small".

== Student body ==
In 1983, of the 47 students, five were deemed to be at risk for dropping out, a rate lower than that for Native Americans at the time. In 1983, when the school had a single campus, most of the students lived within walking distance, with school buses serving the remainder.

Circa 2014, the number of students was around 200. Rutter et al. described that number as "very small".

Circa 2014, Rutter et al. stated that many students had difficulties coming to class on time or at all, often due to socioeconomic difficulties.

Rutter et al. also reported that there is a cultural viewpoint in the Ojibwe about how time is allocated and flexibility in time that differs from the viewpoint of teachers not of indigenous United States backgrounds. The authors referred to "Indian Time", which is not always about lateness, but about flexibility and aligning with patterns in nature instead of strictly with set times.

== Staff ==
In 1983 the school had two Native American teachers and two non-Native American teachers.

Rutter et al. stated that due to the school's size, teachers have a larger opportunity to shape the management and education style at the school.

The area around the school does not have a pool of substitute teachers compared to most American schools, so staff make alternate arrangements if a teacher is absent.

== Extracurricular activities ==
As of 2014 the school did not have a range of arts or athletics that would be present in a larger, urban school.
