= Father Hennepin State Park =

State park in Minnesota, United States

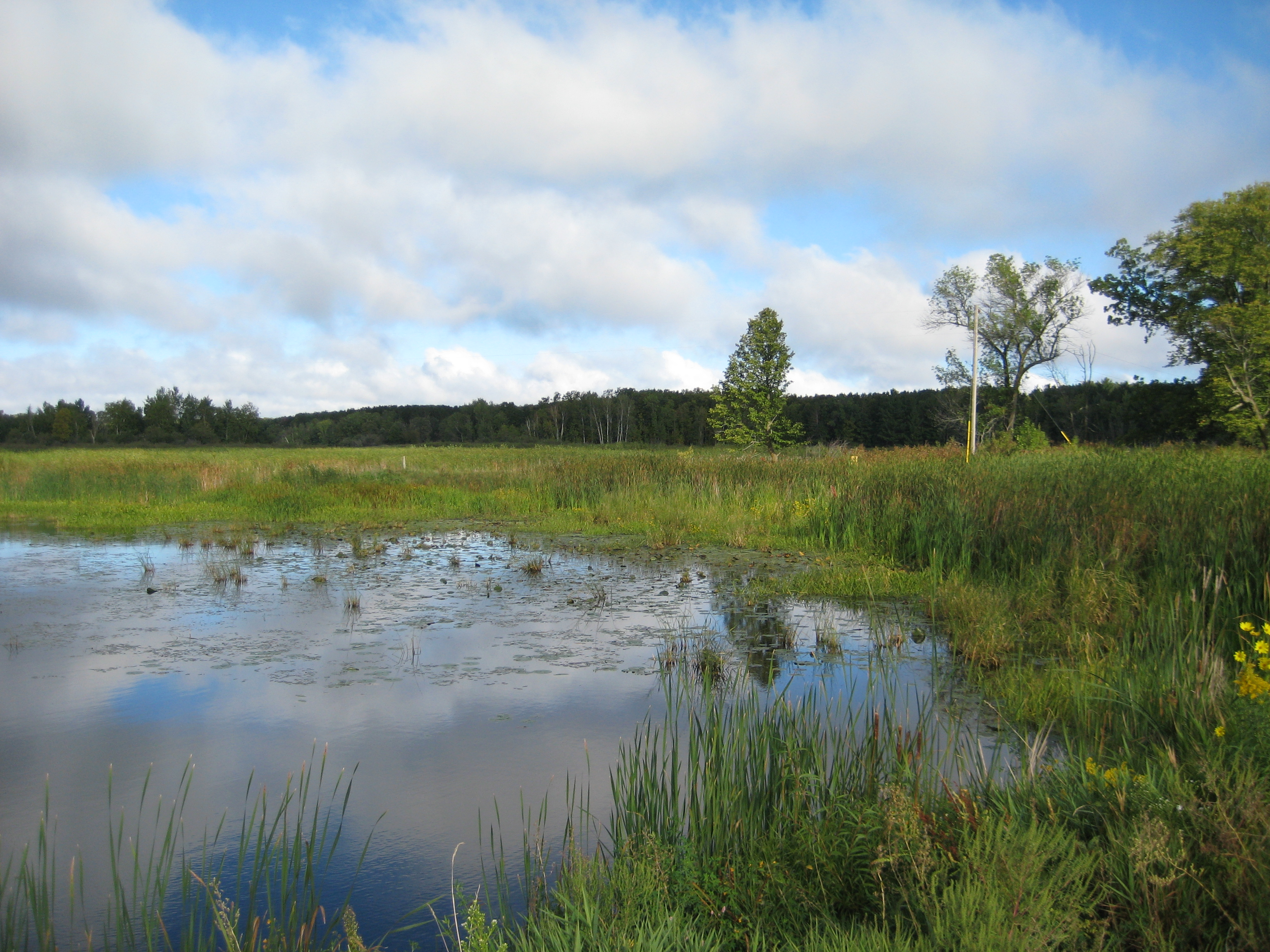
- Marsh off of Mille Lacs Lake

- Location within Minnesota Location within the United States
- Location: Mille Lacs, Minnesota, United States
- Coordinates: 46°8′41″N 93°29′17″W
- Area: 320 acres (130 ha)
- Elevation: 1,276 ft (389 m)
- Established: 1941
- Named for: Louis Hennepin
- Governing body: Minnesota Department of Natural Resources

Father Hennepin State Park is a state park of Minnesota, USA, located on the southeast corner of Mille Lacs Lake. The park is named after Father Louis Hennepin, a priest who visited the area with a French expedition in 1680. The 320-acre (130 ha) park has 103 campsites and a sandy beach over one mile (1.6 km) long.

== Wildlife ==
Hawks, ospreys, owls, and eagles are common raptors found in this park. Mammalian tracks of beaver, raccoon, mink and deer are often seen by visitors in the soft earth or snow. Northern pike, walleye, bluegills, sunfish and bass swim around this park's lake. The aspen stands and small clearings are set up for ruffed grouse. Squirrels and chipmunks thrive in maple and oak stands. The small ponds and streams provide homes for amphibians and insects, which in turn attract larger fish, birds and mammals.

== Cultural history ==
Father Louis Hennepin, a Franciscan priest of the Recollet order, was dispatched to explore western New France in 1680. Hennepin is not thought to have been in the exact location of the park, but the park is named after him because he was the first to write extensively about the Mille Lacs area. He called the area Louisiana in honor of King Louis XIV. In the spring of 1680 he and two companions encountered a group of Dakota Native Americans and were captured, about 15 miles (24 km) from today's Father Hennepin State Park. Their release was negotiated eight months later by Daniel Greysolon, Sieur du Lhut. Throughout the experience, Father Hennepin kept a journal describing the lakes, rivers, landscapes, and the lifestyle of his hosts, the Mdewakanton Dakota. In 1683 his writings were published in the book Description de la Louisiane.

Local advocates and Catholic groups were instrumental in getting the park established in the years before World War II. The Minnesota Legislature was reluctant to fund a new park, but when 129 acres (52 ha) of tax-forfeited land were acquired at little cost, Father Hennepin State Memorial Park was authorized in 1941. However a provision was inserted into the bill barring any state funds from supporting the park for the first five years. County and local funds only went so far, and the park remained largely undeveloped until 1953 when the Minnesota state park system instituted an entrance fee.
