= Mille Lacs National Wildlife Refuge =

National wildlife refuge in Minnesota, United States

- IUCN category IV (habitat/species management area)
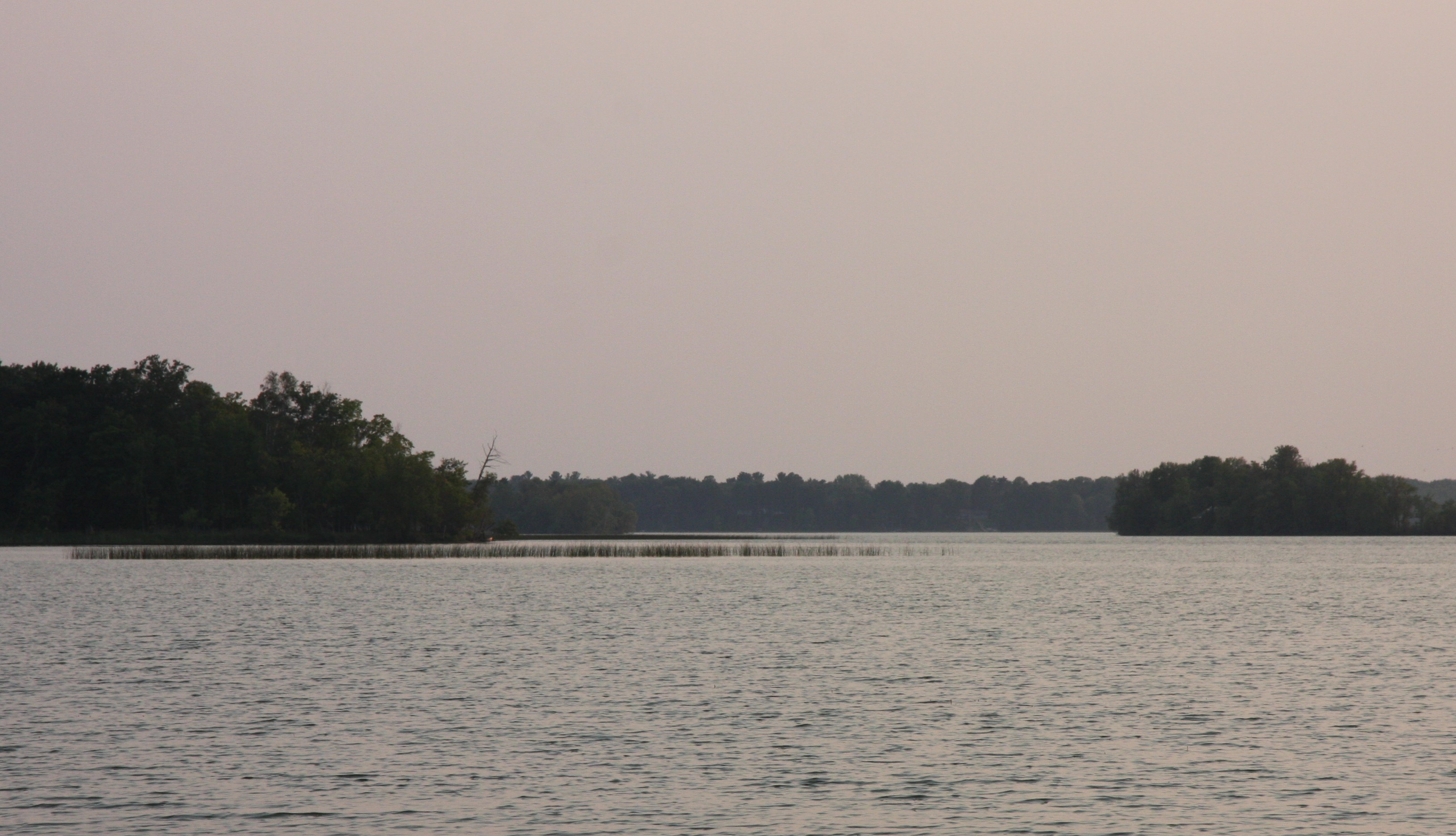
- Mille Lacs National Wildlife Refuge in 2015

- Location within the United States
- Location: South Harbor Township, Mille Lacs County, Minnesota
- Nearest city: Wahkon, Minnesota
- Coordinates: 46°9′58″N 93°34′36″W
- Area: 0.57 acres (2,300 m^{2})
- Established: May 14, 1915
- Governing body: U.S. Fish and Wildlife Service
- Website: Mille Lacs National Wildlife Refuge

Mille Lacs National Wildlife Refuge is a 0.57 acre (2,300 m^{2}) National Wildlife Refuge in central Minnesota. The refuge consists solely of two small islands in Mille Lacs Lake, and is the smallest National Wildlife Refuge in the United States. It was created on May 14, 1915, to preserve breeding habitat for several bird species. The islands are one of only four breeding colonies of common terns, a threatened species in Minnesota. Other native species breeding within the refuge include ring-billed and herring gulls and double-crested cormorants.

The islands can only be reached by boat. Landing on them is officially discouraged (though not forbidden), and instead visitors are asked to conduct their birdwatching from watercraft.

Mille Lacs National Wildlife Refuge is administered from Rice Lake National Wildlife Refuge.
