= Mille Lacs Indian Reservation =

Land-base for the Mille Lacs Band of Ojibwe in Central Minnesota

Mille Lacs Indian Reservation is the popular name for the land-base for the Mille Lacs Band of Ojibwe in Central Minnesota, about 100 miles (160 km) north of Minneapolis-St. Paul. The contemporary Mille Lacs Band reservation has significant land holdings in Mille Lacs, Pine, Aitkin and Crow Wing counties, as well as other land holdings in Kanabec, Morrison, and Otter Tail Counties. Mille Lacs Indian Reservation is also the name of a formal Indian reservation established in 1855. It is one of the two formal reservations on which the contemporary Mille Lacs Band retains land holdings. The contemporary Mille Lacs band includes several aboriginal Ojibwe bands and villages, whose members reside in communities throughout central Minnesota.

== Reservations ==
=== Mille Lacs Lake Indian Reservation ===
Location of Mille Lacs Lake Indian Reservation

The main reservation of the Mille Lacs Indian Reservation is the Mille Lacs Lake Indian Reservation (Misi-zaaga'iganiing in the Ojibwe language), at 46°06′26″N 93°42′58″W, and commonly referred to as the "Mille Lacs Indian Reservation", at the southern end of Mille Lacs Lake and composes about 60,975 acres (246.76 km^{2}) of land (commonly rounded in citations as "61,000 acres"), consisting of Township 42 North, Ranges 25, 26 and 27 West, and Township 43 North, Range 27 West, and islands in the southern part of Mille Lacs Lake. Before the raising of the lake level, United States v. Mille Lac Band of Chippewa Indians (229 U.S. 498 (1913)) cites the reservation as being 61,014 acres (246.91 km^{2}) of land. It was initially established in 1855 under the Treaty of Washington (10 Stat. 1165) for the Mille Lacs Indians and other Mississippi Chippewa (Ojibwe) Bands of Indians, but was later ceded back to the U.S. Government under later treaties. Under later treaties and statutes the reservation was reserved for the exclusive occupancy of the Mille Lacs Band, and was later opened to non-Indian timber harvesting and settlement following the protocol of the General Allotment Act. The US Census Bureau designates this reservation as part of "2270: Mille Lacs Indian Reservation and Off-Reservation Trust Land".

This reservation contains the communities of Neyaashiing (Vineland) and Chi-minising (Isle). Neyaashiing houses the Mille Lacs Band of Ojibwe Government Center, Nay-Ah-Shing Lower and Upper Schools and the Ne-Ia-Shing Clinic. It hosts Minnesota Historical Society's Mille Lacs Indian Museum. Grand Casino Mille Lacs is also located in Neyaashiing. The central offices for Woodland National Bank, which is owned by the Mille Lacs Band, and the offices of the Band's Circle of Health supplementary Health Insurance, are both located in Onamia, Minnesota, within the Mille Lacs Indian Reservation. Chi-minising houses the Chiminising Community Center and District IIa Government Services Center.

The reservation is located in Kathio Township, South Harbor Township, and Isle Harbor Township in Mille Lacs County. Other lands held in trust by the United States on behalf of the Mille Lacs Band of Ojibwe are contiguous to the Mille Lacs Indian Reservation in southwest corner of Idun Township in Aitkin County.

In March 2022, the United States District Court for the District of Minnesota reaffirmed that the territory set aside in the Treaty of 1855 still has federal reservation status, ruling in favor of the Mille Lacs Band of Ojibwe in a boundary dispute with Mille Lacs County.

=== Sandy Lake Indian Reservation ===
The contemporary Mille Lacs Indian Band also has land holdings with the Sandy Lake Indian Reservation (Gaa-mitaawangaagamaag in the Ojibwe language) 46°48′09″N 93°14′59″W in Aitkin County, which surrounds Big Sandy Lake and comprises about 20,192 acres (81.71 km^{2}) of land. Like Misi-zaaga'iganiing, it too was initially established in 1855 under the Treaty of Washington for the Mississippi Bands of Chippewa Indians. Under a later treaty it was reserved for the exclusive occupancy of the Sandy Lake Band, and it was later opened to non-Indian settlement. The US Census Bureau designates this reservation as "2385: Sandy Lake Indian Reservation".

Today, nearly all of the land within this reservation is non-Native American owned. The Gaa-mitaawangaagamaag community of the historical Sandy Lake Band of Mississippi Chippewa is located adjacent to and within the northern portion of the reservation. The Chi-manoominikaang community of the historical Rice Lake band of Mississippi Chippewa is located adjacent to the reservation on the southern portion of the reservation. The United States Army Corps of Engineers operate a small flood-control dam within this Indian Reservation.

The reservation is located in parts of Libby, Shamrock, Turner, and Workman Townships in Aitkin County.

=== Other reservation holdings ===
Aggregated as part of the US Census Bureau designated "2270: Mille Lacs Indian Reservation and Off-Reservation Trust Land", Mille Lacs Indian Reservation have scattered trust parcels less than 80 acres (32 ha) each in Pine, Kanabec, southern Aitkin, Crow Wing and Morrison Counties, Minnesota. In addition, Mille Lacs Indian Reservation maintains the land upkeep on the Minnesota Chippewa Tribe ricing parcel at Star Lake. Furthermore, each Minnesota Chippewa Tribe member reservation, including the Mille Lacs Indian Reservation, hold equal one-sixth (^{1}/_{6}) interest on all Minnesota Chippewa Tribe member reservations, though asserting jurisdiction only on their own reservation.

== Districts ==
Due to the large territorial spread of the contemporary Mille Lacs Band of Ojibwe, the Mille Lacs Band's statutes divide its territory into three administrative districts and one special services district.

=== District I ===
The Neyaashiing District (District I) serves the Band members living in the western two-thirds of the Misi-zaaga'iganiing and 30-mile (48 km) service area from that portion of the reservation. In addition, any requested services outside of the pre-defined service districts are coordinated though this district. Its administrative center is located in Neyaashiing Community (Vineland, Minnesota), a Census-designated community located approximately 10 miles (16 km) north of Onamia, Minnesota.

=== District II ===
Gaa-mitaawangaagamaag District (District II) serves the Band members living in the eastern one-third of the Misi-zaaga'iganiing Reservation, all of Gaa-mitaawangaagamaag Reservation, the Chi-manoominikaang Community and the Minisinaakwaang Community and 30-mile (48 km) service area from those locations.

This district is further sub-divided into two sub-districts: Districts IIa and IIb. District IIa is associated with the Chi-minising Community (Isle, Minnesota). District IIb comprises the rest of District II. The Minisinaakwaang Community (East Lake, Minnesota) is located approximately 6 miles (9.7 km) south of McGregor, MN. Minisinaakwaang Community houses the Mille Lacs Indian Reservation District II Community and Government Services Center, serving primarily District IIb.

=== District III ===
Aazhoomog District (District III) of the Mille Lacs Indian Reservation is located primarily in Pine County, comprises the Ne-zhingwaakokaag (Pine City-Rock Creek-Pokegama Lake) community of the historical Snake and Knife Rivers Band of the St. Croix Chippewa Indians of Minnesota, Gaa-zhiigwanaabikokaag (Hinckley) and Asiniikaaning (Sandstone) communities of the historical Kettle River Band of St. Croix Chippewa Indians of Minnesota, and the Aazhoomog (Lake Lena) Village of the historical St. Croix Chippewa Indians of Minnesota, and 30-mile (48 km) service area from those locations. Though historically forming the western half of the St. Croix Chippewa Indians, these communities associated with the Mille Lacs band since the 1800s and are a part of today's contemporary Mille Lacs Band of Ojibwe. The contemporary St. Croix Chippewa Indians of Wisconsin, located east of the St. Croix River, is considered a federally recognized tribe, which is not associated with the Mille Lacs Band of Ojibwe, located west of the St. Croix River.

Aazhoomog Village houses the Mille Lacs Indian Reservation District III Community and Government Service Center and the Aazhoomog Clinic of the Ne-Ia-Shing Health Clinic system. Operating out of Gaa-zhiigwanaabikokaag is Grand Casino Hinckley and their various enterprises, including a golf course, RV park and a concert hall.

=== Urban Area ===
The Urban Area of the Mille Lacs Indian Reservation is a special services district serving the large number of Mille Lacs Band of Ojibwe living in the Twin Cities urban area. Originally in the Band's statutes, the urban area was established and defined as being Anoka, Hennepin and Ramsey Counties, providing TANF services to Band members in those three counties. While TANF services are still at the core for services provided to Band members living in the urban area, the Urban Area has grown in providing other tribal supportive services, before available only on the Mille Lacs Indian Reservation proper. With a cooperative agreement with the city of Minneapolis, Minnesota, the Urban Area provides affordable rental housing units to eligible low-income Band members.

== Demographics ==
As of the census of 2020, the combined population of Mille Lacs Reservation and Off-Reservation Trust Land was 4,767. The population density was 48.3 inhabitants per square mile (18.6/km^{2}). There were 3,208 housing units at an average density of 32.5 per square mile (12.5/km^{2}).

The reservation has a significant non-native population due in part to the allotment and sale of Ojibwe lands in the late nineteenth and early twentieth century. In 2020, the racial makeup of the reservation and off-reservation trust land was 60.6% white, 31.8% Native American, 0.3% Asian, 0.3% Black or African American, 0.9% from other races, and 6.2% from two or more races. Ethnically, the population was 2.7% Hispanic or Latino of any race.

== Communities ==
Though only nine communities are cited in the Band's statutes, the Mille Lacs Band of Ojibwe has ten formal communities and additional six informal communities.

Ten formal communities:

- Vineland, Minnesota (Nay-ah-shing [Neyaashiing])
- Isle, Minnesota (Chi-mini-sing [Chi-minising])
- East Lake, Minnesota (Mi-ni-si-na-kwang [Minisinaakwaang])
- Minnewawa, Minnesota (Chi-manoominikaang)
- Sandy Lake, Minnesota (Ga-me-ta-wa-ga-gi-mog [Gaa-mitaawangaagamaag])
- Sandstone, Minnesota (A-sin-ni-ga-ning [Asiniikaaning])
- Lake Lena, Minnesota (Ah-sho-moog [Aazhoomog])
- Hinckley, Minnesota (Ga-shi-gwa-na-bi-go-gog [Gaa-zhiigwanaabikokaag])
- Pine City, Minnesota (Ne-shi-gwa-go-gog [Ne-zhingwaakokaag])
- The Twin Cities (Gichi-oodenaang)

Six informal communities:

- Brainerd, Minnesota (Oshki-oodenaang)
- Onamia, Minnesota (Gibaakwa'igaansing)
- Cove, Minnesota (Wiikwegamaang)
- Wahkon, Minnesota (Zaagawaamikaag-wiidwedong)
- Moose Lake, Minnesota (Mooz-eskani-zaaga'iganiing)
- Duluth, Minnesota (Onigamiinsing)

== Education ==
The tribal school is Nay Ah Shing School, with the Abinoojiiyag School (Nay Ah Shing Lower School) and Nay Ah Shing Upper School at the Vineland Campus, and Pine Grove Academy at the Lake Lena Campus. For the 2024-2025 school year, there were 125 students enrolled and 63 staff employed.

In East Lake, the tribe operated Minisinaakwaang Leadership Academy, a Minnesota charter school. It closed at the end of the 2020-2021 school year.

A significant number of tribe's children also attend public schools in communities in and around the reservation.

== See also ==
- Minnesota Indian Affairs Council
- Aaniin Ekidong: Ojibwe Vocabulary Project. St. Paul: Minnesota Humanities Center, 2009.
- Treuer, Anton. Ojibwe in Minnesota. St. Paul: Minnesota Historical Society Press, 2010.
- Treuer, Anton. Living Our Language: Ojibwe Tales & Oral Histories. St. Paul: Minnesota Historical Society Press, 2001.
