= Rum River =

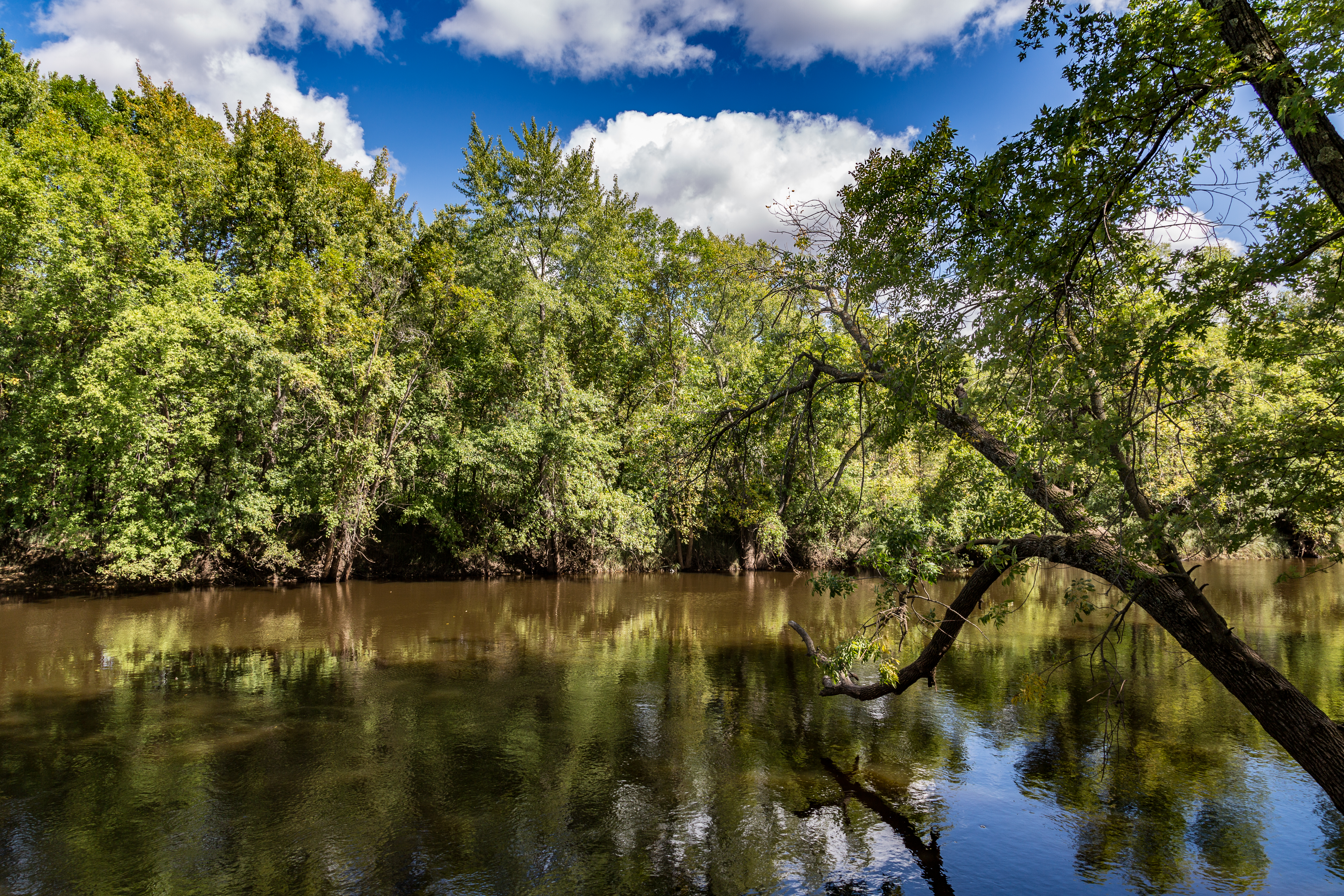
- Rum River in Princeton, Minnesota

- Rum River highlighted

- Mouth of the Rum River
- Etymology: Mistranslation of Watpa waḳaŋ
- Native name: Watpa waḳaŋ (Dakota); Misi-zaaga'igani-ziibi (Ojibwe)

Location
- Country: United States
- State: Minnesota
- Counties: Anoka, Isanti, Sherburne, Mille Lacs

Physical characteristics
- Source: Mille Lacs Lake
  - location: Mille Lacs Indian Reservation
  - coordinates: 46.160499°N 93.756020°W
- Mouth: Mississippi River
  - location: Anoka, Anoka County, MN
  - coordinates: 45.189985°N 93.390311°W
- Length: 151 miles (243 km)
- Discharge
  - location: St. Francis, MN
  - average: 683 cu ft/s (19.3 m^{3}/s).

The Rum River is a slow, meandering stream that connects Minnesota's Mille Lacs Lake with the Mississippi River. It runs for 151 miles (243 km) through the communities of Onamia, Milaca, Princeton, Cambridge, Isanti, and St. Francis before ending at the city of Anoka, roughly 20 miles northwest of Minneapolis. It is one of the six protected Wild and Scenic rivers in Minnesota.

== History ==
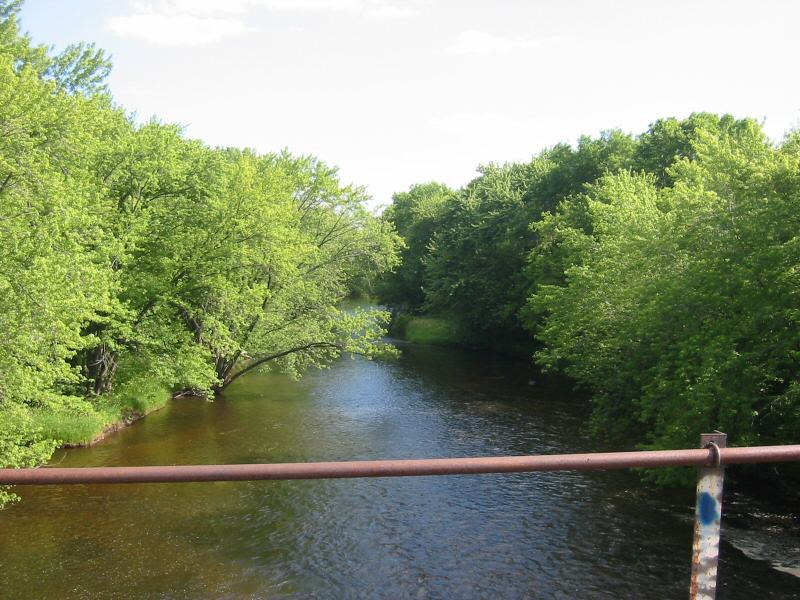
The Rum River as seen on the west side of Milaca, Minnesota.

The early explorer Louis Hennepin is credited with being the first European to lay eyes upon the Rum. He was taken to see it during the spring of 1680, while under the captivity of a party of Dakota. He referred to it as the St. Francis river in his published journals, although obviously the name didn't stick. The current river bearing the name St. Francis River, located 12 miles west of the Rum, parallels the flow of the Rum.

The Rum River makes a sharp turn southward at Cambridge, Minnesota. During the spring floods, the Rum River forces itself through a wetland complex west of Cambridge as the sharp bend constricts the river's floodwaters. In the 1825 First Treaty of Prairie du Chien, the outlet of this natural diversion channel located near Isanti, Minnesota, known as "Choking Creek", became a treaty boundary separating the Dakota from the Ojibwe.

In Princeton, Minnesota, the Rum divides between the Main Branch and the West Branch. When Mille Lacs County, Minnesota was created from Benton County, Minnesota, the West Branch of the Rum served as the counties' boundary. Today, Mille Lacs County's western boundary instead follows the public land survey line.

The Bogus Brook, which flows into the Rum River, was known to have been a refuge for moonshiners during Prohibition.

== Name history ==
The Dakota name for the river is Watpa waḳaŋ (Spirit(ual)/Mystic River), after Mille Lacs Lake (Mde waḳaŋ, Spirit(ual)/Mystic Lake). In 1702, d'Isle's map recorded the name of the river as Riviere des Mendeoüacanton (River of the Mdewakanton). On the "Carte représentant le Messisipi entre le 49e d. et le 42e d. ou aboutit la rivière Wisconsing lac Supérieure, lac des Illinois et lac Alemepigon" map (c. 1730), Rum River is recorded as Rivière de S. François ou des Nadouessioux (St. Francis or Sioux River). On the 1733 Henry Popple map, the Rum River is shown as R. Nendivaocanton. Upham notes that both Carver in 1766 and Pike in 1805 found the name "Rum River" in use by English-speaking fur traders. However, the 1778 Mitchell Map by John Mitchell records the river as Fiume del Lago (River of the Lake), with Samuel Mitchell reproducing the map in 1880, with the river recorded as Lake R.; Mille Lacs Lake, though, was recorded in the reproduction as Red Lake or Mustiacalsan ("Mustiacalsan" being a mis-recording of "Miſsiſacaigon"). Henry Schoolcraft in his Narratives in 1820 records the Rum River by its Ojibwe name Missisawgaiegon. By 1832, Tanner's map recorded the name of the river as Missisagaigon or Rum River. Today, two different Ojibwe names can be found for this river: one indicating the lake of its origin (Misi-zaaga'igani-ziibi, Grand Lake River) and the other reflecting the English (Ishkodewaaboo-ziibi, Fire-water River). Due to changes in the Dakota language, two slightly varying river's name appears as well: Watpa waḳaŋ representing the historically recorded name, and Wakpa waḳaŋ reflecting the current name.

== Naming controversy ==
The current English name is a mistranslation of the one given to it by the Mdewakanton Dakota (see Dakota) tribe. Though Watpa waḳaŋ (Spirit(ual)/Mystic River) in the Dakota language, by the late 18th-century Europeans interpreted the Mdewakanton Dakota name for the river not as "Spirit" denoting a mystical force, but instead as "spirit" denoting alcohol and ever since it has been known as the Rum River.

== See also ==
- Mille Lacs Kathio State Park
- Rum River State Forest
- List of Minnesota rivers
- List of longest streams of Minnesota
