= Mille Lacs Kathio State Park =

Coordinates: 46.128849°N 93.740527°W

- Kathio Site
- U.S. National Register of Historic Places
- U.S. National Historic Landmark District
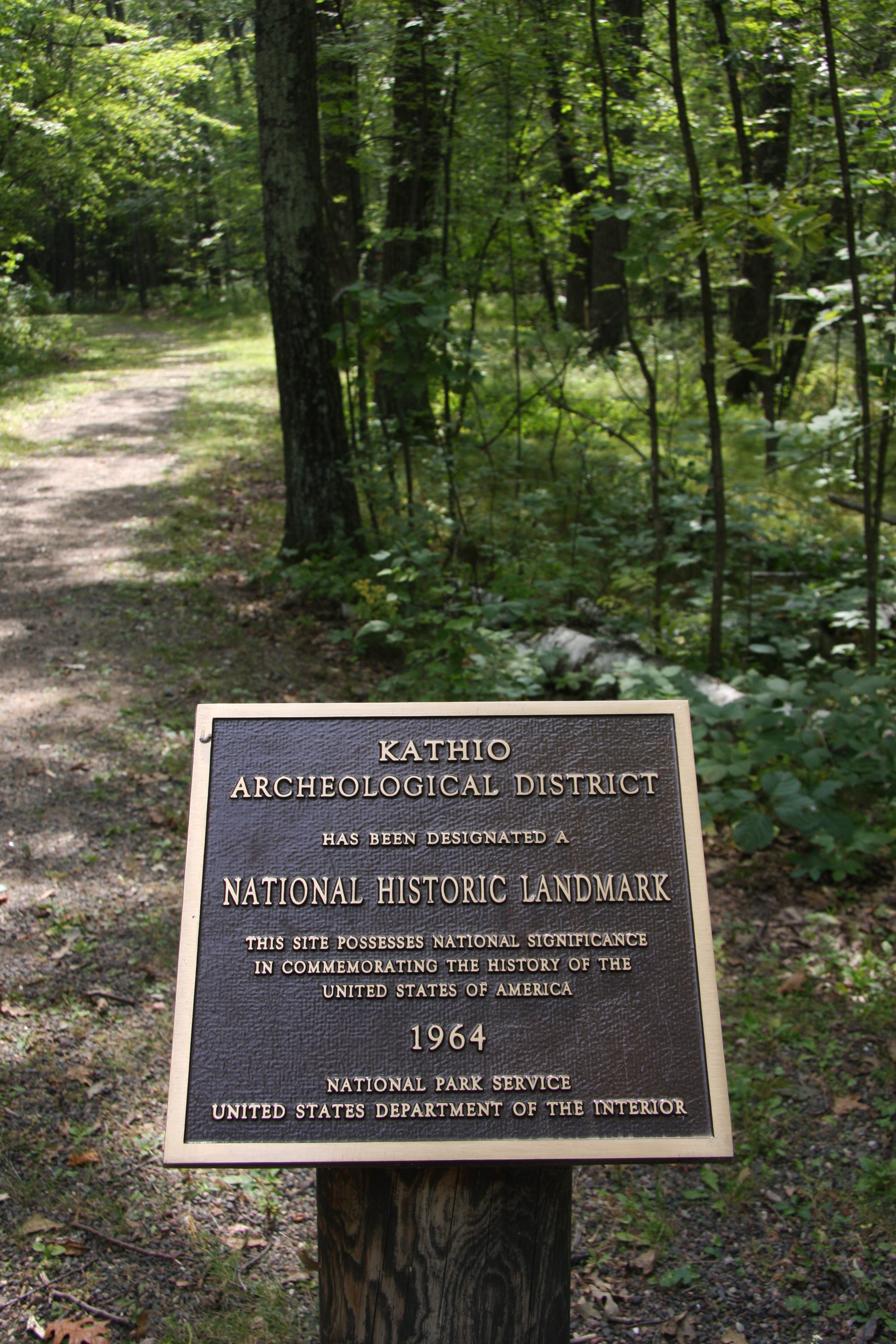
- Kathio Archeological District

- Location within Minnesota Location within the United States
- Location: Mille Lacs County, Minnesota
- Nearest city: Vineland, Minnesota
- NRHP reference No.: 66000403

Significant dates
- Added to NRHP: October 15, 1966
- Designated NHLD: July 19, 1964

Mille Lacs Kathio State Park, also known as Kathio Site, is a Minnesota state park on Mille Lacs Lake. The park preserves habitation sites and mound groups, believed to date between 3000 BC and 1750 AD, that document Dakota Indian culture and Ojibwe-Dakota relationships. The park contains 19 identified archaeological sites, making it one of the most significant archaeological collections in Minnesota. The earliest site dates to the Archaic period and shows evidence of copper tool manufacture. The Dakota lived in this area roughly until the 18th century, when many bands of them were moving southward into the prairies and river areas of southern Minnesota. At the same time, Ojibwe (Anishinaabe) were moving in from the east. Ojibwe oral tradition, published by William Whipple Warren, suggests that there was a battle in which they successfully took control of the area from the Lakota.

Around the time of contact in the 1850s, loggers came to the area. The next 50 years resulted in a large quantity of trees being felled and floated down the Rum River or across Mille Lacs Lake to sawmills.

The name "Kathio" is actually a corruption of "Izatys", a name the Mdewakanton Dakota people gave themselves. Explorer Daniel Greysolon, Sieur du Lhut visited the area in 1679. He named the area "Izatys", but his poor handwriting led people to mistake the "Iz" as a "K". Further errors led to the name being transliterated to "Kathio".

The Kathio Historic District site was designated a National Historic Landmark in 1964.

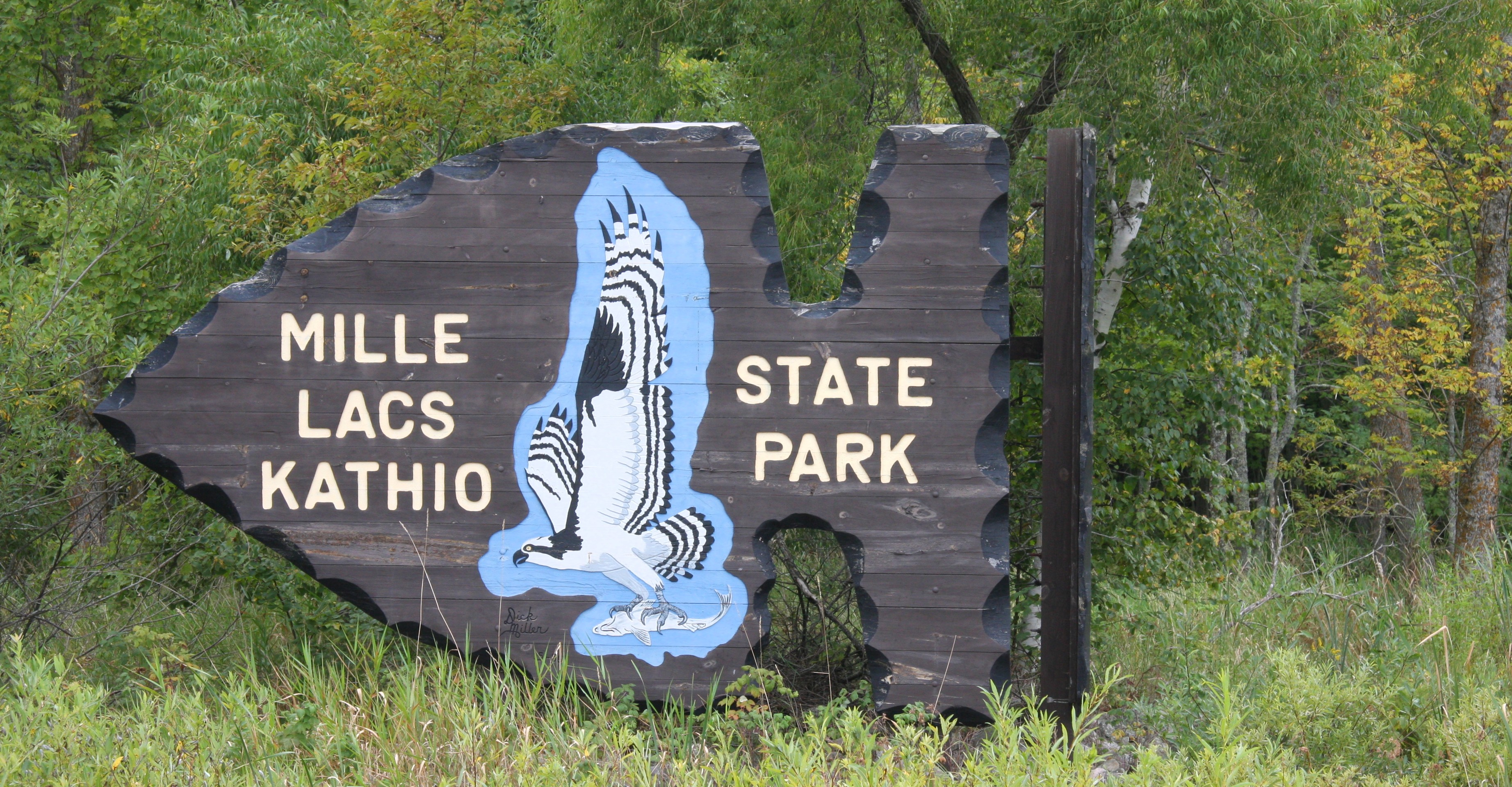
Entrance sign

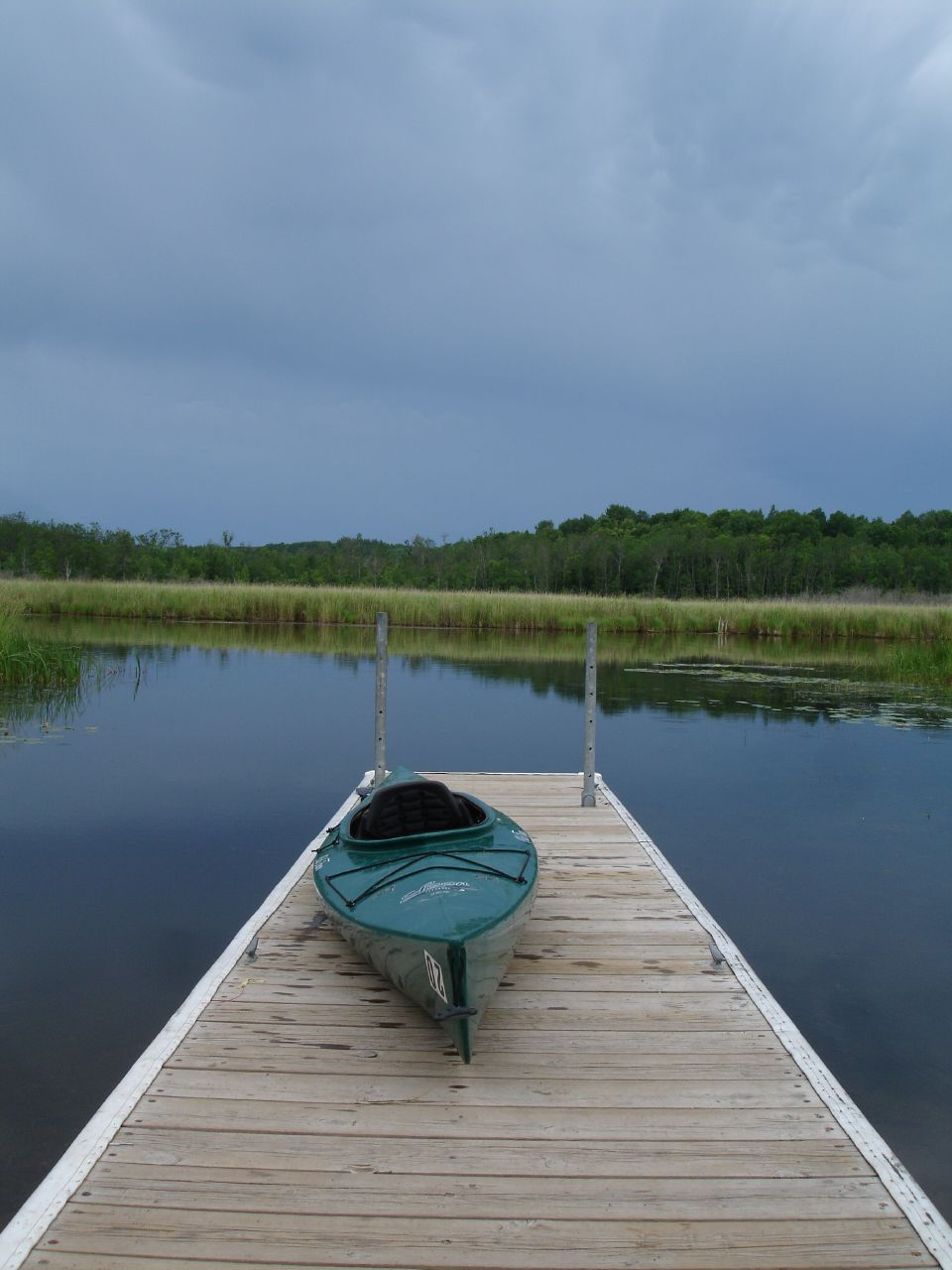
Kayak dock

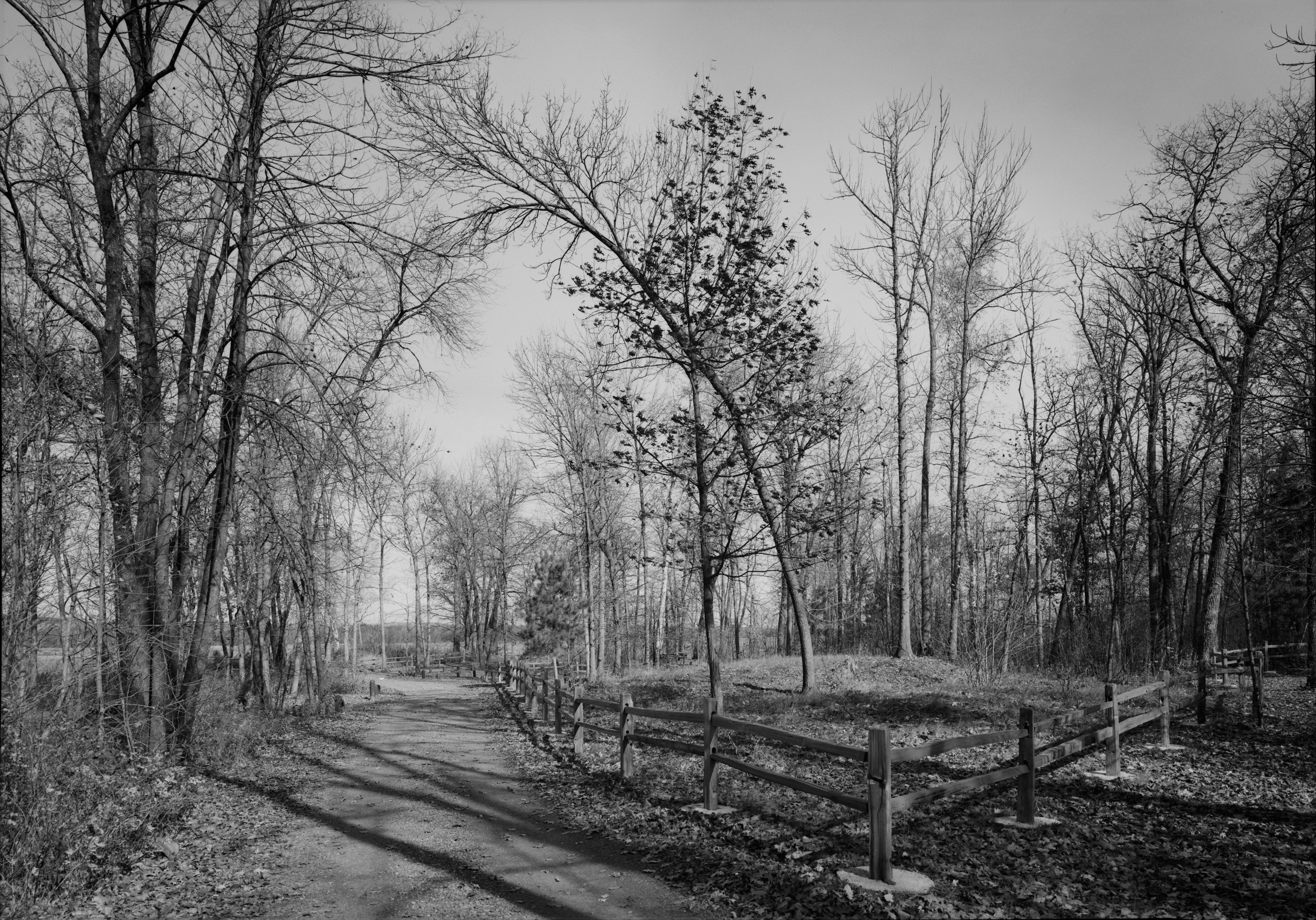
Native burial mounds

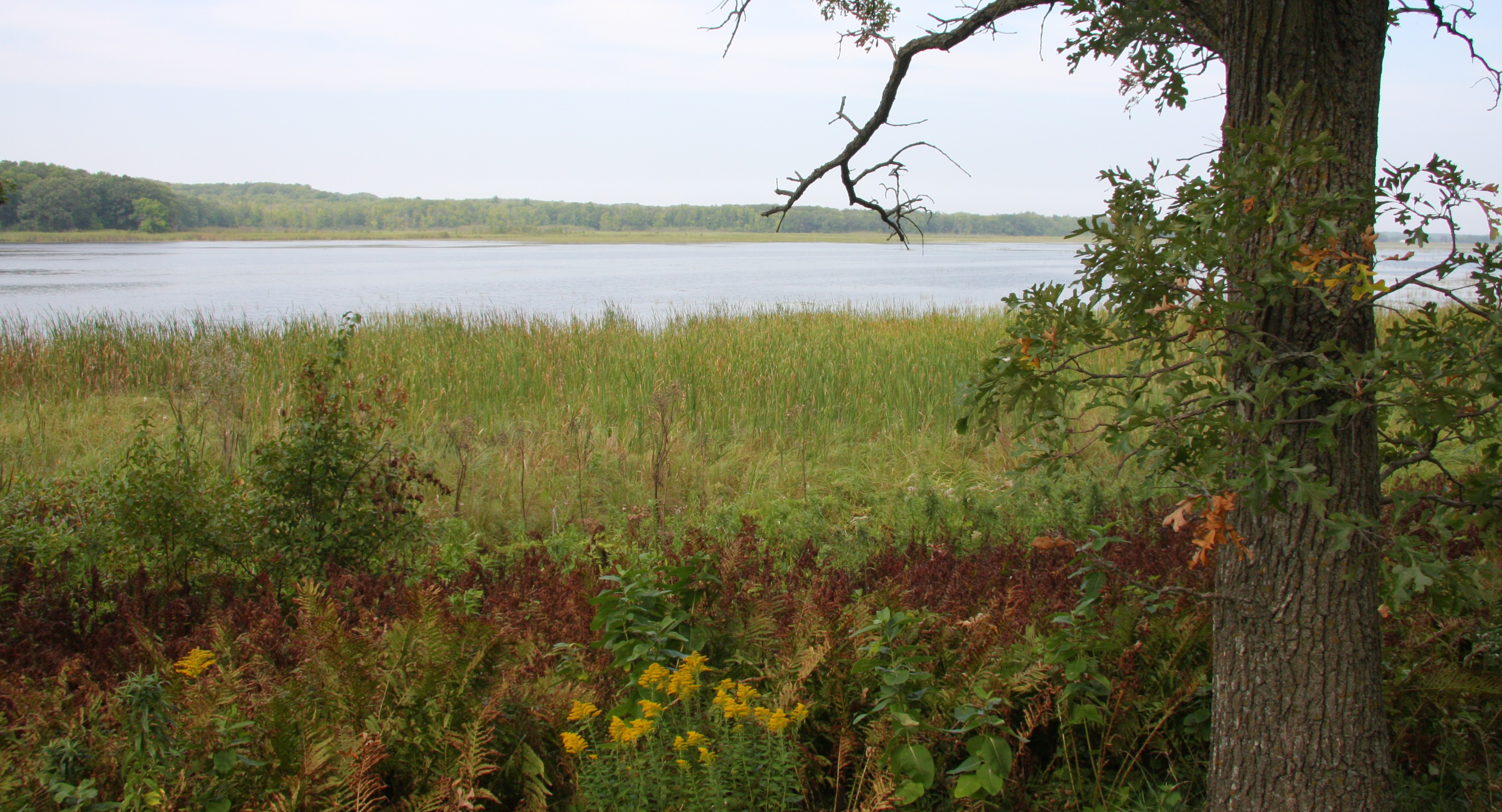
Ogechie Lake

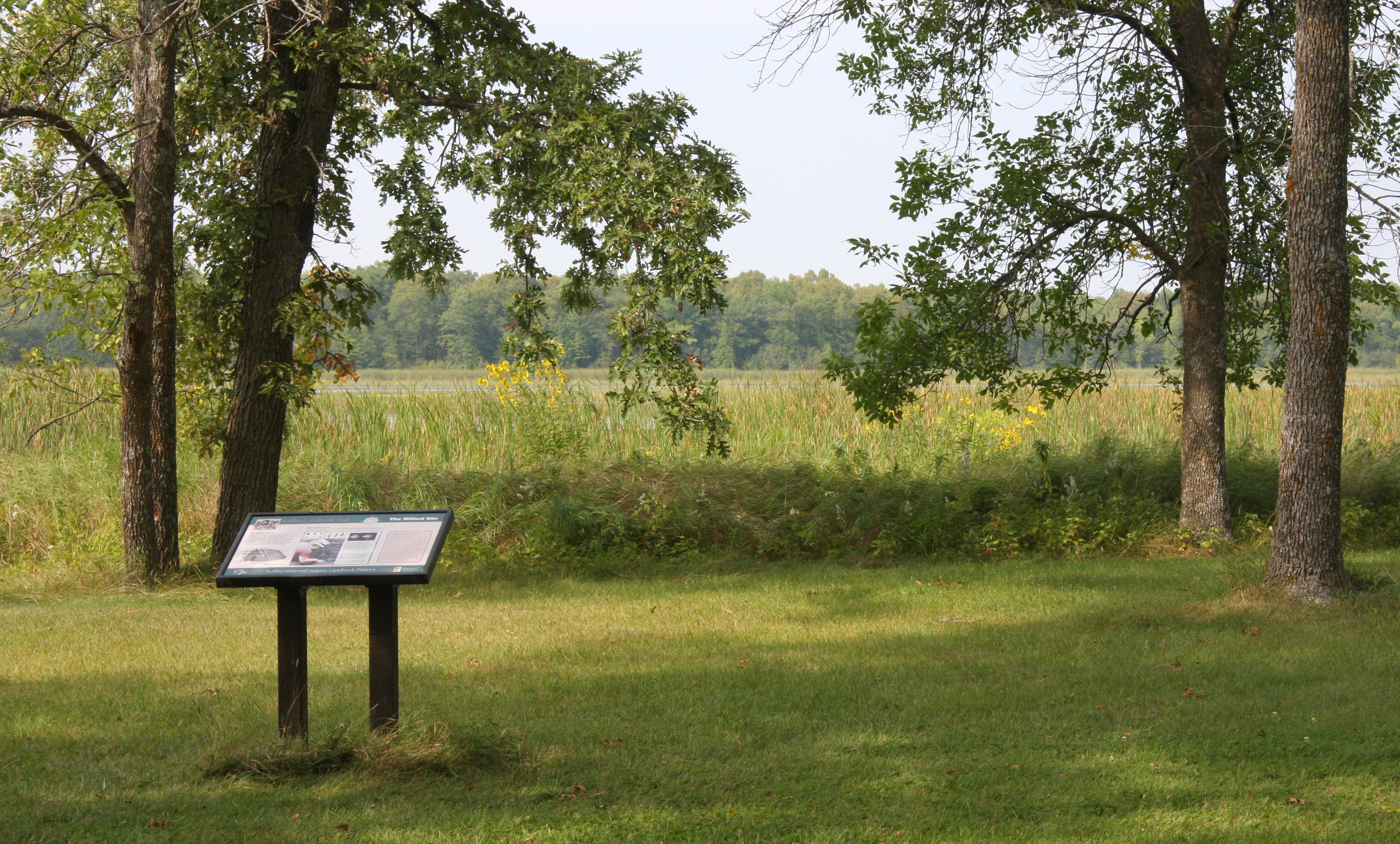
Wilford Archeological Site

== See also ==
- List of National Historic Landmarks in Minnesota
- National Register of Historic Places listings in Mille Lacs County, Minnesota
- Rum River State Forest
