= Vineland, Minnesota =

Unincorporated community in Minnesota, US

Vineland, Minnesota Neyaashiing
- Census-designated place
- Location within Minnesota Location within the United States
- Coordinates: 46°09′49″N 93°45′27″W
- Country: United States
- State: Minnesota
- County: Mille Lacs
- Township: Kathio

Area
  - Total: 9.87 sq mi (25.57 km^{2})
  - Land: 9.32 sq mi (24.15 km^{2})
  - Water: 0.55 sq mi (1.42 km^{2})
- Elevation: 1,253 ft (382 m)

Population (2020)
  - Total: 869
  - Density: 93.2/sq mi (35.99/km^{2})
- Time zone: UTC-6 (Central (CST))
  - Summer (DST): UTC-5 (CDT)
- ZIP codes: 56359 (Onamia); 56450 (Garrison)
- Area code: 320
- GNIS feature ID: 653663
- FIPS code: 27-67180

Vineland is an unincorporated community and census-designated place (CDP) in the Mille Lacs Indian Reservation portion of Mille Lacs County, Minnesota, United States. The population was 869 as of the 2020 census, down from 1,001 in 2010. Its name in the Ojibwe language is Neyaashiing, meaning "on the point of land" due to its location on Indian Point (also known as University, Cormorant or Shawboshkung Point) of Mille Lacs Lake. It serves as the administrative center for the Mille Lacs Band of Ojibwe.

Vineland is located within ZIP code 56359, based in Onamia.

== History ==
A post office called Vineland was established in 1891, and remained in operation until 1921. The community was named for the Viking colony of Vinland.

== Geography ==
Vineland is in northwestern Mille Lacs County, in the northern part of Kathio Township. Its western border is the Crow Wing County line, while its eastern border is the shore of Mille Lacs Lake. U.S. Highway 169 runs through the community close to the lake, leading south 11 miles (18 km) to Onamia and north 9 miles (14 km) to Garrison.

According to the U.S. Census Bureau, the Vineland CDP has a total area of 9.87 square miles (25.6 km^{2}), of which 9.32 square miles (24.1 km^{2}) are land and 0.55 square miles (1.42 km^{2}), or 5.57%, are water.

== Demographics ==
Historical population
| Census | Pop. | Note | %± |
|---|---|---|---|
| 2000 | 607 | | — |
| 2010 | 1,001 | | 64.9% |
| 2020 | 869 | | −13.2% |
U.S. Decennial Census

As of the census of 2000, there were 607 people, 174 households, and 136 families residing in the CDP. The population density was 92.9 inhabitants per square mile (35.9/km^{2}). There were 189 housing units at an average density of 28.9 units per square mile (11.2 units/km^{2}). The racial makeup of the CDP was 5.11% White, 94.40% Native American, and 0.49% from two or more races. Hispanic or Latino of any race were 0.82% of the population.

There were 174 households, out of which 46.6% had children under the age of 18 living with them, 16.1% were married couples living together, 49.4% had a female householder with no husband present, and 21.8% were non-families. 15.5% of all households were made up of individuals, and 6.3% had someone living alone who was 65 years of age or older. The average household size was 3.47 and the average family size was 3.85.

In the CDP, the population was spread out, with 44.3% under the age of 18, 10.0% from 18 to 24, 25.7% from 25 to 44, 13.2% from 45 to 64, and 6.8% who were 65 years of age or older. The median age was 22 years. For every 100 females, there were 93.3 males. For every 100 females age 18 and over, there were 88.8 males.

The median income for a household in the CDP was $20,208, and the median income for a family was $18,958. Males had a median income of $22,813 versus $20,938 for females. The per capita income for the CDP was $7,738. About 41.5% of families and 40.6% of the population were below the poverty line, including 46.7% of those under age 18 and 25.6% of those age 65 or over.

== Education ==
The school district is Onamia Public Schools.
