= Wahkon, Minnesota =

City in Minnesota, United States

- City
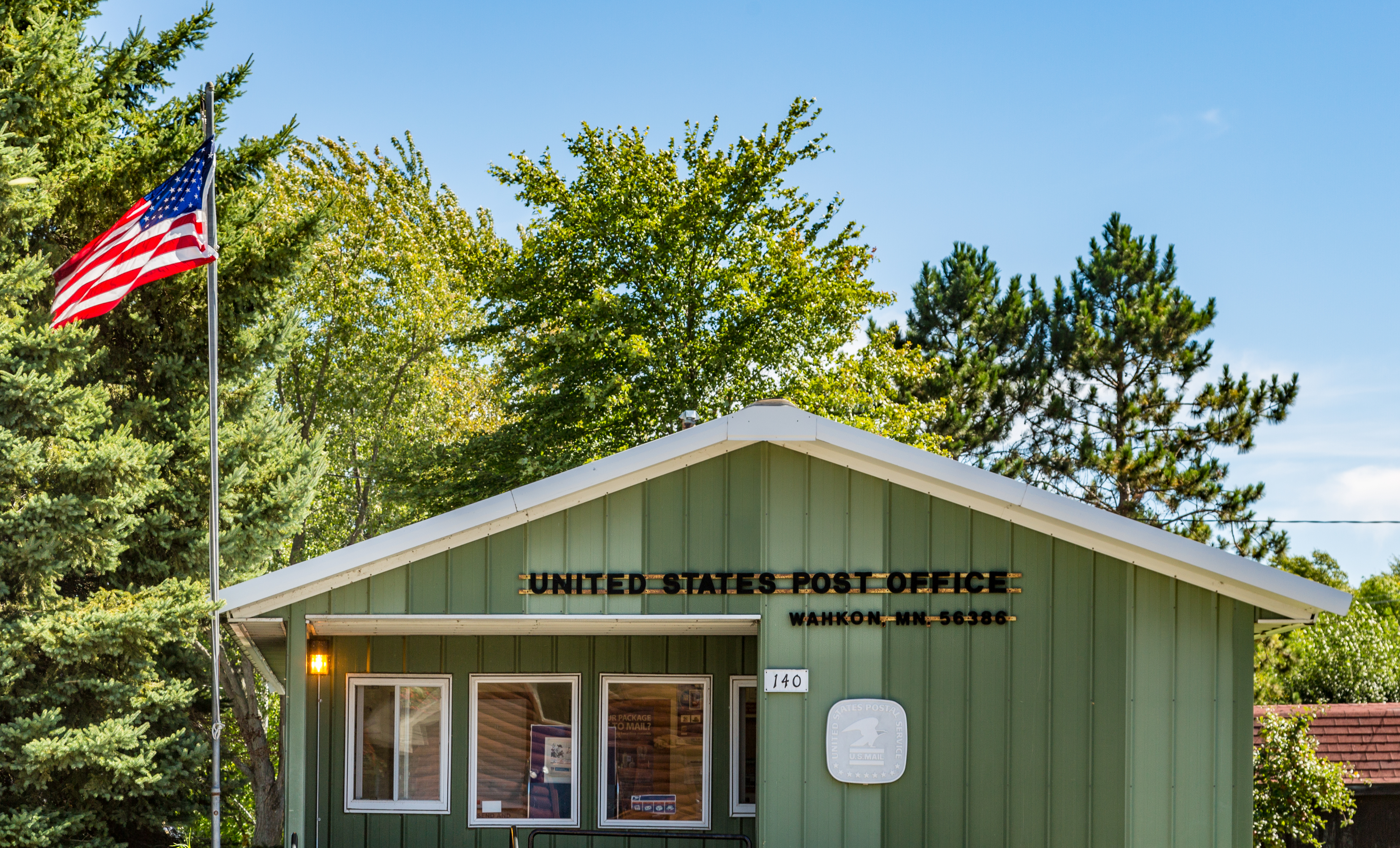
- Post office

- Location in Mille Lacs County and the state of Minnesota
- Coordinates: 46°7′22″N 93°31′12″W
- Country: United States
- State: Minnesota
- County: Mille Lacs

Area
  - Total: 0.97 sq mi (2.50 km^{2})
  - Land: 0.96 sq mi (2.48 km^{2})
  - Water: 0.0077 sq mi (0.02 km^{2})
- Elevation: 1,273 ft (388 m)

Population (2020)
  - Total: 235
  - Density: 245.8/sq mi (94.91/km^{2})
- Time zone: UTC-6 (Central (CST))
  - Summer (DST): UTC-5 (CDT)
- ZIP code: 56386
- Area code: 320
- FIPS code: 27-67558
- GNIS feature ID: 0653719
- Website: www.cityofwahkon.com

Wahkon is a city in Mille Lacs County, Minnesota, United States. The population was 235 as of the 2020 census, up from 206 in 2010.

== History ==
Wahkon was established in 1885 as "Pots Town", then its name changed to "Lawrence" in 1891 when the post office was established. A second "Pottstown" was platted next to Lawrence in 1901 by T.E. Potts. In 1907, Wahkon was platted by the Soo Line Railroad. By 1910, Pottstown and Lawrence had amalgamated into Wahkon. Wahkon was incorporated on November 6, 1912. Before the establishment of Wahkon, the site was an Ojibwe village named Sagawamick (from the Ojibwe language Zaagawaamik, meaning "Sandbar"). Prior to being an Ojibwe village, it was a Mdewakanton Dakota village.

== Geography ==
Wahkon is in northeastern Mille Lacs County. Minnesota Highway 27 passes through the city as its Main Street, leading northeast 3 miles (5 km) to Isle and southwest 9 miles (14 km) to Onamia.

According to the U.S. Census Bureau, the city of Wahkon has a total area of 0.96 square miles (2.49 km^{2}), of which 0.007 square miles (0.018 km^{2}), or 0.73%, are water. The city sits on the south and east shore of Wahkon Bay on the south side of Mille Lacs Lake.

== Demographics ==
Historical population
Census	Pop.	Note	%±
1920	292		—
1930	228		−21.9%
1940	273		19.7%
1950	202		−26.0%
1960	172		−14.9%
1970	208		20.9%
1980	271		30.3%
1990	197		−27.3%
2000	314		59.4%
2010	206		−34.4%
2020	235		14.1%
U.S. Decennial Census

=== 2010 census ===
As of the census of 2010, there were 206 people, 100 households, and 52 families residing in the city. The population density was 214.6 inhabitants per square mile (82.9/km^{2}). There were 206 housing units at an average density of 214.6 per square mile (82.9/km^{2}). The racial makeup of the city was 95.1% White, 2.4% Native American, 0.5% Asian, and 1.9% from two or more races. Hispanic or Latino of any race were 1.0% of the population.

There were 100 households, of which 20.0% had children under the age of 18 living with them, 36.0% were married couples living together, 10.0% had a female householder with no husband present, 6.0% had a male householder with no wife present, and 48.0% were non-families. 36.0% of all households were made up of individuals, and 13% had someone living alone who was 65 years of age or older. The average household size was 2.06 and the average family size was 2.58.

The median age in the city was 49.7 years. 15.5% of residents were under the age of 18; 7.4% were between the ages of 18 and 24; 17.5% were from 25 to 44; 35.9% were from 45 to 64; and 23.8% were 65 years of age or older. The gender makeup of the city was 51.9% male and 48.1% female.

=== 2000 census ===
As of the census of 2000, there were 314 people, 150 households, and 79 families residing in the city. The population density was 320.7 inhabitants per square mile (123.8/km^{2}). There were 256 housing units at an average density of 261.5 per square mile (101.0/km^{2}). The racial makeup of the city was 92.99% White, 5.41% Native American, 0.64% from other races, and 0.96% from two or more races. Hispanic or Latino of any race were 0.96% of the population.

There were 150 households, out of which 18.7% had children under the age of 18 living with them, 42.7% were married couples living together, 7.3% had a female householder with no husband present, and 47.3% were non-families. 39.3% of all households were made up of individuals, and 15.3% had someone living alone who was 65 years of age or older. The average household size was 2.09 and the average family size was 2.78.

In the city, the population was spread out, with 20.1% under the age of 18, 7.6% from 18 to 24, 19.1% from 25 to 44, 31.8% from 45 to 64, and 21.3% who were 65 years of age or older. The median age was 48 years. For every 100 females, there were 113.6 males. For every 100 females age 18 and over, there were 118.3 males.

The median income for a household in the city was $22,321, and the median income for a family was $35,000. Males had a median income of $35,417 versus $13,958 for females. The per capita income for the city was $16,088. About 16.2% of families and 22.6% of the population were below the poverty line, including 40.0% of those under age 18 and 18.2% of those age 65 or over.
