= Kathio Township, Mille Lacs County, Minnesota =

Kathio Township, Minnesota
- Township
- Location within the state of Minnesota Kathio Township, Minnesota (the United States)
- Coordinates: 46°12′15″N 93°46′36″W
- Country: United States
- State: Minnesota
- County: Mille Lacs

Area
  - Total: 72.6 sq mi (188.1 km^{2})
  - Land: 42.4 sq mi (109.8 km^{2})
  - Water: 30.2 sq mi (78.2 km^{2})
- Elevation: 1,253 ft (382 m)

Population (2010)
  - Total: 1,627
  - Density: 38.38/sq mi (14.82/km^{2})
- Time zone: UTC-6 (Central (CST))
  - Summer (DST): UTC-5 (CDT)
- FIPS code: 27-32516
- GNIS feature ID: 0664603

Kathio Township is a township in Mille Lacs County, Minnesota, United States. The population was 1,627 at the 2010 census. It contains the census-designated place of Vineland.

== Geography ==
According to the United States Census Bureau, the township has a total area of 72.6 square miles (188 km^{2}), of which 42.4 square miles (110 km^{2}) is land and 30.2 square miles (78 km^{2}), or 41.59%, is water.

== Demographics ==
As of the census of 2000, there were 1,309 people, 483 households, and 339 families residing in the township. The population density was 30.9 inhabitants per square mile (11.9/km^{2}). There were 780 housing units at an average density of 18.4 per square mile (7.1/km^{2}). The racial makeup of the township was 43.70% White, 0.15% African American, 54.39% Native American, 0.08% Asian, 0.15% from other races, and 1.53% from two or more races. Hispanic or Latino of any race were 0.84% of the population.

There were 483 households, out of which 30.4% had children under the age of 18 living with them, 38.9% were married couples living together, 22.4% had a female householder with no husband present, and 29.8% were non-families. 25.3% of all households were made up of individuals, and 10.6% had someone living alone who was 65 years of age or older. The average household size was 2.70 and the average family size was 3.21.

In the township the population was spread out, with 31.8% under the age of 18, 8.3% from 18 to 24, 23.9% from 25 to 44, 21.9% from 45 to 64, and 14.1% who were 65 years of age or older. The median age was 35 years. For every 100 females, there were 98.9 males. For every 100 females age 18 and over, there were 100.7 males.

The median income for a household in the township was $26,719, and the median income for a family was $31,989. Males had a median income of $25,417 versus $20,625 for females. The per capita income for the township was $13,690. About 21.6% of families and 24.7% of the population were below the poverty line, including 38.3% of those under age 18 and 8.2% of those age 65 or over.
