= Mille Lacs Lake =

Lake in the state of Minnesota, United States

- Lac des Mille Lacs (French)
- Misi-zaaga'igan (Ojibwe); Bdé Wakháŋ (Dakota)
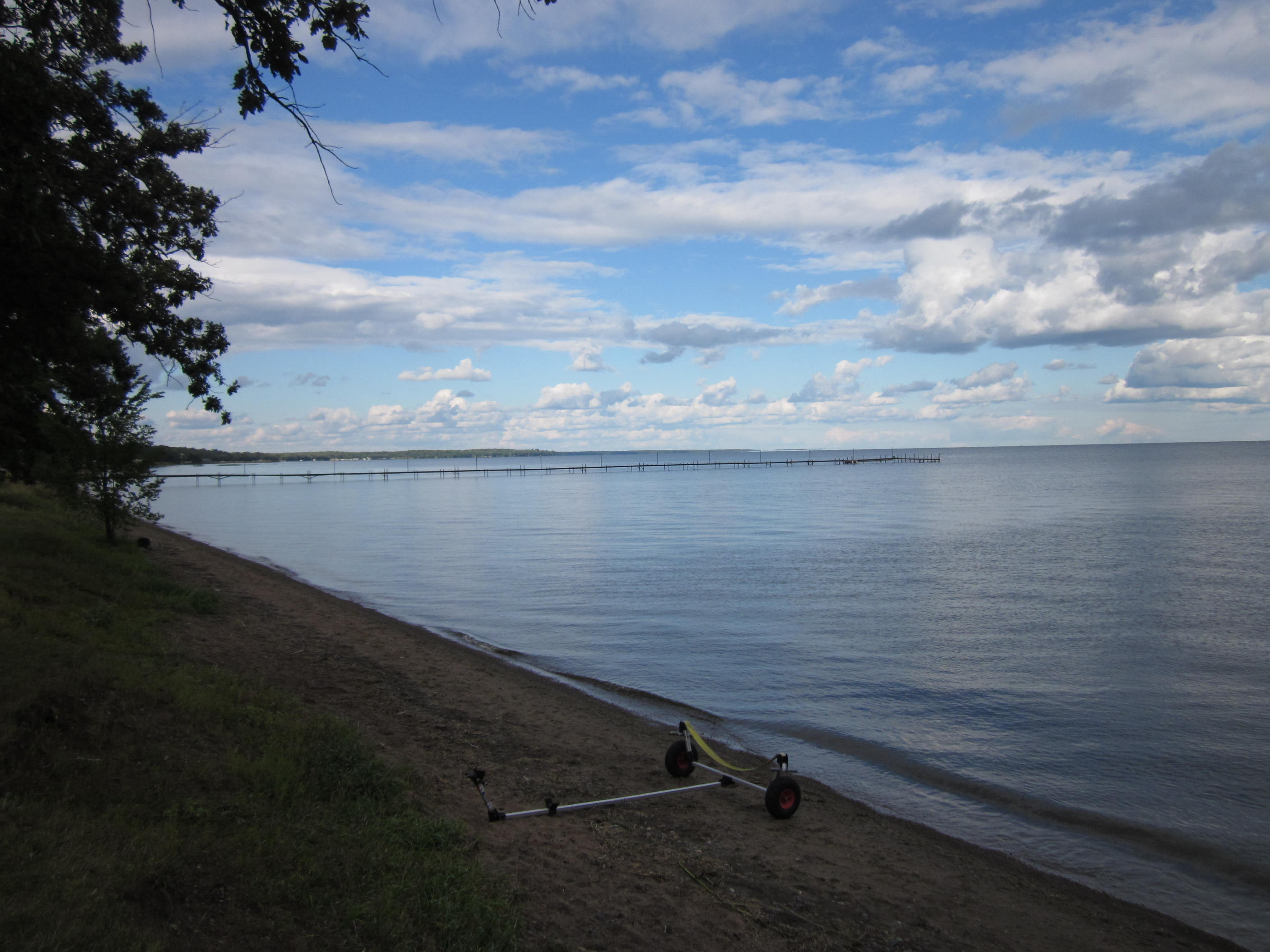
- Lake in September 2011

- Location within Minnesota
- Location: Aitkin / Mille Lacs / Crow Wing Counties, Minnesota, US
- Coordinates: 46°14′17.27″N 93°38′36.29″W
- Type: Moraine-dammed lake
- Primary inflows: Garrison Creek, Seguchie Creek, Peterson Creek, and Thain's River
- Primary outflows: Rum River
- Basin countries: United States
- Surface area: 132,516 acres (207 sq mi; 536 km^{2})
- Max. depth: 42 ft (13 m)
- Surface elevation: 1,251 ft (381 m)
- Settlements: see list

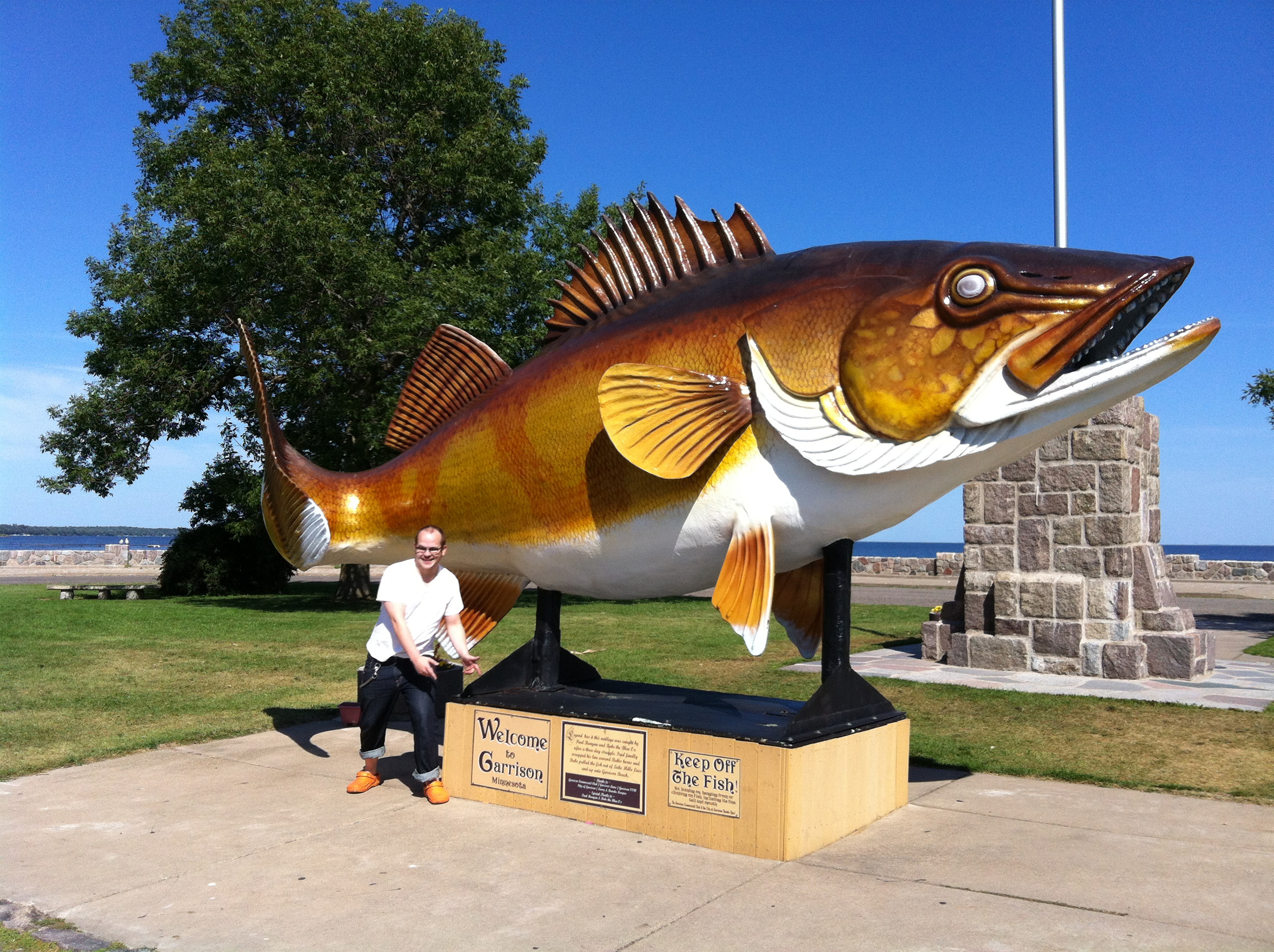
Fishing on Mille Lacs Lake is promoted by a giant walleye statue. It is located off of U.S. Route 169 in Garrison.

Mille Lacs Lake (/məˈlæks/ mə-LAKS, also called Lake Mille Lacs or Mille Lacs) is a large, shallow lake in the U.S. state of Minnesota. It is located in the counties of Mille Lacs, Aitkin, and Crow Wing, roughly 75 miles (121 km) north of the Minneapolis-St. Paul metropolitan area.

Mille Lacs means "thousand lakes" in French. In the Ojibwe language of the people who historically occupied this area, the lake is called Misi-zaaga'igan ("grand lake").

== Physical features ==
Mille Lacs is Minnesota's second-largest inland lake at 132,516 acres (536 km^{2}), after Red Lake. The maximum depth is 42 feet (13 m). Much of the main lake has depths ranging from 20 to 30 feet (6 to 9 m). Gravel and rock bars are common in the southern half of the lake.

=== Islands ===
Mille Lacs Lake hosts numerous islands, many of which are 1-acre (4,047 m^{2}) or smaller and are in private ownership.

The following list is in order from largest to smallest.

- Malone Island (35 acres (141,640 m^{2}))
- Mulybys Island (5.35 acres (21,651 m^{2}))
- Upper Twin Island (3.35 acres (13,557 m^{2}))
- Rainbow Island (3.25 acres (13,152 m^{2}))
- West Lower Twin Island (2.56 acres (10,360 m^{2}))
- Half Moon Island (1.37 acres (5,544 m^{2}))
- Pete Island (0.6 acres (2,428 m^{2}))
- Doe Island (0.55 acres (2,226 m^{2}))
- Spider Island (0.5 acres (2,023 m^{2}))
- East Lower Twin Island (0.4 acres (1,619 m^{2}))
- Spirit Island (0.31 acres (1,255 m^{2}))
- Pine Island (0.23 acres (931 m^{2}))
- Hennepin Island (0.17 acres (688 m^{2}))

== Fishing ==
Shallow reef-top fishing exists on all sides of the lake. Deep-water angling takes place on the southern deep gravel and rocks as well as on dozens of mud flats in the north half of the lake. Shoreline break fishing on varied bottom types occurs all around the lake. The weed line is at 9 to 12 feet (3 to 4 m). There are many local fisherman's names for some features of the lake. Spirit Island, the small rock-made island in the south west region of the lake, consists of weathered and eroded pink and white granite boulders. Spirit Island is one of two Islands in Mille Lakes Lake designated as a National Wildlife Refuge.

The lake has many species of fish including walleye, northern pike, muskie, jumbo perch, smallmouth bass, largemouth bass, black crappie, burbot, and tullibee. It is one of Minnesota's most popular fishing lakes. Ice fishing houses number in the thousands during the winter. It is a prime spawning grounds for walleye. Billions of walleye eggs and fry are produced there every year. In the absence of a thermocline, fish can travel the whole area of the lake.

The population of walleye (Sander vitreus) reached an all-time low in 2016, along with a decrease in cisco (Coregonus artedi) abundance. These population decreases were attributed to high temperatures, high fishing pressure, and cannibalism of juvenile walleye. However, a steady increase in the walleye population was observed throughout 2023 and 2024, leading to less restricted fishing regulations from the Minnesota Department of Natural Resources.

The fishing regulations for the Mille Lacs Band of Ojibwe differ from the regulations for the public. While the fishing regulations for the public are subject to change season-by-season, the Mille Lacs Band of Ojibwe retain their fishing, hunting, and harvesting rights from the 1837 Treaty. The Band's fishing and hunting are regulated by their Conservation Code.

== History ==
Archaeologists indicate that the area around the lake is one of the earliest known sites of human settlement in the state of Minnesota. The Rum River drains from Lake Mille Lacs into the Mississippi River to the south at present-day Anoka.

On early French maps, the lake was also identified as Lac Buade or Minsisaugaigun. On a 1733 map by Henry Popple, Mille Lacs Lake is shown as "Lake Miſsiſsucaigan or Baude". As late as 1843, it was referred to as "Mini Sagaigonin or Mille Lacs" on United States government maps.

The lake is known in Dakota as Bdé Wakháŋ (Spiritual/Mystic Lake). The Mdewakanton group of the Santee Sioux identified by their location around the lake. In Ojibwe, the lake is known as Misi-zaaga'igan megwe Midaaswaakogamaakaan (Grand/Great/Big Lake in the Region of a Thousand Lakes), or simply as Misi-zaaga'igan (Grand Lake), as it is the largest lake in the Brainerd Lakes Area. Likewise, the French named the lake as "Mille Lacs Lake" (Lac des Mille Lacs), as the Brainerd Lakes Area was called "Region of Thousand Lakes" (Pays des Mille Lacs).

Areas around the lake are protected and available to the public in state parks: Father Hennepin State Park and Mille Lacs Kathio State Park. Portions of the Mille Lacs Indian Reservation, of the federally recognized Mille Lacs Ojibwe, border the lake.

In 2013, a windblown wall of ice, called an ice shove, moved off the lake and damaged houses on the lake shore.

== Biogeochemistry ==
=== Geologic setting and sediments ===
Mille lacs lake region is located on basin shaped by late Pleistocene glaciation in east-central Minnesota. A study done by the Minnesota DNR on Mille Lacs Kathio State Park describes the lake as a moraine-blocked basin formed from melting glacier water trapped within the moraine. The study also describes how lake levels used to be much higher post glacier melting and that the lake drained through various outlets such as rum river and the channel to lake onamia.

Deposits around the lake of granite, silt, and gravel are evidence of this once higher shoreline. These sediments were deposited through melting ice and now extinct lake channels.

=== Zebra mussels and nutrient cycling ===
Zebra mussels in Mille Lacs Lake have altered nutrient cycling, filtering suspended particles from the water column and disrupting natural cycling patterns. Filter feeding can increase water clarity while moving nutrients and organic matter from the pelagic zone to the lake bottom through feces, pseudofeces, and shell material. This process can increase the importance of benthic nutrient cycling while reducing the amount of suspended food available to planktonic organisms.

In Mille Lacs Lake, increased water clarity following zebra mussel establishment may also affect aquatic vegetation and fish habitat. Clearer water allows light to penetrate deeper into the lake, which can expand benthic plant growth and change habitat conditions for species such as walleye, cisco, northern pike, and smallmouth bass.

=== Mixing, oxygen, and nutrient distribution ===
Because Mille Lacs Lake is broad and relatively shallow, wind-driven mixing can redistribute dissolved oxygen and nutrients through much of the water column during the ice-free season. This mixing limits long-term stratification compared with deeper dimictic lakes, although short-term thermal layering may still occur during calm or warm periods. Mixing affects biogeochemical conditions by controlling how phosphorus, nitrogen, organic matter, and dissolved oxygen move between the water column and bottom sediments. These conditions are important for primary production, forage availability, and fish habitat in the lake.

=== Trophic state ===
Mille Lacs Lake has an overall trophic state index (TSI) of 43, making it moderately mesotrophic. This trophic state index is within the expected overall TSI range of lakes within its ecoregion.

==== Nutrient levels ====
Compared to other lakes within the ecoregion, the total phosphorus, chlorophyll a, and Secchi depth are all within expected ranges, while chloride, total suspended solids, and conductivity levels are all above their expected ranges. Higher levels of planktivores affect food and nutrient availability needed by other species within the lake.

Low total nitrogen to total phosphorus ratios indicate that the lake is phosphorus limited, which combines with relatively low total Kjeldahl Nitrogen to largely limit algal bloom growths.

===== Mediators of eutrophication =====
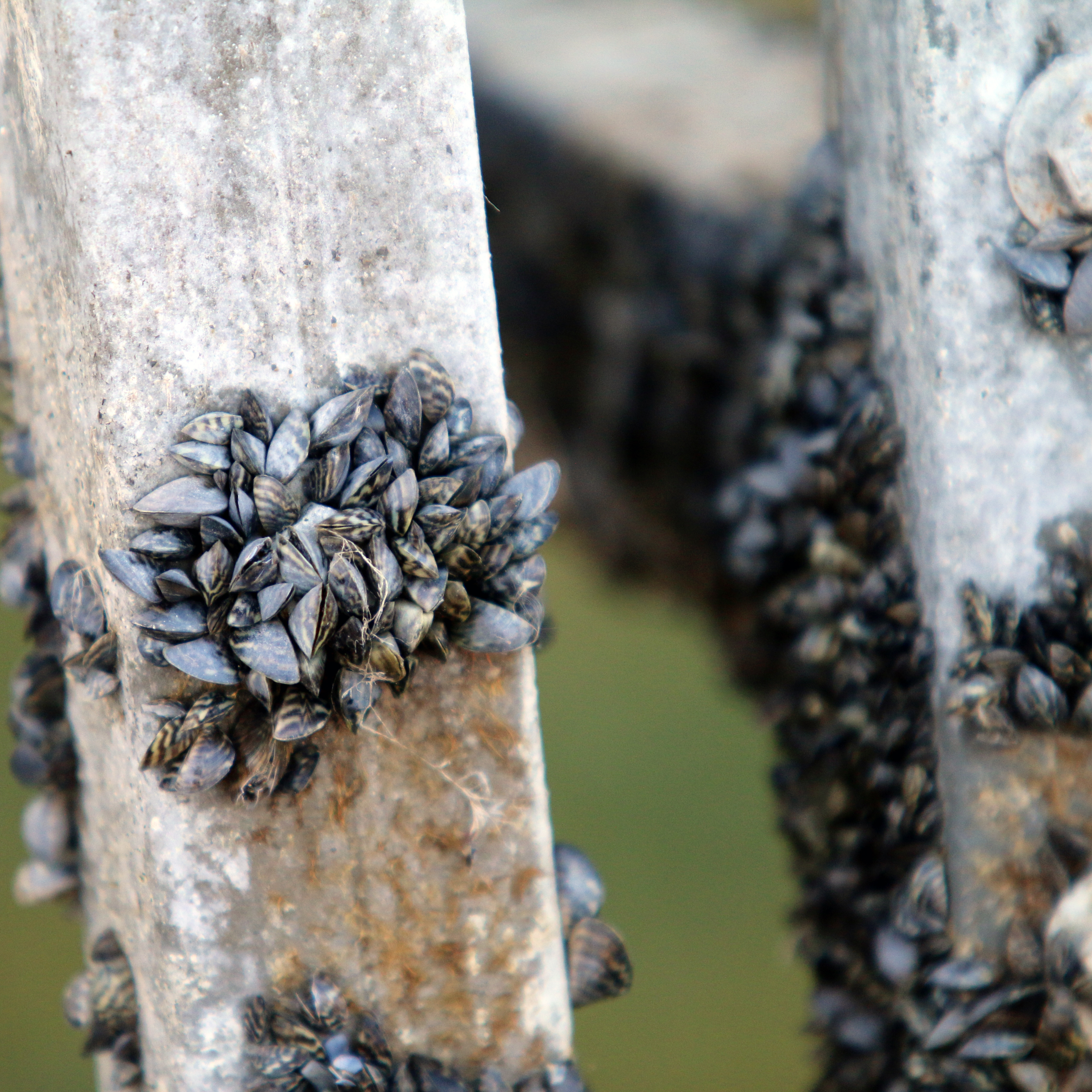
Invasive zebra mussels in Minnesota lake

Zebra mussels, an aquatic invasive species, became established in Mille Lacs Lake around 2005. The presence of zebra mussels has reduced the trophic state index of the lake, with Secchi depth readings increasing noticeably since their arrival, likely due to their methods of filter feeding on suspended particles. A sharp rise in water transparency of the lake after the year 2010, measured via Secchi depth, coincides with the zebra mussel invasion timeline. As the water clarity is increased within the lake, levels of aquatic vegetation may also increase. This has the potential to alter fish habitats, proving desirable for some species' productivity and undesirable for others'. It is common for increased water clarity to contribute to decreased productivity and abundance of walleye, which is most commonly fished in the lake. Zebra mussels are also known for taking in nutrients from the water column and sequestering it in sediments, thereby reducing the nutrients available to primary producers within the water column. Levels of phosphorus and chlorophyll a, however, are reported to have remained consistent since the invasion, which has been seen before in unstratified lakes.

==== Historical effects of human activity ====
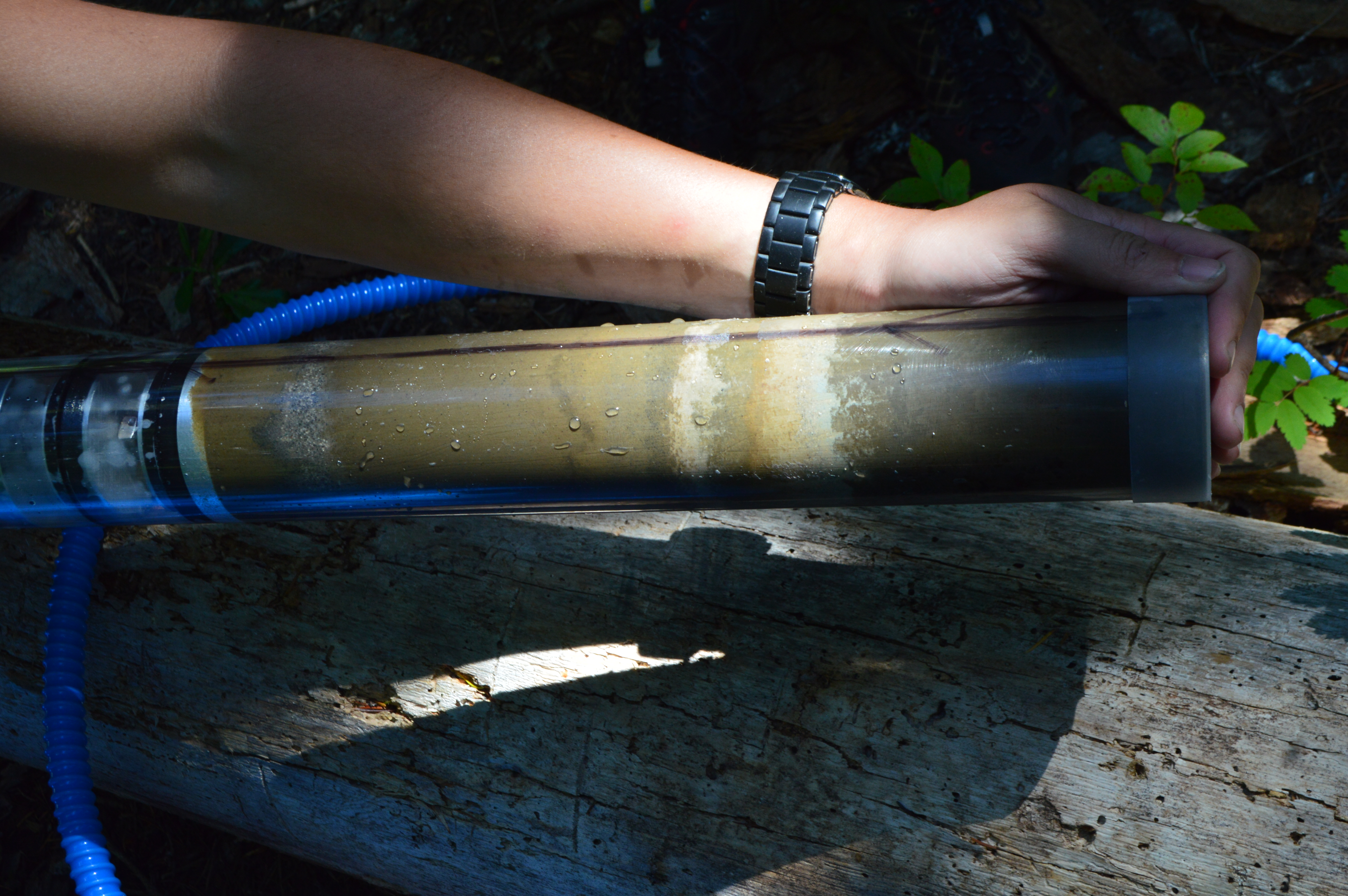
Example lake sediment core

Runoff caused by the growth of agriculture in the surrounding area, as well as other anthropogenic factors, caused increasing levels of sediment and phosphorus buildup from the 1960's until at least the early 2000's. This was evident from the analysis of a sediment core drawn from the lake in 2002, which also determined that while few new microbial species had established themselves in the lake since European settlement, microbial communities have still been affected by nutrient and sediment loading. In particular, the sediment core demonstrated the decline of bottom dwelling microbes in favor of microbial taxa that float freely in the water column, likely as a result of increased phosphorus availability within the pelagic zone of the lake. Note that this sediment core was taken before the introduction of zebra mussels, which are known to increase the flux of nutrients from pelagic environments to sediments.

Ground-water can also be an indication of anthropogenic effects. Ground-water in the surrounding areas of Mille Lacs Lake occurs in glacial and bedrock aquifers. Water from these aquifers is released through well withdrawals, escape into nearby aquifers, and flow into bodies of water like Lake Mille Lacs and the Rum River. Upon inspection of this groundwater in the late 1990's, sodium, manganese, and iron levels repeatedly exceeded acceptable EPA standards for health and drinking water. Multiple common pesticides, trace metals, and volatile organic compounds were also found in samples, but were below detection limits, except for zinc levels. Possible sources of groundwater contamination within lakes due to anthropogenic effects can include but are not limited to land usage and commercial, industrial, and agricultural activities.

== Settlements on the lake ==
- Garrison, Minnesota
- Isle, Minnesota
- Malmo Township, Minnesota
- Onamia, Minnesota
- Vineland, Minnesota
- Wahkon, Minnesota
- Wealthwood Township, Minnesota

== See also ==
- List of lakes in Minnesota
