= Onamia, Minnesota =

City in Minnesota, United States

Onamia, Minnesota Gibaakwa'iganing (Ojibwe)
- City
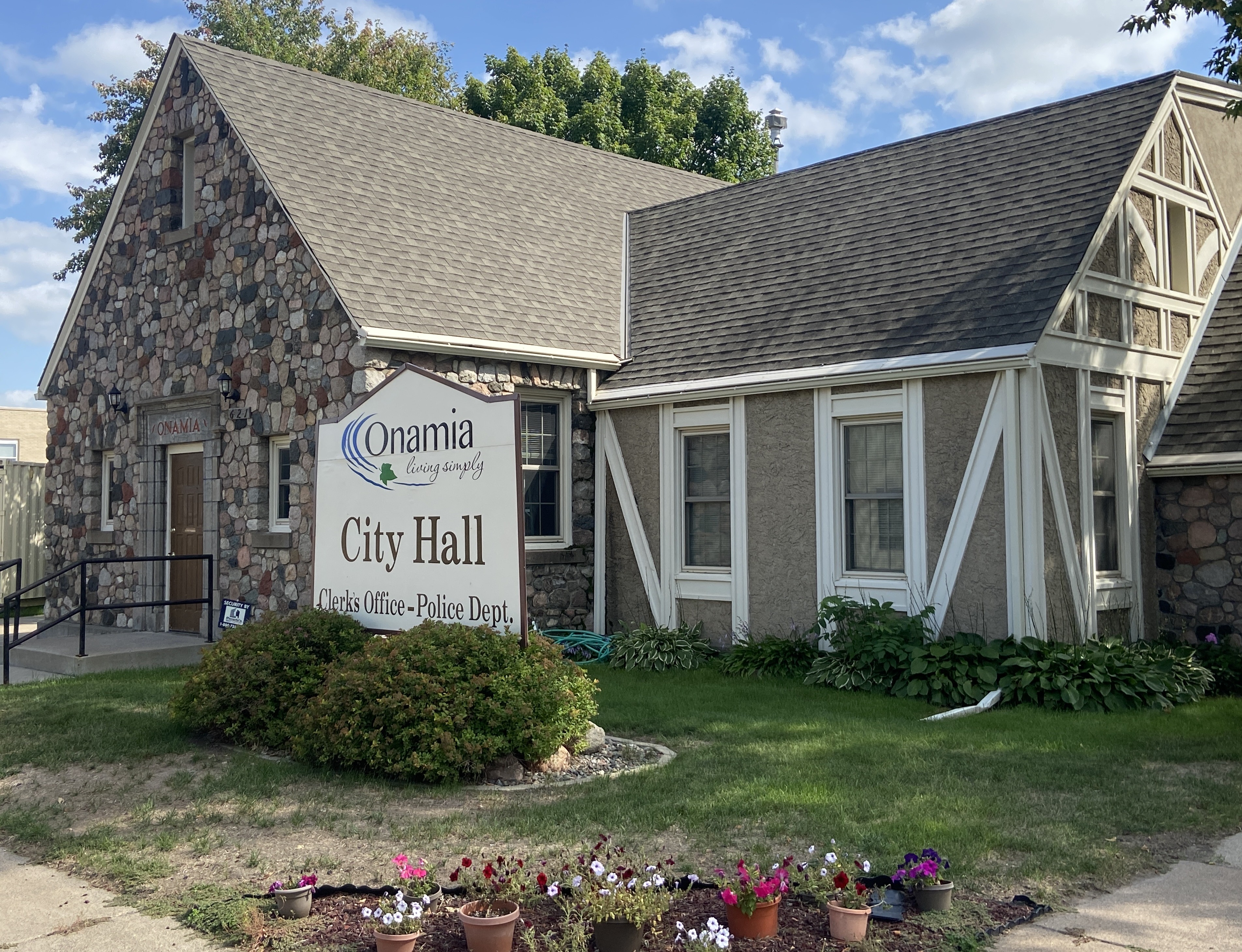
- Onamia City Hall

- Location in Mille Lacs County, Minnesota
- Coordinates: 46°4′12″N 93°40′6″W
- Country: United States
- State: Minnesota
- County: Mille Lacs

Area
  - Total: 1.00 sq mi (2.59 km^{2})
  - Land: 0.98 sq mi (2.54 km^{2})
  - Water: 0.019 sq mi (0.05 km^{2})
- Elevation: 1,263 ft (385 m)

Population (2020)
  - Total: 784
  - Density: 798.3/sq mi (308.23/km^{2})
- Time zone: UTC-6 (Central (CST))
  - Summer (DST): UTC-5 (CDT)
- ZIP code: 56359
- Area code: 320
- FIPS code: 27-48310
- GNIS feature ID: 0648967
- Website: onamiamn.com

Onamia (/oʊˈneɪmiːə/ oh-NAYM-ee-ə, Ojibwe: Gibaakwa'iganing) is a city in Mille Lacs County, Minnesota, United States. The population was 784 as of the 2020 census, down from 878 in 2010. U.S. Highway 169 and Minnesota State Highway 27 are the main routes in the community.

== History ==
Originally, the city of Onamia was organized from the merger of two communities, the village of Onamia (Ojibwe: Onamanii-zaaga'iganiing) and the village of Ericksonville (Ojibwe: Gibaakwa'igaansing). Onamia is named after Lake Onamia, whose name derives from the Ojibwe word onaman ("red ochre", or, locally, "vermilion"). Ericksonville was incorporated in 1898. Onamia was incorporated in 1908.

== Geography ==
Onamia is in northern Mille Lacs County, on the south shore of Lake Onamia and 3 miles (5 km) south of Mille Lacs Lake. U.S. Route 169 passes through the east side of the city, leading south 22 miles (35 km) to Milaca, the county seat, and north 20 miles (32 km) to Garrison on the northwest shore of Mille Lacs Lake. State Highway 27 passes through Onamia as its Main Street, leading northeast 12 miles (19 km) to Isle at the southeast end of Mille Lacs Lake, and west 40 miles (64 km) to Little Falls on the Mississippi River.

According to the U.S. Census Bureau, the city of Onamia has an area of 1.00 square mile (2.59 km^{2}), of which 0.98 square miles (2.54 km^{2}) are land and 0.02 square miles (0.05 km^{2}), or 2.00%, are water. The city is bordered to the north by Lake Onamia. The lake is fed and drained by the Rum River; the lake's outlet is in the western part of the city. The Rum River continues south to Milaca and ultimately the Mississippi River at Anoka.

Mille Lacs Kathio State Park is 4 miles (6 km) northwest of the city. Sections of the Rum River State Forest are nearby.

== Demographics ==
Historical population
| Census | Pop. | Note | %± |
|---|---|---|---|
| 1910 | 314 | | — |
| 1920 | 416 | | 32.5% |
| 1930 | 514 | | 23.6% |
| 1940 | 619 | | 20.4% |
| 1950 | 704 | | 13.7% |
| 1960 | 645 | | −8.4% |
| 1970 | 670 | | 3.9% |
| 1980 | 691 | | 3.1% |
| 1990 | 676 | | −2.2% |
| 2000 | 847 | | 25.3% |
| 2010 | 878 | | 3.7% |
| 2020 | 784 | | −10.7% |
U.S. Decennial Census

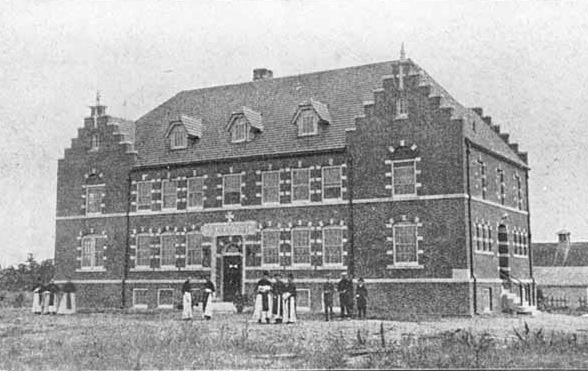
A recently constructed cloister in Onamia, 1922

=== 2010 census ===
As of the census of 2010, there were 878 people, 349 households, and 167 families living in the city. The population density was 914.6 inhabitants per square mile (353.1/km^{2}). There were 398 housing units at an average density of 414.6 per square mile (160.1/km^{2}). The racial makeup of the city was 83.0% White, 2.3% African American, 9.9% Native American, 0.7% Asian, 0.3% from other races, and 3.8% from two or more races. Hispanic or Latino of any race were 1.7% of the population.

There were 349 households, of which 26.9% had children under the age of 18 living with them, 26.9% were married couples living together, 14.9% had a female householder with no husband present, 6.0% had a male householder with no wife present, and 52.1% were non-families. 46.4% of all households were made up of individuals, and 26.7% had someone living alone who was 65 years of age or older. The average household size was 2.07 and the average family size was 2.84.

The median age in the city was 41.7 years. 28% of residents were under the age of 18; 9.4% were between the ages of 18 and 24; 15.3% were from 25 to 44; 22.7% were from 45 to 64; and 24.7% were 65 years of age or older. The gender makeup of the city was 53.4% male and 46.6% female.

=== 2000 census ===
As of the census of 2000, there were 847 people, 318 households, and 171 families living in the city. The population density was 938.3 inhabitants per square mile (362.3/km^{2}). There were 355 housing units at an average density of 393.3 per square mile (151.9/km^{2}). The racial makeup of the city was 90.20% White, 0.94% African American, 6.49% Native American, 0.24% from other races, and 2.13% from two or more races. Hispanic or Latino of any race were 1.18% of the population.

There were 318 households, out of which 26.4% had children under the age of 18 living with them, 38.1% were married couples living together, 12.3% had a female householder with no husband present, and 46.2% were non-families. 42.8% of all households were made up of individuals, and 23.9% had someone living alone who was 65 years of age or older. The average household size was 2.16 and the average family size was 2.98.

In the city, the population was spread out, with 28.5% under the age of 18, 7.8% from 18 to 24, 18.8% from 25 to 44, 18.8% from 45 to 64, and 26.2% who were 65 years of age or older. The median age was 41 years. For every 100 females, there were 90.8 males. For every 100 females age 18 and over, there were 77.7 males.

The median income for a household in the city was $21,250, and the median income for a family was $32,500. Males had a median income of $31,000 versus $19,375 for females. The per capita income for the city was $12,857. About 11.9% of families and 14.6% of the population were below the poverty line, including 18.0% of those under age 18 and 7.3% of those age 65 or over.

== Education ==
The public school system is Onamia Public Schools.

The Nay Ah Shing School, a K–12 tribal school, operates its secondary school and the Abinoojiiyag School (a primary school facility) in a nearby unincorporated area.

== Notable people ==
- Shane Bauer – author

== Gallery ==
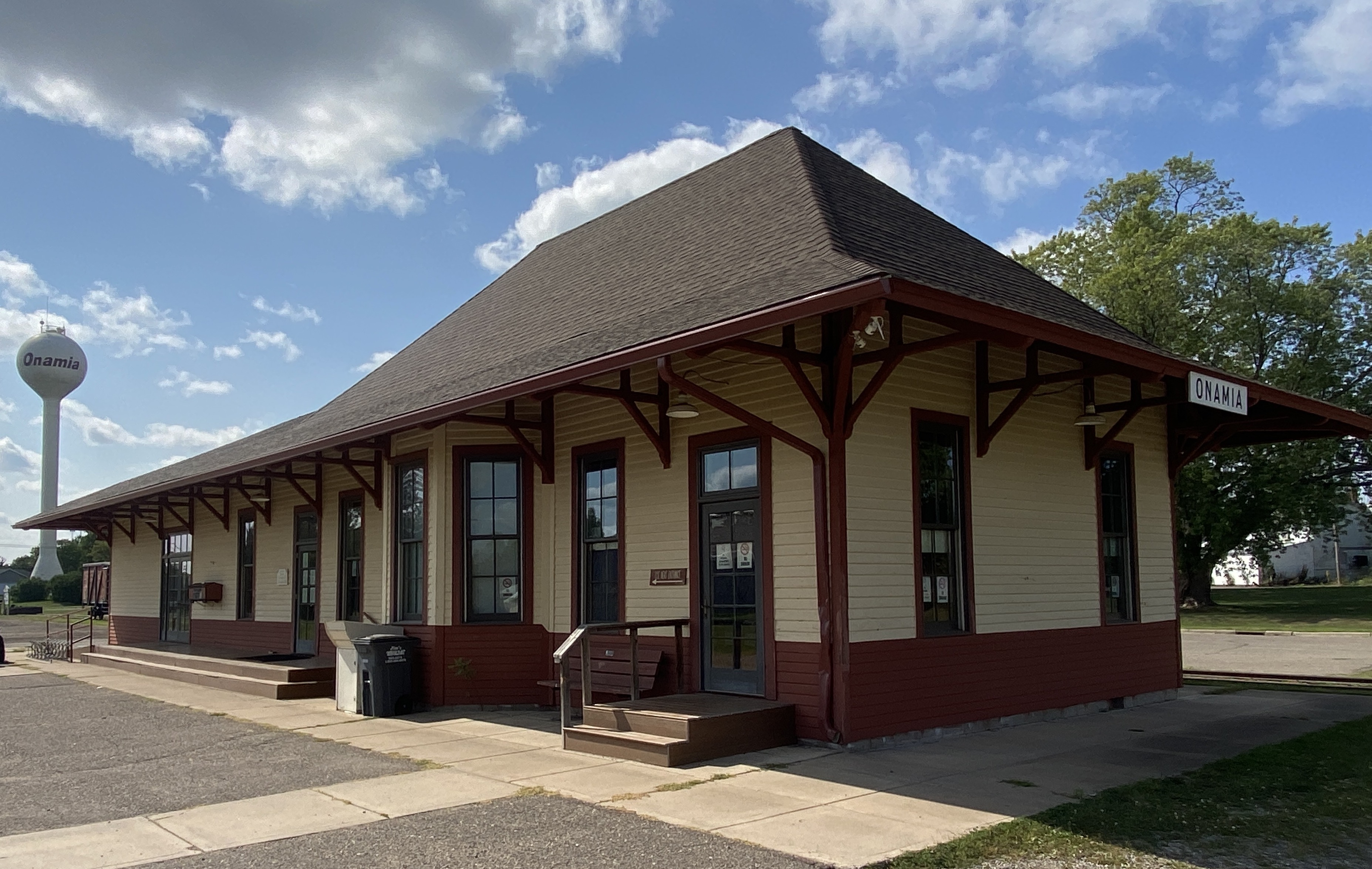
Onamia Depot Library

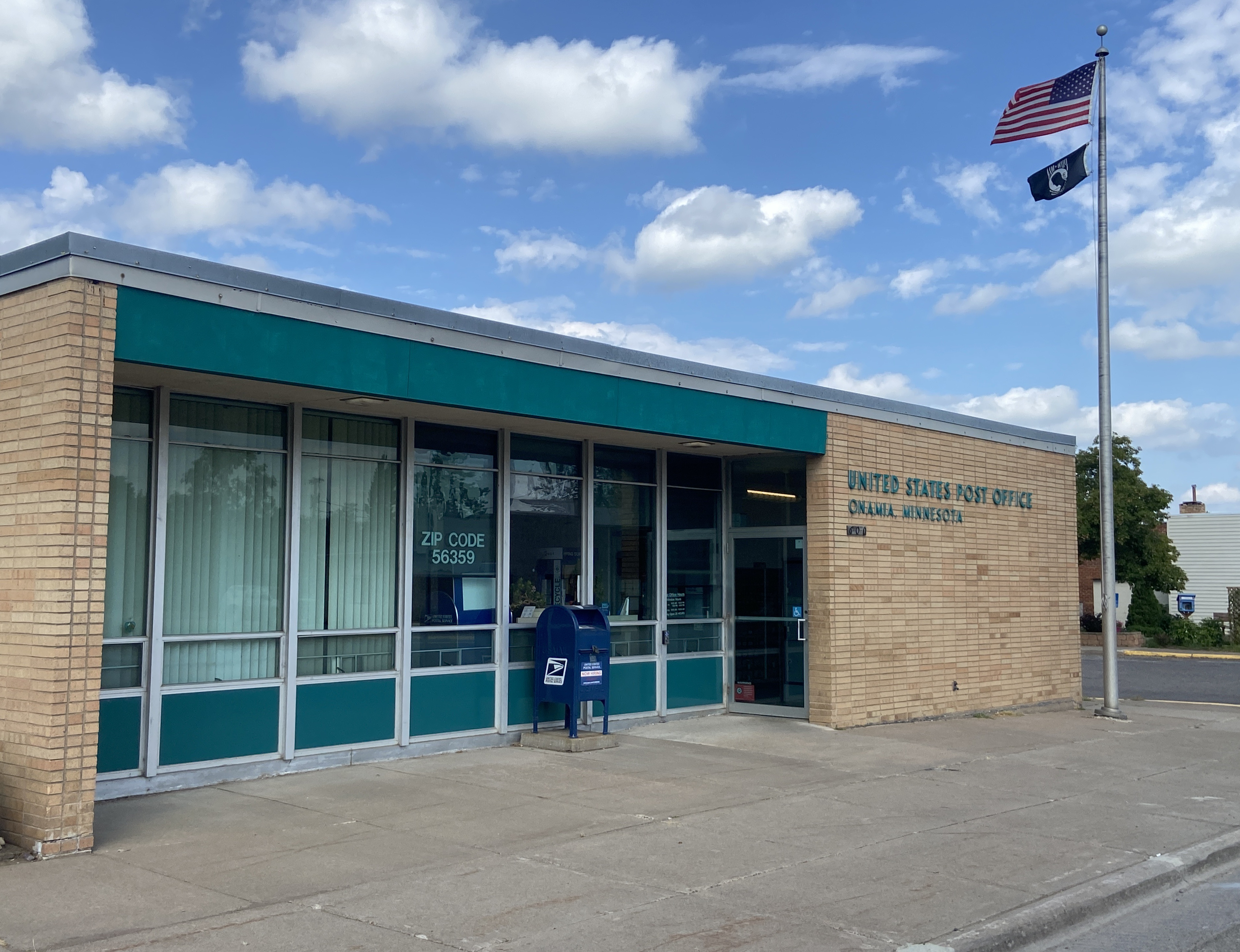
Onamia Post Office

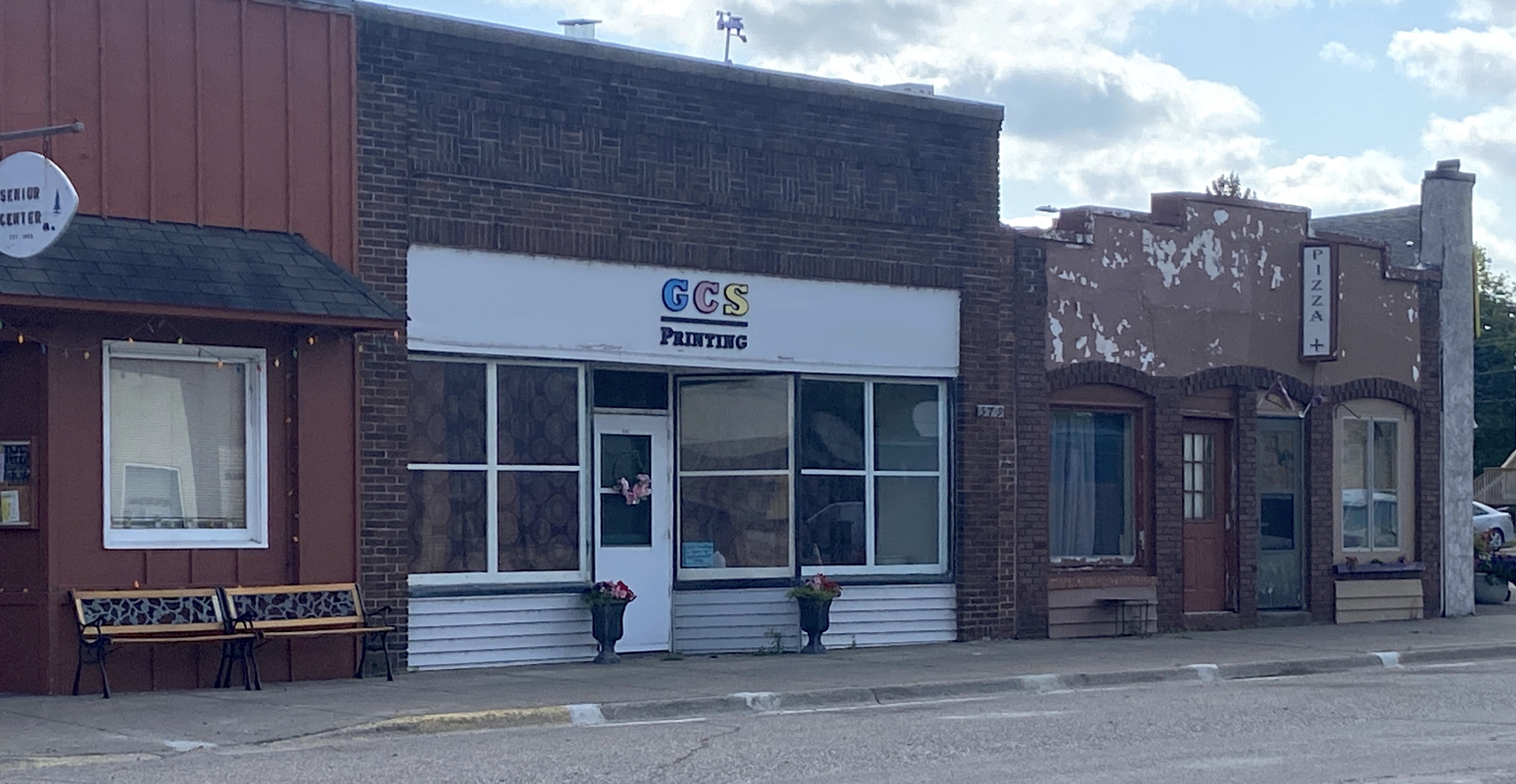
Businesses in the city

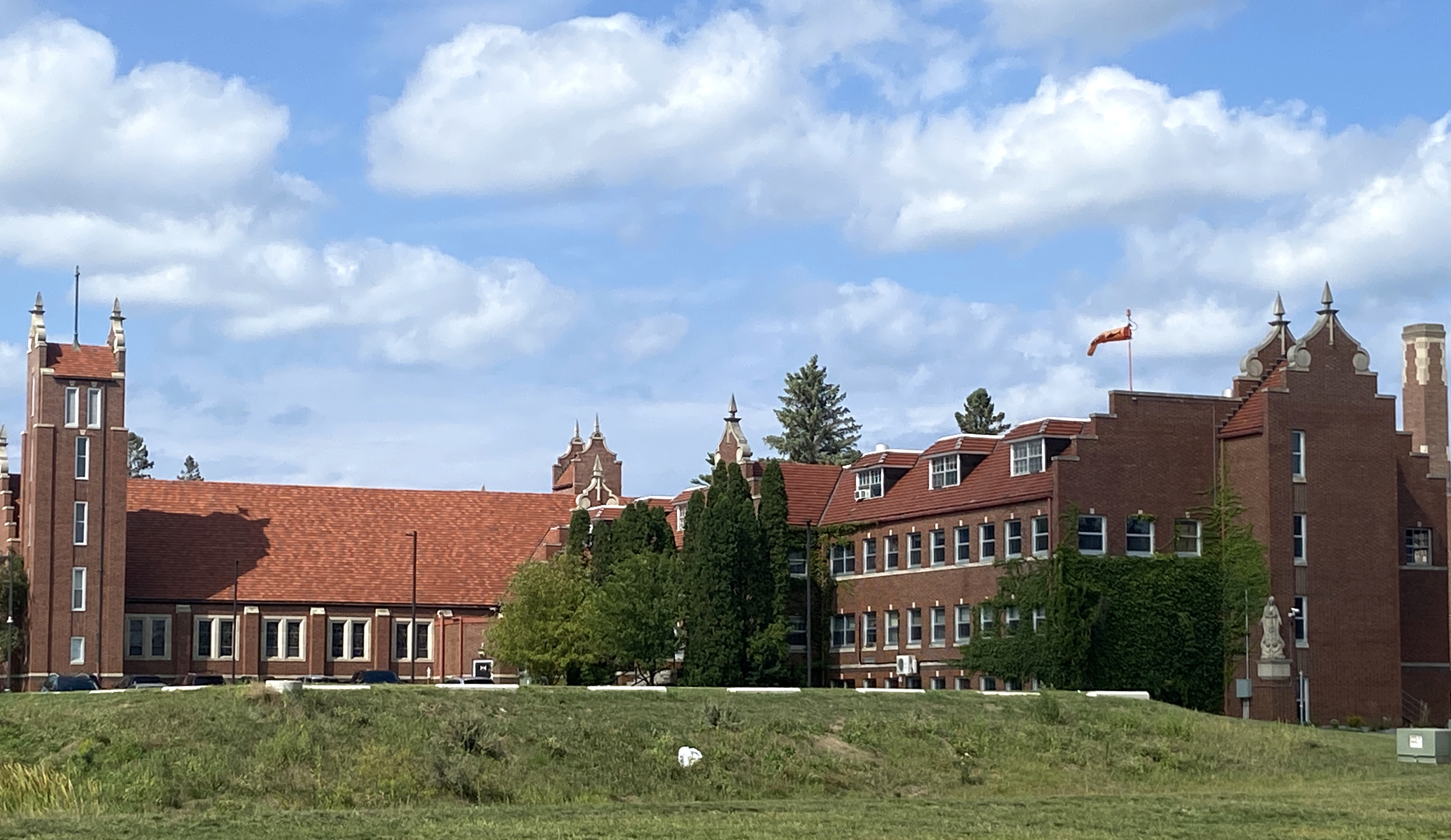
Crosier Fathers and Brothers religious community
