= List of county roads in Pine County, Minnesota =

- Standard county road marker

Highway names
- Interstates: Interstate X (I-X)
- US Highways: U.S. Highway X (US X)
- State: Trunk Highway X (MN X or TH X)
- County State-Aid Highways: County State-Aid Highway X (CSAH X)
- County Roads: County Road X (CR X)

System links
- County roads of Minnesota; Pine County

The following is an incomplete list of county-maintained roads in Pine County, Minnesota, United States.

Within Pine County, a County Road (CR) is referred to as a "Highway" if a sealed road and "Road" if an improved road. Though some of them are county state aid highways (CSAH), all Pine County roads and highways bear the black and white standard square shield for County Routes rather than having the CSAH bearing the blue and gold pentagonal M1-6 shield for those that are CSAH designated routes.

The procedure of Pine County referring to the plurality of its county routes as a county highway rather than a county road is an anomaly in Minnesota; whereas with most other counties in Minnesota, the opposite method is followed for addressing the name of a county route.

== CR 1–CR 25 ==

County Highway 1 is a discontinuous road that serves Greeley and Royalton Township. The southern segment is a continuation of Rush Lake Trail (Chisago CR 1), from the county line, generally heading northwest for approximately 1.2 miles (1.9 km) on Greeley Road through Greeley, then north for 1 mile (1.6 km) to State Highway 70 (MN 70). The northern segment of County Highway 1 resumes approximately 0.25 miles (0.40 km) east of the terminus of the southern segment on Highway 70, and heads north along Woodland Road, to the intersection with Brunswick Road (CR 5), approximately 1.1 miles (1.8 km). Woodland Road continues as County Road 115.

County Highway 2 is a road that serves Rock Creek. The road begins at the intersection of County Road 3 and County Road 104, on 560th Street, head west for 5 miles (8.0 km), terminating at State Highway 361 (MN 361). 560th Street continues west as County Road 109.

County Highway 3 is a road that serves Rock Creek and Pine City Township. The road begins at the intersection of County Road 2 and County Road 104, on Maple Avenue, head north for 2 miles (3.2 km), becoming Maple Grove Road, continuing north for 1 mile (1.6 km), head west for 0.5 miles (0.80 km) along Russell Road, and then head north for 1 mile (1.6 km) along Milburn Road, terminating at County Road 8.

County Highway 4 is a road that serves Rock Creek and Pine City Township. The road begins at State Highway 70 (MN 70), on Government Road, generally heading north for approximately 3 miles (4.8 km), terminating at County Road 8.

County Highway 5 is a road that serves Pine City Township and Royalton Township. County Highway 5 begins at the intersection of County Highway 6 and County Road 115 as a continuation of County Highway 6, continues southwest on Brunswick Road for 2.5 miles (4.0 km) to the intersection of County Road 1 and County Road 115 at Woodland Road. The road generally heads west for approximately 4 miles (6.4 km) and continues as 133rd Avenue (Kanabec CR 28).

County Highway 6 is a road that serves Pine City Township and Royalton Township. The road begins as a continuation of County Highway 5 on Brunswick Road, heads north for 1.4 miles (2.3 km) and terminates at Pokegama Lake Road (CR 7).

County Highway 7 is a road that serves Pine City, Pine City Township, Royalton Township, Pokegama Township and Grasston. The approximately 11 miles (18 km) road begins as continuation Pine Street (Kanabec CR 23) in Grasston, which becomes Pokegama Lake Road upon entering Pine County. Pokegama Lake Road generally heads east and north until reaching its intersection with Interstate Highway 35, enters Pine City as Hillside Avenue Southwest, and terminates at its intersection with Main Street (CR 61). Though the short segment of Pine Street in Grasston between the county line and State Highway 107 (MN 107) is designated as Kanabec CR 23, the sign for the short segment is that of Pine CR 7. The segment within Pine City was originally signed as former State Highway 324 (MN 324) until 2003.

County Highway 8 is a road that serves Pine City Township and Pine City. The approximately 7 miles (11 km) road begins at the intersection of Ravine Road (CR 117) and St. Croix Road (CR 118), heads west into Pine City on St. Croix Road, then on St. Croix Road Southeast, heads north on 2nd Street Southeast, heads west on 3rd Avenue Southeast, and terminating at 6th Street (CR 61).

County Highway 9 is a road that serves Pine City, Pine City Township, Chegwatana Township and Pokegama Township, Pine County, Minnesota. The road begins at St. Croix Road Southeast (CR 8) in Pine City, heads out of Pine City on East Cross Lake Road, generally heads northeast on Cross Lake Road for approximately 4.5 miles (7.2 km) along portions of former Point Douglas to Superior Military Road, then north for 2 miles (3.2 km), terminating at Beroun Crossing Road (CR 14).

County Highway 10 is a road that serves Chengwatana. The road begins at the intersection of Cross Lake Road (CR 9) and Forest Road, heads east for approximately 4.7 miles (7.6 km) on Forest Road, heads north on Evergreen Road for 3 miles (4.8 km), and terminates at its intersection with Beroun Crossing Road (CR 14 / CR 128).

County Highway 11 is a road that serves Pine City, Pokegama Township and Henriette. The road begins at the intersection of County Highway 61 and Henriette Road, heads northwest on Henriette Road for approximately 4.1 miles (6.6 km) and heads west for approximately 3.75 miles (6.04 km). The road heads south along State Highway 107 (MN 107) in Henriette, then continues west for 1 mile (1.6 km) to the county line, and continues as 195th Avenue (Kanabec CR 1).

County Road 12 is a road that serves Pokegama Township and Henriette. The road begins at the intersection of Pokegama Lake Road (CR 7) with Auburn Road, heads north on Auburn Road for 3.25 miles (5.23 km), heads west and north into Henriette, heads west on 5th Avenue Southeast, heads north on Main Street and terminates at Henriette Road (CR 11).

County Highway and Road 13 is a road that serves Pokegama Township, Brook Park Township and Brook Park. The route begins at the intersection of Pokegama Lake Road (CR 7) and Brook Park Road, generally heads north on Brook Park Road for 8 miles (13 km) into Brook Park, continues north on 3rd Street for 0.5 miles (0.80 km) and heads west for 0.5 miles (0.80 km) on 2nd Avenue. Upon leaving Brook Park, the road continues north as a County Road for 2.25 miles (3.62 km) on Brook Park Road, and then continues as Usher Street (Kanabec CR 20).

County Highway 14 is a road that serves Chengwatana Township, Munch Township, Pokegama Township, Beroun, Mission Creek Township and Brook Park Township. The road begins at the intersection of Brook Park Road (CR 13) and Beroun Crossing Road, heads east on Beroun Crossing Road for 11 miles (18 km), and terminates at the intersection of Beroun Crossing Road (CR 14 / CR 128) and Evergreen Road (CR 10).

County Highway 15 is a road that serves Munch Township, Mission Creek Township, Barry Township and Hinckley. The road begins at the intersection of Beroun Crossing Road (CR 14) with Hinckley Road, heads north on Hinckley Road for 7.3 miles (11.7 km) into Hinckley and terminates at State Highway 48 (MN 48).

County Road 16 is a road that serves Mission Creek Township. The road begins at the intersection of County Highway 61 with Cross Park Road, heads east on Cross Park Road for 2.75 miles (4.43 km), and terminates at its intersection with Hinckley Road (CR 15).

County Road and Highway 17 is a road that serves Mission Creek Township, Hinckley Township and Dell Grove Township. The southern segment of the road begins at State Highway 23 (MN 23) on Sunny Hill Road, heads north for 1.2 miles (1.9 km), heads east on Bear Road for 0.5 miles (0.80 km), heads north for 0.75 miles (1.21 km) on Fox Road. The road continues north as a County Highway for 7.75 miles (12.47 km), terminating at Grindstone Lake Road (CR 27). The northern segment begins on Grindstone Lake Road (CR 27), 0.25 miles (0.40 km) north of the terminus of the southern segment, continues north on the northern segment of Fox Road for 2.5 miles (4.0 km) before it terminates at Groningen Road (CR 28).

County Highway 18 is a road that serves Hinckley and Hinckley Township. The road begins in Hinckley at the intersection of Craig Avenue and Old Highway 61 (CR 61) with 2nd Street Northwest, heads west for 0.5 miles (0.80 km), continues west on Dahl Road to the county line. The road continues west as 300th Avenue (Kanabec CR 3).

County Road 19 is a road that serves Munch Township and Barry Township. The road begins at the intersection Wildlife Road (CR 20) with Townline Road, heads east on Townline Road for 1 mile (1.6 km), south on Kettle River Road for 0.4 miles (0.64 km), heads east on Fishtail Road for 3 miles (4.8 km), and terminates at its intersection with Cloverdale Road (CR 21).

County Road and Highway 20 is a road that serves Barry Township and Sandstone Township. The County Road begins at the intersection of Fishtail Road (CR 19) with Wildlife Road, heads north on Wildlife Road for 2 miles (3.2 km) to State Highway 48 (MN 48). The road continues north as a County Highway for 3 miles (4.8 km) before reverting to a County Road, then continues to head north for 4 miles (6.4 km), heads west for 1 mile (1.6 km) on Klejeski Road and terminates at its intersection with Prison Road (CR 29).

County Highway and Road 21 is a road that serves Crosby Township and Arlone Township. The County Highway begins at the intersection of Fishtail Road (CR 19) with Cloverdale Road, heads north on Cloverdale Road for 11.4 miles (18.3 km) to Duxbury Road (CR 30). The road continues north as a County Road for 4 miles (6.4 km) and terminates at its intersection with Rutabaga Road (CR 32).

County Highway and Road 22 is a road that serves Crosby Township, Clover Township, Danforth Township, Fleming Township, Bruno Township and Bruno. The County Highway begins at St. Croix River at the former Fleming Landing now located in St. Croix State Park, generally heads west and north on St. Croix Park Road, briefly heads east, concurrently on State Highway 48 (MN 48), continues to head generally north on Fleming Logging Road. At its intersection with Barns Spring Road, CR 22 becomes County Road 22 and continues to generally head north to Duxbury Road (CR 30), where it briefly heads west concurrently with CR 30, then heads north 4 miles (6.4 km) to Rutabaga Road (CR 32), heads west concurrently with CR 32 or 1 mile (1.6 km), heads north as County Highway 22 for 6.3 miles (10.1 km), terminating at its intersection with Main Street (CR 44).

County Highway 23 is a road that serves Rock Creek and Pine City Township. It begins as a continuation of Falcon Avenue (Chisago CR 9), heads north on Falcon Avenue, heads east on 570th Street, heads north on Fairway Road, and terminating at its intersection with Pokegama Lake Road (CR 7).

County Highway and Road 24 is a road that serves Ogema Township, Wilma Township and New Dosey Township. It begins as a County Highway at the intersection of State Highway 48 (MN 48) with Tamarack River Road, generally heads north on Tamarack River Road for 3 miles (4.8 km). Becoming County Road 24, the route continues north for 1 mile (1.6 km), heads east 1 mile (1.6 km), heads north 8 miles (13 km) and terminating at its intersection with Rutabaga Road (CR 32).

County Highway 25 is a road that serves Arna Township and Wilma Township. It begins at the Minnesota-Wisconsin border at the intersection of State Line Road with Markville Road, generally heads west and north on Markville Road, and terminates at its intersection with Tamarack River Road (CR 24).

== CR 26–CR 50 ==

County Highway and Road 26 is a road that serves Dell Grove Township and Friesland. The County Road begins as a continuation of 340th Avenue (Kanabec CR 29) when it enters Pine County as Friesland Road, heads east for 3 miles (4.8 km), becomes a County Highway, continues east for an additional 3 miles (4.8 km), terminating at its intersection with Old Highway 61 (CR 61).

County Highway 27 is a road that serves Dell Grove Township. The County Highway begins as a continuation of 355th Avenue (Kanabec CR 21) when it enters Pine County as Grindstone Lake Road, heads east for 3 miles (4.8 km), briefly heads north for 0.5 miles (0.80 km), continues to head east for another 3 miles (4.8 km), terminating at the interchange with Old Highway 61/Lake Road (CR 61) and Finlayson Road (CR 35), west of Sandstone.

County Highway 28 is a road that serves Dell Grove Township and Sandstone Township. The County Highway begins as a continuation of 380th Avenue (Kanabec CR 30) when it enters Pine County as Groningen Road, heads east for 7.5 miles (12.1 km), heads south for 1.9 miles (3.1 km), terminating at its intersection with Lake Road (CR 61), west of Sandstone.

County Highway 29 is a road that serves Sandstone Township and Sandstone. Located on the southwestern border of the city, the 1.7 miles (2.7 km) road is routed the entire length of Prison Road, connecting the Federal Correctional Institution, Sandstone, with State Highway 123 (MN 123).

County Highway 30 is a road that serves Sandstone Township, Danforth Township, Wilma Township and Duxbury. The route begins at its intersection with State Highway 123 (MN 123), heads east on Duxbury Road for 14 miles (23 km), terminating at its intersection with Tamarack River Road (CR 24). Duxbury Road continues eastward as County Road 141.

County Road 31 is a road that serves Markville, Arna Township, New Dosey Township and Cloverton. It begins at its intersection with Markville Road (CR 25), heads north for 5 miles (8.0 km) on Cloverton Road, and terminates at its intersection with Rutabaga Road (CR 32).

County Highway and Road 32 is a road that serves Askov, Partridge Township, Fleming Township, New Dosey Township and Cloverton. The County Highway begins at its intersection with State Highway 23 (MN 23), heads east on Brogade in Askov, continues to head east on Guvernors Vej, and upon leaving Askov continues to head west on Rutabaga Road until its intersection with Wolf Creek Road (CR 22 / CR 146). At this point, the road becomes a County Road, continues to head east for 14 miles (23 km), heads south for 1 mile (1.6 km) and heads east 0.75 miles (1.21 km). Upon entering Cloverton on Rutabaga Road, the road again becomes a County Highway and continues east for approximately another 2 miles (3.2 km) into Wisconsin, continuing as Douglas CR T, heading into Cozy Corner.

County Highway and Road 33 is a road that serves Askov, Partridge Township, Norman Township, Kettle River Township and Rutledge. The County Highway begins at its intersection with CR 32 in Askov, heads northeast on Brogade, heads north on H.C. Andersensalle, upon leaving Askov, continues north for 2 miles (3.2 km) on Beavertail Road, becomes a County Road, continues heading north for 2 miles (3.2 km), heads west on Swanson Road for 3 miles (4.8 km), heads generally north and west, terminating at its intersection with County Highway 61.

County Highway 34 is a road serving Finlayson, Finlayson Township, Groningen and Kettle River Township. It begins at its intersection with State Highway 18 (MN 18) in Finlayson, as a continuation of Scotch Pine Road (CR 144), heads north 4 miles (6.4 km) on Scotch Pine Road, and terminates at its intersection with Rutledge Road (CR 39). Scotch Pine Road continues north as CR 151.

County Highway 35 is a road serving Dell Grove Township, Groningen, Pine Lake Township and Finlayson. It begins at the interchange with Old Highway 61/Lake Road (CR 61) and Finlayson Road (CR 27), heads north 5.9 miles (9.5 km) on Finlayson Road, and terminates at its intersection with State Highway 18 (MN 18) in Finlayson.

County Highway 36 is a road serving Dell Grove Township and Pine Lake Township. It begins at its intersection with Groningen Road (CR 28), heads north 1.5 miles (2.4 km) on Dell Road, heads east 1 mile (1.6 km) on Korpi Road, becomes a County Highway and heads north 6 miles (9.7 km) on Norway Spruce Road, and terminates at its intersection with Rutledge Road (CR 39). Norway Spruce Road continues north as (CR 150).

County Highway 37 is a short County Highway serving Pine Lake Township. It begins at its intersection with 100th Avenue/Big Pine Road (CR 38), heads east 1.3 miles (2.1 km) on Big Pine Cutoff, and terminates with its intersection with State Highway 18 (MN 18).

County Highway 38 is a short County Highway serving Pine Lake Township in Pine County and Wagner Township in Aitkin County. The County Highway continues north for 0.5 miles (0.80 km) on 100th Avenue as a continuation of Aitkin CR 25, heads north and east 1.3 miles (2.1 km) on Big Pine Road, and terminates with its intersection with State Highway 18 (MN 18).

County Highway 39 is a County Highway serving Rutledge, Kettle River Township and Bremen Township. It begins in Rutledge at its intersection with Pine Street (CR 61), heads west 6 miles (9.7 km) on Rutledge Road, and terminates at its intersection with Norway Spruce Road (CR 36/CR 150). Norway Spruce Road continues west, but without a highway designation.

County Road and Highway 40 is a road that serves, Bremen Township and Birch Creek Township, and Denham. It begins at its intersection with Rutledge Road (CR 39), heads north for 1 mile (1.6 km) on Twin Oaks Road, heads west 0.5 miles (0.80 km) on White Spruce Road, heads north 6 miles (9.7 km) on Denham Road. Heading east 0.5 miles (0.80 km) on Soo Line Road, CR 40 becomes a County Highway and enters Denham from the west, continues to head north 2 miles (3.2 km) on Denham Road to its intersection with Farm to Market Road (CR 46), returns to being a County Road, continues north for additional 2 miles (3.2 km), and continues northward as Carlton CR 17.

County Highway and Road 41 is a road that serves Bremen Township, Kettle River Township and Willow River. The highway begins at its intersection with Cross Street (CR 61) in Willow River, generally heads west for approximately 9 miles (14 km), becomes a road and continues west for 2 miles (3.2 km), heads north on Jones Road for 1 mile (1.6 km) along the Pine and Aitkin county border. The road continues west as 220th Street (Aitkin CR 2).

County Road 42 is a road that serves Kettle River Township and Sturgeon Lake Township. The road begins at the intersection of County Road 41 and Scotch Pine Road, heads north on Scotch Pine Road for 2 miles (3.2 km), and terminates at its intersection with Denham Crossing Road (CR 52).

County Highway 43 is a road that serves Bruno, Bruno Township, Norman Township, Kettle River Township and Willow River. The Highway begins in Bruno at the intersection of Main Street with State Highway 23 (MN 23), heads west on Main Street, continues west and north for approximately 9.5 miles (15.3 km), heads west across Interstate Highway 35 and enters into Willow River. The Highway terminates at its intersection with Cross Street (CR 61).

County Road 44 is a road that serves Bruno Township. The Highway begins in Bruno at the intersection of Main Street with State Highway 23 (MN 23), heads east on Main Street, heads north on Spruce Street, heads northeast and east on Wild Haven Road for approximately 3.2 miles (5.1 km), north on Norden Road for 1 mile (1.6 km), west on Park Hills Road for 1 mile (1.6 km), and terminates at its intersection with Park Hills Road (CR 44 and CR 171) and Shady Pine Road (CR 45).

County Road 45 is a road that serves Bruno Township. The road begins at the intersection with Park Hills Road (CR 44 and CR 171) and Shady Pine Road, heads north on Shady Pine Road for 2 miles (3.2 km), and terminates at its intersection with Kerrick Road (CR 46 and CR 154).

County Highway and Road 46 is a road that serves Kerrick, Kerrick Township, Windemere Township, Sturgeon Lake, Sturgeon Lake Township and Birch Creek Township. The Highway begins at its intersection of Kerrick Road (CR 46 and CR 154) with Shady Pine Road (CR 45), heads generally west and north on Kerrick Road, through Kerrick on Main Street, continues to head north and west on Deerfield Road for approximately 7.5 miles (12.1 km), heads north on Military Road for 0.5 miles (0.80 km), generally head west on Lakeland Road for approximately 0.5 miles (0.80 km) into Sturgeon Lake and heads northwest and west to its intersection with Main Street (CR 61). Though official maps show the eastern segment terminating and the western segment resuming approximately 500 feet (150 m) south at the intersection of Main Street (CR 61) with 2nd Avenue, the signage in town indicates concurrent routing of County Highways 46 and 61 for that road segment. The western segment heads west on 2nd Avenue, heads south on Market Street, heads northwest and west on Bryan Street. Continuing out of Sturgeon Lake, county highway heads north and west for 7.5 miles (12.1 km) on Farm to Market Road, becomes a county road and continues west on Farm to Market Road for 3 miles (4.8 km) to the Pine and Aitkin county border. Upon leaving the county, the road continues as 260th Street (Aitkin CR 34).

County Highway and Road 47 is a road that serves Duquette and Kerrick Township. The county highway begins at its intersection with State Highway 23 (MN 23) and Oak Leaf Road in Duquette, heads northwest on Oak Leaf Road out of Duquette and becomes a county road. The county road continues to head west on Oak Leaf Road for 4 miles (6.4 km), where it terminates at its intersection with Willow Hay Road (CR 49). The road continues west as Oak Leaf Road (CR 162).

County Highway 48 is a road that serves Kerrick Township, Pine County and Moose Lake Township, Carlton County. The route begins at the intersection of Oak Leaf Road (CR 47) and Larson Road, heads north on Larson Road for 1.5 miles (2.4 km), heads west on Shadow Oak Road for 1 mile (1.6 km), heads north on Oak Lake Road North for 1.5 miles (2.4 km), head west on County Line Road for 3 miles (4.8 km), and terminates at the intersection of County Line Road (CR 48 / Carlton CR 10) and Willow Hay Road (CR 49) / Red Hill Road (Carlton CR 13).

County Road 49 is a road that serves Kerrick Township. The county road begins at the intersection of Deerfield Road (CR 46) with Willow Hay Road, heads north for 4 miles (6.4 km), and terminates at the intersection of County Line Road (CR 48 / Carlton CR 10) and Willow Hay Road (CR 49) / Red Hill Road (Carlton CR 13). The road continues north into Carlton County as Red Hill Road (Carlton CR 13).

County Highway 50 is a road that serves Windemere Township. The highway begins at the intersection of Lakeland Road (CR 46) and Military Road (CR 46 / CR 50), heads north on Military Road for 2 miles (3.2 km), heads west on North Shoreland Road for approximately 2.5 miles (4.0 km) and terminates at its intersection with East Frontage Road (CR 51).

== CR 51–CR 70 ==

County Highway 51 is a road that serves Windemere Township. The route begins its intersection with Lakeland Road (CR 46), heads north and northwest, paralleling Interstate Highway 35 on the east side on East Frontage Road and terminates at its intersection with County Line Road (Carlton CR 10).

County Highway and Road 52 is a road that serves Sturgeon Lake Township, Birch Creek Township and Denham. The route begins at the intersection of Old Highway 61 (CR 61) with Denham Crossing Road, generally heads west for 4 miles (6.4 km) on Denham Crossing Road into Denham, heads north on Ballfield Road, heads west on Old Creamery Road, heads north on Edgewood Road, heads west on Birch Valley Road, and terminates at its intersection with Denham Road (CR 40).

County Highway 53 is a road that serves Pokegama Township. The route begins at the intersection of Pokegama Lake Road (CR 7) and Tigua Road, generally heads north and east on Tigua Road, and terminates at its intersection with Henriette Road (CR 11).

County Highway 54 is a road that serves Mission Creek Township. The route begins at the intersection of Beroun Crossing Road (CR 14) with Frontage Road, heads north on Frontage Road as it parallels on the west side of Interstate Highway 35, heads west on Two Creek Road, heads north on Wildwood Road, and terminates at its intersection with State Highway 23 (MN 23) between Brook Park and Hinckley.

County Highway 55 is a road that serves Pine City and Pokegama Township. The route begins on the north end of Pine City, at the intersection of 6th Street (CR 61) with Airport Road, heads east on Airport Road Northeast, heads north on Airwaves Road Northeast, heads east on Visions Road Northeast, heads north on Crossway Road Northeast, heads west on Everready Road, and terminates at its intersection with County Highway 61.

County Highway 56 is a road that serves Kerrick Township. The route begins at the intersection of Deerfield Road (CR 46) and Oake Lake Road South, heads north on Oak Lake Road South for 2 miles (3.2 km), and terminates at its intersection with Oak Leaf Road (CR 47).

County Highway 60 is a road that serves Finlayson. The route begins at the intersection of State Highway 18 (MN 18) with Broadway Street, heads south 1 block on South Broadway Street, heads east 2 blocks on Finland Avenue, heads north 1 block on Front Street and terminates at its intersection with MN 18.

County Highway 61 is a road that serves through Pine County, roughly paralleling Interstate Highway 35. The roadway is part of the former alignment of U.S. 61, and the stretch of the road between Rock Creek and Pine City was designated as part of State Highway 361 (MN 361) until it was turned back to Pine County maintenance in 2003. The approximately 50 miles (80 km) long road begins at State Highway 70 (MN 70) as a continuation of Highway 361 on Forest Boulevard in Rock Creek, heads north through Pine City Township on County Highway 61 and Pine City on Main Street, Pokegama Township, Beroun and Mission Creek Township on County Highway 61, briefly heads west across the Interstate Highway 35 while running concurrently with State Highway 23 (MN 23), and then continues north on Old Highway 61 through Hinckley Township and Hinckley. County Highway 61 continues north along Old Highway 61 through Barry Township, Dell Grove Township, then heads east on Lake Road through Sandstone Township, terminating at its intersection with Interstate 35 and MN 23. County Highway 61 continues north in Finlayson Township at its intersection with State Highway 18 (MN 18), east of Finlayson, passes through Rutledge, Kettle River Township, Willow River, Sturgeon Lake Township, Sturgeon Lake and Windemere Township. Pine County Highway 61 continues northward as Carlton County Road 61.

In Hinckley, County Highway 61 Spur, designated as a branch of CSAH 61 along Fire Monument Road, also exists, connecting the terminus of State Highway 48 (MN 48) at Interstate 35 with Old Highway 61 (CR 61).

County Highway 62 is a road that serves Hinckley. The route begins at the intersection of Monument Road (CR 61) and Lawler Avenue North, heads north on Lawler Avenue North for 7.5 blocks, and terminates at its intersection with Old Highway 61 (CR 61).

County Highway 63 is a road that serves Brook Park. The route begins at the intersection of 3rd Street (CR 13) with 2nd Avenue (CR 13 / CR 131), heads north for 2 blocks on 3rd Street, and terminates at its intersection with State Highway 23 (MN 23).

County Highway 64 is a road that serves Sandstone. The route begins at the intersection of Main Street / State Highway 123 (MN 123) and 3rd Street / Highway 123, heads north on Main Street for 5 blocks, and terminates at its intersection with Oak Street / Highway 23 (MN 23), Lark Street and Railroad Avenue / Highway 23.

County Highway 65 is a road that serves Pine City. The route begins at the intersection of Main Street (CR 61) and 8th Avenue, heads east on East 8th Avenue for 3 blocks, and terminates at its intersection with 2nd Street (CR 8).

County Highway 66 is a road that serves Askov. The route begins at the intersection of Brogade (CR 33) and Andersensalle (CR 33), heads northeast on Brogade for 1 block, heads north for 2 blocks on Købmagergade and terminates at its intersection with State Highway 23 (MN 23).

County Highway 67 is a road that serves Pokegama Township. The road begins at the intersection of Cross Lake Road (CR 9) and Holly Road, heads west 1 mile (1.6 km) on Holly Road, south 0.5 miles (0.80 km) on Vintage Road, west 0.5 miles (0.80 km) on Everready Road, terminates at the intersection of Crossway Road (CR 55) and Everready Road (CR 55). Prior to 2022, the road was signed as County Road 125.

County Highway 70 is a road that serves Rock Creek. The route begins at the intersection of Forest Boulevard (CR 61) and 570th Street, heads east for 0.5 miles (0.80 km) on 570th Street, and terminates at MN 70. Prior to 2018, the road was signed as County Road 110.

== CR 101–CR 125 ==

County Road 101 is a road that serves Royalton Township. The route begins as a continuation of 421st Avenue Northeast (Isanti CR 54) when the road becomes 540th Street, heads east 0.9 miles (1.4 km), then heads north 3.25 miles (5.23 km) along Red Oak Road. The route terminates at the intersection of Red Oak Road with Brunswick Road (CR 5).

County Road 102 is a road that serves Royalton Township and Greeley. The route begins at the intersection of Clint Road with Red Oak Road (CR 101), heads east 2.75 miles (4.43 km) along Clint Road, through Greeley along Greeley Loop, then southeast concurrently on Greeley Road (CR 1), continuing east 1.75 miles (2.82 km) along Farming Road, and terminating with its intersection with Elmcrest Avenue (CR 103).

County Road 103 is a road that serves Royalton Township, West Rock and Rock Creek. The route begins at the intersection of 540th Street with Elmcrest Avenue, heads north 4 miles (6.4 km) along Elmcrest Avenue, east 0.25 miles (0.40 km) along 580th Street, north 0.25 miles (0.40 km) along Ruby Road and terminates at its intersection with Pearl Avenue (CR 115). Ruby Road continues north as County Road 115.

County Road 104 is a road that serves Rock Creek in two discontinuous segments. The western segment begins at the intersection of 550th Street with Elmcrest Avenue (CR 103), heads east for 1 mile (1.6 km) along 550th Street, and terminates with its intersection with Falcon Avenue (CR 23). The eastern segment begins 2 miles (3.2 km) east at the intersection of 550th Street with Forest Boulevard (CR 61), heads east 5 miles (8.0 km) along 550th Street, heads north 1 mile (1.6 km) along Maple Avenue, and terminates at its intersection with 560th Street (CR 2). Maple Avenue continues as County Highway 3.

County Road 105 is a road that serves Rock Creek and Rushseba Township. The route begins at Forest Boulevard (Chisago CR 30 / Pine CR 61) heads east along 540th Street for approximately 2 miles (3.2 km) and terminates Ivy Avenue.

County Road 106 is a road that serves Rock Creek in two discontinuous segments. The southern segment begins at 540th Street (CR 105) as a continuation of Government Road from Chisago County, heads north approximately 2 miles (3.2 km) along Government Road to 560th Street (CR 2). Northern segment begins approximately 600 ft (200m) to the east on 560th Street, heads north for approximately 1 mile (1.6 km) and terminates at MN 70. Government Road continues north as County Highway 4.

County Road 107 is a road that serves Rock Creek in two discontinuous segments. The southern segment begins at Forest Boulevard (CR 61) near its intersection with 560th Street (CR 2) and heads north along Freedom Avenue to Rock Creek. The northern segment continues across Rock Creek and continues north along Freedom Avenue, and terminates at MN 70. The two short segments run approximately 0.5 miles (0.80 km) in total.

County Road 108 is a road that serves Rock Creek. The route begins at 560th Street (CR 109), heads north for 0.5 miles (0.80 km) and terminates at MN 70.

County Road 109 is a road that serves Rock Creek in two discontinuous segments. The western segment begins at Elmcrest Avenue (CR 103) as Butterfly Road becomes 560th Street, heads east 1 mile (1.6 km) and terminates at Falcon Avenue (CR 23). The eastern segment begins at the continuation of 560th Street on the east side of Interstate 35, heads east for approximately 1.5 miles (2.4 km), and terminates at Forest Boulevard (CR 61).

County Road 111 is a road that serves Royalton Township. The route begins at MN 70, heads north 1.5 miles (2.4 km) along Royalton Road, and terminates at Brunswick Road (CR 5).

County Road 112 is a road that serves Royalton Township, Pine County and Grass Lake Township, Kanabec County. The route begins at MN 70, heads north 2 miles (3.2 km) along Sherwood Street, and terminates at the Snake River.

County Road 114 is a road that serves Royalton Township. The route begins at Pokegama Lake Road (CR 7), heads east 1 mile (1.6 km) along Canary Road, then heads north 1.5 miles (2.4 km) along Harvest Road, and terminates at Pokegama Lake Road (CR 7).

County Road 115 is a road that serves Royalton Township and Pine City Township. The route begins at Brunswick Road (CR 5) as a continuation of Woodland Road (CR 1), heads north approximately 1.5 miles (2.4 km) along Woodland Road, heads east 2.5 miles (4.0 km) along Wildflower Road, continues east for 0.5 miles (0.80 km) along Pearl Avenue, heads north 0.5 miles (0.80 km) along Ruby Road, heads east 0.5 miles (0.80 km) on Diamond Road, heads north 0.25 miles (0.40 km) along Emerald Road, heads east 0.5 miles (0.80 km) along Gold Road, and terminates at Fairway Road (CR 23). Prior to 2018, the section of road from Pearl Avenue to its terminus at Fairway Road was signed as County Road 5.

County Road 117 is a road that serves Pine City Township. The route begins at the intersection of Main Street South (CR 61) and Liberty Road Southeast, heads east 2 miles (3.2 km) along Liberty Road Southeast, heads north 0.5 miles (0.80 km) on Government Road concurrently with County Road 4, heads east 3 miles (4.8 km) on Russell Road, continues east 0.5 miles (0.80 km) on Russell Road concurrently with County Road 3, continues east 1 mile (1.6 km) on Russell Road, heads north 1 mile (1.6 km) on Ravine Road, and terminates at its intersection with St. Croix Road (CR 8 and CR 118).

County Road 118 is a road that serves Pine City Township. The route begins at the intersection of Ravine Road (CR 117) and St. Croix Road (CR 8), heads east on St. Croix Road for approximately 3.5 miles (5.6 km), heads north 0.5 miles (0.80 km), heads east and terminates at the St. Croix River.

County Road 119 is a road that serves Pine City Township. The route begins at the intersection of Emerald Road and Gold Road (CR 115), heads north 0.75 miles (1.21 km) on Emerald Road, and terminates at Pokegama Lake Road (CR 7).

County Road 120 is a road that serves Grass Lake Township and Comfort Township in Kanabec County, and Royalton Township and Pokegama Township in Pine County. The route begins at the intersection of 155th Avenue (Kanabec CR 66) and Sherwood Street, heads north 4.5 miles (7.2 km) on Sherwood Street. The route continues on Sherwood Street as Kanabec County Road 68.

County Road 122 is a road that serves Pokegama Township in Pine County. The route begins at the intersection of Town Hall Road with Tigua Road (CR 53), heads west 0.3 miles (0.48 km) on Town Hall Road, then continues north 1.4 miles (2.3 km) on Town Hall Road, and terminates at Henriette Road (CR 11).

County Road 124 is a road that serves Chengwatana Township in Pine County. The route begins at the intersection of Crooked River Road with Cross Lake Road (CR 9), heads east 0.8 miles (1.3 km) on Crooked River Road, heads north 1.9 miles (3.1 km) on Alabaster Road, and terminates at Cross Lake Road (CR 9).

== CR 126–CR 150 ==
County Road 126 is a road that serves Pokegama Township, Brook Park Township, and Brook Park in Pine County. The route begins at the intersection of Cluster Road with Henriette Road (CR 11), heads north 1.25 miles (2.01 km) on Cluster Road, then east 0.5 miles (0.80 km) on Sod Road, then north 2 miles (3.2 km) on Monument Road, then continues east 0.5 miles (0.80 km) on Monument Road, then continues north 1.8 miles (2.9 km) on Monument Road, and terminates at Minnesota State Highway 23.

County Road 127 is a road that serves Mission Creek Township and Beroun in Pine County. The route begins at the intersection of Red Robin Road with Beroun Crossing Road (CR 14), heads north 0.4 miles (0.64 km) on Red Robin Road, then west 0.2 miles (0.32 km) on Beroun Avenue, and terminates at County Highway 61.

County Road 129 is a road that serves Munch Township and Barry Township in Pine County. The route begins at the intersection of Cedar Creek Road and Beroun Crossing Road (CR 14), heads north 5.4 miles (8.7 km) on Cedar Creek Road, then heads west 1 mile (1.6 km) on Pelkey Creek Road, and terminates at Hinckley Road (CR 15).

County Road 130 is a road that serves Brook Park Township and Mission Creek Township in Pine County. The western segment of the route begins at the intersection of Rice Road and Brook Park Road (CR 13), heads west 5.4 miles (8.7 km) on Rice Road, heads south 1 mile (1.6 km) on Beach Road, heads east 2 miles (3.2 km) on Two Creek Road, and terminates at the intersection with Wildwood Road (CR 54). The eastern segment begins 0.7 miles (1.1 km) east of the terminus of the western segment at the start of Blueberry Island Road, heads east 2.3 miles (3.7 km) on Blueberry Island Road, heads north 1 mile (1.6 km) on Cross Lake Road, heads east 1 mile (1.6 km) on Rice Road, and terminates at its intersection with Hinckley Road (CR 15).

County Highway and Road 131 is a road that serves Brook Park, Brook Park Township and Mission Creek Township in Pine County. The western segment of the route as a highway begins as a continuation of 250th Avenue (Kanabec CR 86) at its intersection with Sherwood Street (Kanabec CR 66), heads east 3 miles (4.8 km) on Mallard Road to the intersection of Brook Park Road (CR 13) on the western edge of City of Brook Park. The eastern segment as a road begins 0.5 miles (0.80 km) east of the terminus of the western segment at the intersection of 2nd Avenue (CR 13) with 3rd Street (CR 13 and CR 63), heads east 0.5 miles (0.80 km) on 2nd Avenue, continues east 4 miles (6.4 km) on Mallard Road, and terminates at its intersection with Wildwood Road (CR 54).

County Road and Highway 133 is a road that serves Hinckley Township, Hinckley, and Barry Township in Pine County. The western segment of the route begins at the intersection of Two Rivers Road and Von Road, heads east 1.2 miles (1.9 km) on Von Road, and terminates at its intersection with Old Highway 61 (CR 61). The eastern segment begins 1.3 miles (2.1 km) to the southeast of the terminus of the western segment, at the intersection of Bear Road with Red Pine Road, generally heads north 1.1 miles (1.8 km) on Red Pine Road, heads east 0.3 miles (0.48 km) on Sikkink Road to its intersection with Morris Avenue South (CR 134), continues east on Sikkink Road as a highway for 1.3 miles (2.1 km), and terminates at its intersection with Hinckley Road (CR 15).

County Road 134 is a highway that serves Hinckley, and Barry Township in Pine County. The route begins at the intersection of Morris Avenue South and Sikkink Road (CR 133), heads generally north 1.1 miles (1.8 km) on Morris Avenue South, and terminates at its intersection with Fire Monument Road (MN 48).

County Road 136 is a route that serves Arlone Township and Crosby Township in Pine County. The route begins at the intersection of Cloverdale Road (CR 21) and Sand River Road, and heads east 3 miles (4.8 km) on Sand River Road. Sand River Road not as a County Road continues east 3 miles (4.8 km) and terminates at its intersection with St Croix Park Road (CR 22).
