= Willow River (Kettle River tributary) =

- Mouth of the Willow River

Location
- Country: United States
- State: Minnesota
- County: Pine County

Physical characteristics
- Source
  - coordinates: 46.3649439°N 92.4738062°W
- Mouth
  - coordinates: 46.3197°N 92.8466°W
- Length: 31.4 mi-long (50.5 km)

Basin features
- River system: Kettle River

The Willow River is a 31.4-mile-long (50.5 km) tributary of the Kettle River in eastern Minnesota in the United States. It is one of three rivers by that name in Minnesota. Via the Kettle and St. Croix rivers, it is part of the watershed of the Mississippi River.

== Description ==
The Willow River flows for its entire length in northern Pine County. It rises in the Nemadji State Forest in Nickerson Township and flows generally westwardly through Kerrick, Windemere, Norman and Kettle River townships, past Duquette. In Windemere Township it collects the Little Willow River, which rises at the town of Kerrick and flows 9.7 miles (15.6 km) through Bruno and Norman townships. The Willow joins the Kettle River at the town of Willow River.

== See also ==
- List of Minnesota rivers
- List of longest streams of Minnesota
