= Pokegama, Minnesota =

Pokegama Bakegamaang
- Unincorporated community
- Location within Minnesota Location within the United States
- Coordinates: 45°49′18″N 93°02′54″W
- Country: United States
- State: Minnesota
- County: Pine
- Township: Pokegama Township
- Elevation: 932 ft (284 m)

Population
  - Total: 70
- Time zone: UTC-6 (Central (CST))
  - Summer (DST): UTC-5 (CDT)
- ZIP code: 55030 and 55063
- Area code: 320
- GNIS feature ID: 649613

Pokegama (/pəˈkɛɡɒˌmɑː/) is an unincorporated community in Pokegama Township, Pine County, Minnesota, United States; along the southern shores of Pokegama Lake. Its name in Ojibwe is Bakegamaang, meaning "at the side-lake", referring to Pokegama Lake's position to the Snake River.

The community is located between Pine City and Henriette along Pokegama Lake Road (County Road 7), between Brook Park Road (County Road 13) and Tigua Road (County Road 53).

== History ==
Originally an Ojibwa village, Pokegama housed a Presbyterian Mission ran by Frederick Ayer, claiming to print the first Christian Bible in the Ojibwe language in Minnesota.

The Great Hinckley Fire of 1894 destroyed the small community of Pokegama materially and killed 28 of its people.

The Pokegama Sanatorium for tuberculosis operated on the south side of Pokegama Lake from 1905 to 1944.

The 'city' of Brook Park, 7 miles to the north, is the historical successor of the old town of Pokegama.
