= Mission Creek, Minnesota =

Mission Creek
- Unincorporated community
- Location within Minnesota Location within the United States
- Coordinates: 45°58′13″N 92°57′00″W
- Country: United States
- State: Minnesota
- County: Pine
- Township: Mission Creek Township
- Elevation: 1,001 ft (305 m)
- Time zone: UTC-6 (Central (CST))
  - Summer (DST): UTC-5 (CDT)
- ZIP code: 55037 and 55007
- Area code: 320
- GNIS feature ID: 654834

Mission Creek is an unincorporated community in Mission Creek Township, Pine County, Minnesota, United States.

The community is located between Hinckley and Beroun along Pine County 61.

The center of Mission Creek is generally considered at the junction of Pine County 61 with Tie Road, and Railroad Lane; located in the northern portion of Mission Creek Township (population 635). Mission Creek flows through the area.

Nearby places include Hinckley, Beroun, and Brook Park. Mission Creek is located three miles south of Hinckley and five miles north of Beroun. Mission Creek is six miles east-northeast of Brook Park.

Also nearby is the junction of Interstate 35, State Highway 23 (MN 23), and Pine County 61; just south of Hinckley at the Mora exit.

ZIP codes 55037 (Hinckley) and 55007 (Brook Park) meet near Mission Creek.

== See also ==
- Mission Creek Township
