= Moose Lake Township, Carlton County, Minnesota =

Moose Lake Township, Minnesota
- Township
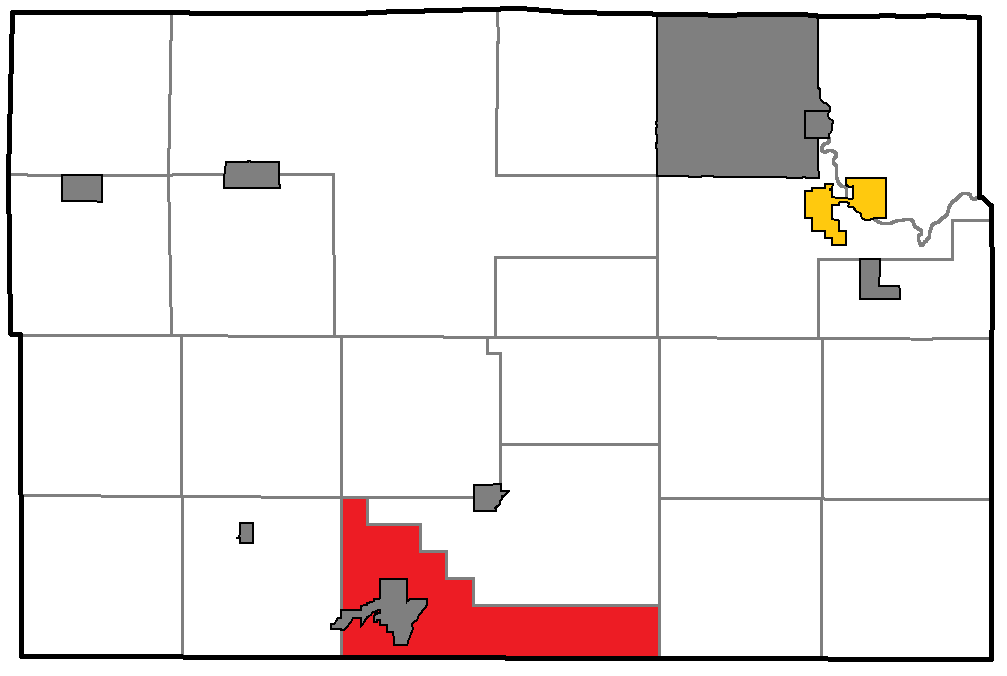
- Location of Moose Lake Township within Carlton County, Minnesota
- Coordinates: 46°26′50″N 92°44′37″W
- Country: United States
- State: Minnesota
- County: Carlton

Area
  - Total: 33.5 sq mi (86.8 km^{2})
  - Land: 32.7 sq mi (84.7 km^{2})
  - Water: 0.81 sq mi (2.1 km^{2})
- Elevation: 1,066 ft (325 m)

Population (2020)
  - Total: 988
  - Density: 30.2/sq mi (11.7/km^{2})
- Time zone: UTC-6 (Central (CST))
  - Summer (DST): UTC-5 (CDT)
- ZIP code: 55767
- Area code: 218
- FIPS code: 27-43972
- GNIS feature ID: 0665025
- Website: https://mooselaketownshipmn.org/

Moose Lake Township is a township in Carlton County, Minnesota, United States. The population was 988 as of the 2020 census. Moose Lake Township was named from Moose Lake and Moose Head Lake.

== Geography ==
According to the United States Census Bureau, the township has a total area of 33.5 square miles (86.8 km^{2}), of which 32.7 square miles (84.7 km^{2}) is land and 0.8 square miles (2.1 km^{2}) (2.42%) is water.

The city of Moose Lake is located entirely within Moose Lake Township geographically but is a separate entity.

=== Major highways ===
- Interstate 35
- Minnesota State Highway 27
- Minnesota State Highway 73

=== Lakes ===
- Coffee Lake
- Cranberry Lake (southeast three-quarters)
- Echo Lake
- Moose Head Lake (east edge)
- Moose Lake
- Sand Lake
- Spring Lake

=== Adjacent townships ===
- Skelton Township (north)
- Barnum Township (northeast)
- Nickerson Township, Pine County (east)
- Kerrick Township, Pine County (southeast)
- Sturgeon Lake Township, Pine County (southwest)
- Windemere Township, Pine County (southwest)
- Silver Township (west)
- Kalevala Township (northwest)

=== Cemeteries ===
The township contains Riverside Cemetery.

== Demographics ==
As of the census of 2000, there were 956 people, 366 households, and 284 families residing in the township. The population density was 29.2 inhabitants per square mile (11.3/km^{2}). There were 450 housing units at an average density of 13.8/sq mi (5.3/km^{2}). The racial makeup of the township was 98.64% White, 0.42% Native American, 0.10% Asian, 0.42% from other races, and 0.42% from two or more races. Hispanic or Latino of any race were 0.63% of the population. 22.7% were of German, 17.4% Swedish, 13.3% Norwegian, 10.9% Finnish, 7.3% Polish, 5.8% American and 5.0% Irish ancestry according to Census 2000.

There were 366 households, out of which 32.0% had children under the age of 18 living with them, 66.7% were married couples living together, 7.1% had a female householder with no husband present, and 22.4% were non-families. 18.9% of all households were made up of individuals, and 5.2% had someone living alone who was 65 years of age or older. The average household size was 2.60 and the average family size was 2.95.

In the township the population was spread out, with 27.1% under the age of 18, 4.3% from 18 to 24, 26.5% from 25 to 44, 26.2% from 45 to 64, and 16.0% who were 65 years of age or older. The median age was 41 years. For every 100 females, there were 101.7 males. For every 100 females age 18 and over, there were 96.9 males.

The median income for a household in the township was $42,946, and the median income for a family was $48,750. Males had a median income of $32,452 versus $26,389 for females. The per capita income for the township was $17,505. About 3.4% of families and 6.3% of the population were below the poverty line, including 7.2% of those under age 18 and 5.1% of those age 65 or over.
