= Brook Park =

Brook Park may refer to a location in the United States:

- Brook Park, Minnesota
- Brook Park Township, Pine County, Minnesota
- Brook Park, Ohio

== See also ==
- Brooks Park, a softball facility in Pennsylvania
