= Chengwatana, Minnesota =

Ghost town in Pine County, Minnesota, US

Chengwatana
- Ghost town
- Location within Minnesota Location within the United States
- Coordinates: 45°50′19″N 92°56′15″W
- Country: United States
- State: Minnesota
- County: Pine
- Time zone: UTC-6 (Central (CST))
  - Summer (DST): UTC-5 (CDT)
- Area code: 320
- GNIS feature ID: 649445

Chengwatana is an abandoned village site in Pine County, Minnesota, United States.

The former village was located immediately east of Pine City. The center of the village was generally considered near the present day intersection of Cross Lake Road (Pine County 9) and Government Road.

== History ==
Chengwatana was an Ojibwa village, located along the lower course of the Snake River, Minnesota. Its name in Ojibwe was Zhingwaadena, a contraction of Zhingwaak-oodena or "White-Pine Town"; English uses the French transcription of the Ojibwe. After statehood of Wisconsin in 1848, the transient village became a permanent village located at the outlet of Cross Lake, on its south eastern shore, at the beginning of the lower course of the Snake River, named Snake River Dam. Elam Greeley, a lumberman, co-founder of Stillwater, and member of the Minnesota Territorial Legislature whom Greeley is named after, owned the Chengwatana toll dam at the outlet of Cross Lake.

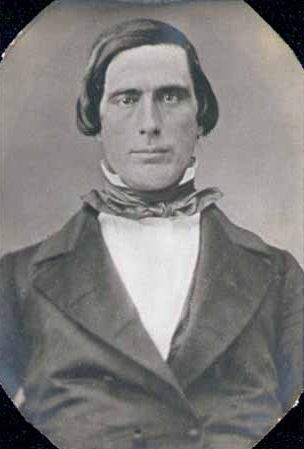
Elam Greeley

On March 1, 1856, with very informal ceremony, the village was officially named as the County Seat of Pine County and the village was renamed Alhambra by Judd, Walker and Company and Daniel G. Robertson; however, this name was not very well accepted. In 1857, Alhambra was renamed as Chengwatana. When the Point Douglas to Superior Military Road, also known as "Douglas Highway," was constructed between the modern cities of Hastings, Minnesota and Superior, Wisconsin to replace the Kettle River Trail that connected the modern cities of Fridley, Minnesota with Moose Lake, Minnesota, the new road was designed to pass through Chengwatana. The village was garrisoned as a frontier military post, 1862-1863. A post office operated in the village until 1873.

When the railroad was constructed on the western shore of Cross Lake, a new village, Pine City, was platted — Pine City's name being a loose English translation of Chengwatana. In addition, Chengwatana and Pine City Townships were also named after the village of Chengwatana. With the railroad, Chengwatana declined into a ghost town. The county seat was transferred to Pine City in 1870.

A historical marker was placed at the former village site, simply stating its location, while a detailed historical marker noting Chengwatana and its relationship to the city of Pine City was placed along the railroad bridge crossing the Snake River in Pine City.
