= Hinckley Township =

Hinckley Township may refer to the following townships in the United States:

- Hinckley Township, Medina County, Ohio
- Hinckley Township, Pine County, Minnesota
