= Fleming Township, Minnesota =

Fleming Township is the name of some places in the U.S. state of Minnesota:

- Fleming Township, Aitkin County, Minnesota
- Fleming Township, Pine County, Minnesota
