= Crosby Township =

Crosby Township may refer to the following townships in the United States:

- Crosby Township, Pine County, Minnesota
- Crosby Township, Ohio
