= Bremen Township =

Bremen Township may refer to:

- Bremen Township, Cook County, Illinois
- Bremen Township, Delaware County, Iowa
- Bremen Township, Pine County, Minnesota
