= Sandstone Township =

Sandstone Township may refer to the following places in the United States:

- Sandstone Township, Jackson County, Michigan
- Sandstone Township, Pine County, Minnesota
