= Duquette, Minnesota =

Duquette
- Unincorporated community
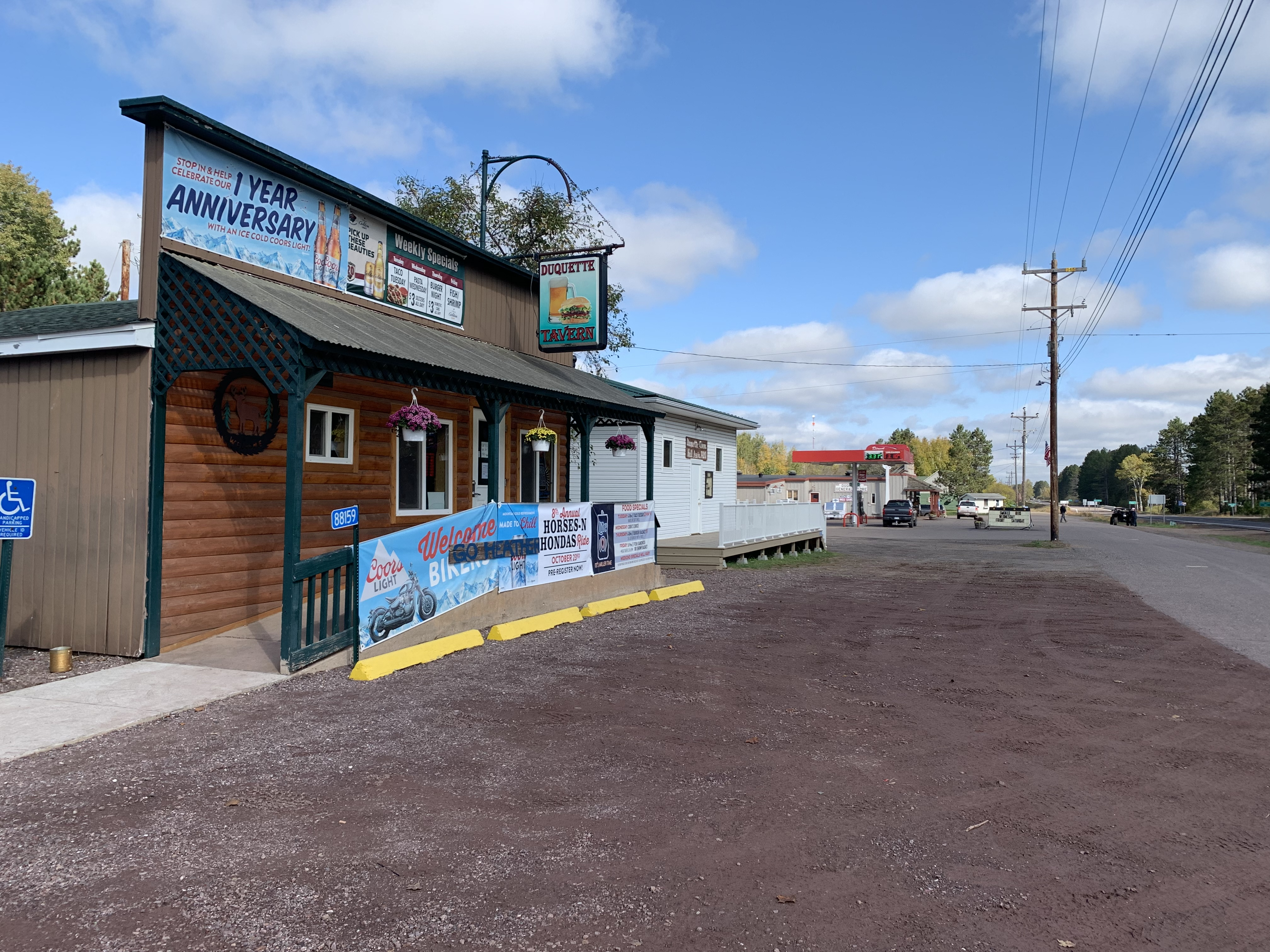
- Duquette Tavern along MN 23

- Location within Minnesota Location within the United States
- Coordinates: 46°22′11″N 92°33′12″W
- Country: United States
- State: Minnesota
- County: Pine
- Township: Kerrick Township and Nickerson Township
- Elevation: 1,145 ft (349 m)

Population
  - Total: 70
- Time zone: UTC-6 (Central (CST))
  - Summer (DST): UTC-5 (CDT)
- ZIP code: 55756 or 55712
- Area code: 218
- GNIS feature ID: 642988

Duquette is an unincorporated community in Pine County, Minnesota, United States; located along the Willow River.

State Highway 23 (MN 23) serves as a main route in the community. The Nemadji State Forest is nearby.

Duquette is located along the boundary line between Kerrick Township and Nickerson Township. The communities of Nickerson, Kerrick, and Holyoke are all near Duquette.

The small town of Duquette was named after Frank Duquette. Frank Duquette was head post master at the Moose Lake post office, then went on to start up his own post office in Duquette.

== Community ==
Duquette is an unincorporated community in northern Pine County. Nearby is the Duquette Airport, a private, 1/4 mile grass airstrip.

Duquette is the home of Jackie Berger Park; which includes campsites, ballfield, pavilion, tennis court, and fishing in the Willow River. The park was named after a local young man who died on Omaha Beach on D-Day, 1944. A parking field for snowmobiles, offroad motorcycles or ATV's abuts the park.

== History ==
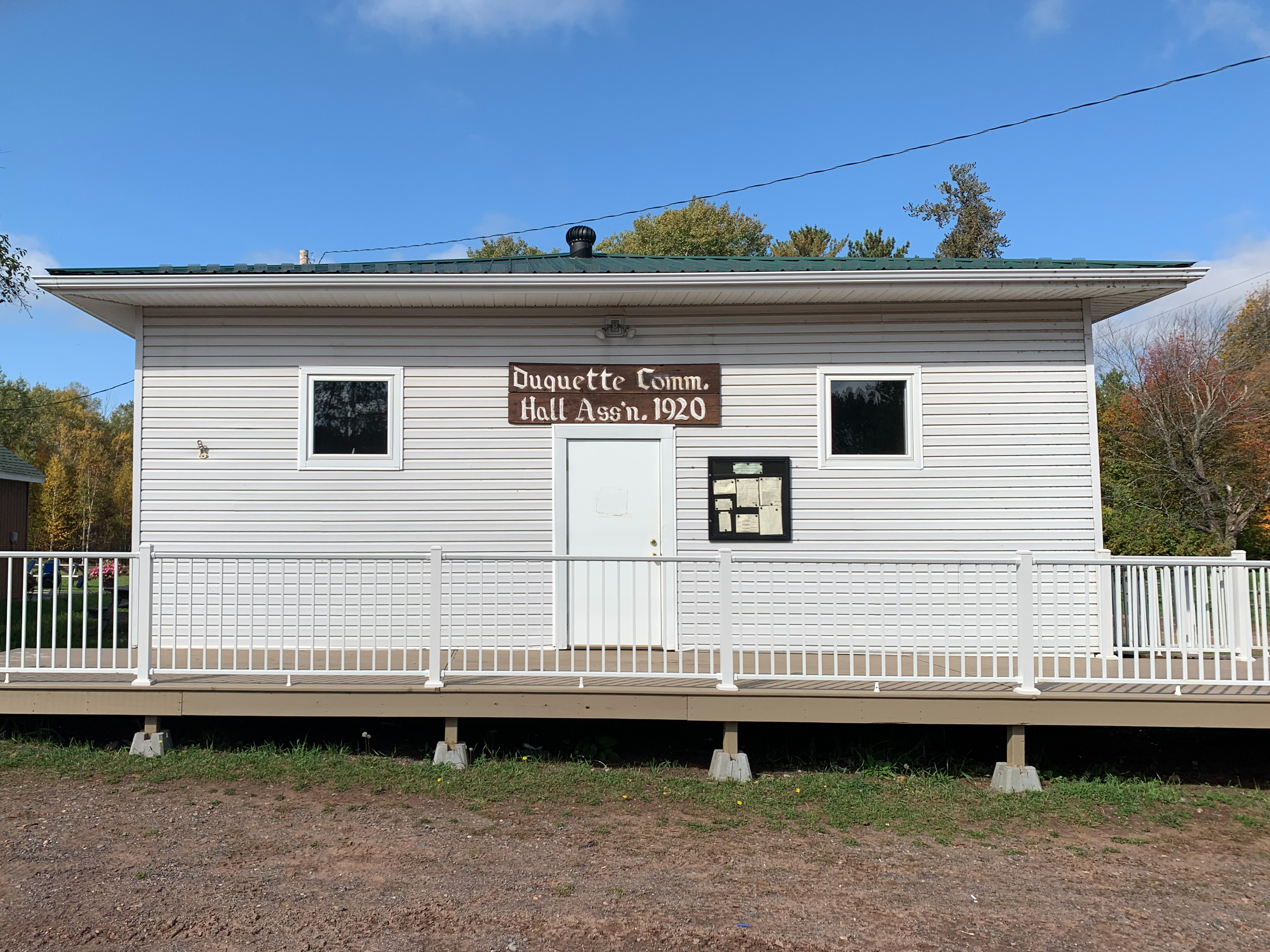
Duquette Community Hall Association

Duquette is located along the BNSF Railway on what was at one time the Great Northern Railway. It was built on an early native American village site located at the southern terminus of the Willow–Nemadji Portage; the first European settlers were French Canadians, among them was the entrepreneur Frank Duquette, who built a sawmill and store. Originally the village was named Kerrick until the Great Northern Railway depot was moved three miles south, keeping that name, and for a period Duquette was called Old Kerrick, the new site being called New Kerrick; the names were corrected when the Duquette post office was established in 1905.
