= Nickerson, Minnesota =

Nickerson
- Unincorporated community
- Location within Minnesota Location within the United States
- Coordinates: 46°24′39″N 92°29′58″W
- Country: United States
- State: Minnesota
- County: Pine
- Township: Nickerson Township
- Elevation: 1,152 ft (351 m)

Population
  - Total: 40
- Time zone: UTC-6 (Central (CST))
  - Summer (DST): UTC-5 (CDT)
- ZIP code: 55749
- Area code: 218
- GNIS feature ID: 648539

Nickerson is an unincorporated community in Nickerson Township, Pine County, Minnesota, United States.

The community is located between Sandstone and Duluth along State Highway 23 (MN 23); near the boundary line for Pine and Carlton counties.

The Nemadji River flows through the community. The Nemadji State Forest is nearby. The communities of Duquette, Kerrick and Holyoke are all near Nickerson.

== History ==
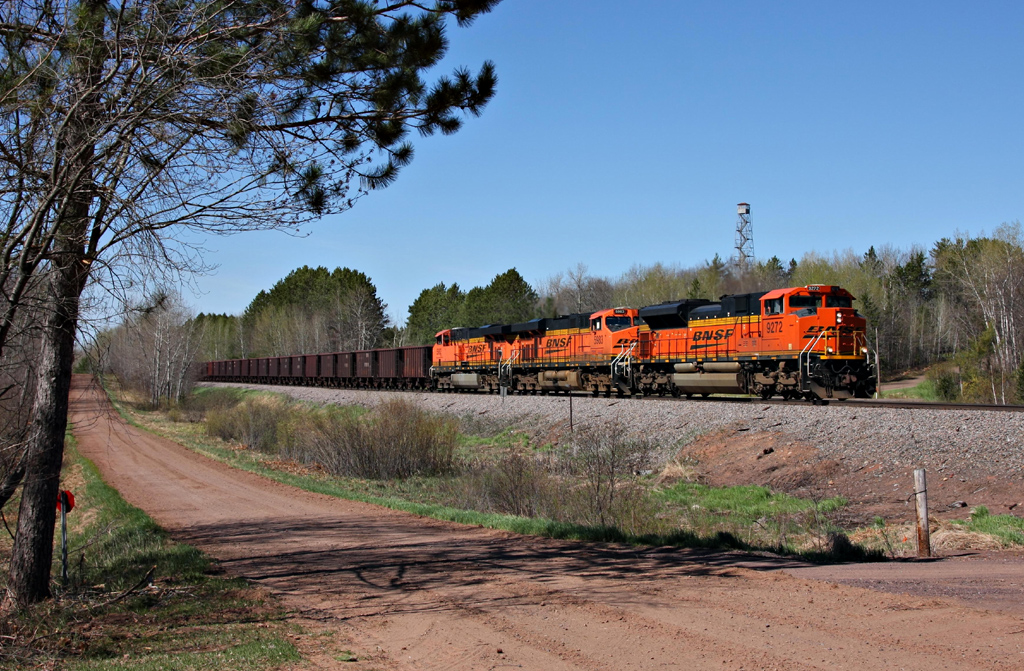
A BNSF Railway freight train passes near Nickerson on the Hinckley Subdivision railway line in 2011.

The community of Nickerson in northern Pine County was named after John Quincy Adams Nickerson of Elk River, Minnesota; who promoted the construction of the line of the Great Northern Railway that connected Sandstone to Duluth. Nickerson had a post office from 1895 to 1954.
