= Greeley, Minnesota =

Greeley
- Unincorporated community
- Location within Minnesota Location within the United States
- Coordinates: 45°44′41″N 93°04′06″W
- Country: United States
- State: Minnesota
- County: Pine
- Township: Royalton Township
- Elevation: 984 ft (300 m)

Population
  - Total: 30
- Time zone: UTC-6 (Central (CST))
  - Summer (DST): UTC-5 (CDT)
- ZIP code: 55006 and 55063
- Area code: 320
- GNIS feature ID: 644406

Greeley is an unincorporated community in Royalton Township, Pine County, Minnesota, United States.

The community is located west of Rock Creek, at the junction of Greeley Road (Pine County 1) and Clint Road (County 102). State Highway 70 (MN 70) is nearby. Greeley is located in the southwest corner of Pine County. Rush Lake is nearby.

Nearby places include Braham, Rock Creek, West Rock, Grasston, and Rush City.

Greeley is located six miles west of Rock Creek, and eight miles northwest of Rush City. Greeley is seven miles east-northeast of Braham, and 10 miles southwest of Pine City.

The community is named for Elam Greeley (1818–1882), a lumberman, who was the co-founder of the city of Stillwater, and member of the Minnesota Territorial Legislature in 1851 and 1856.

ZIP codes 55063 (Pine City), 55069 (Rush City), and 55006 (Braham) all meet near Greeley. The boundary line between Pine, Chisago, Kanabec, and Isanti counties is near Greeley.
