= West Rock, Minnesota =

West Rock
- Unincorporated community
- Location within Minnesota Location within the United States
- Coordinates: 45°46′02″N 93°01′18″W
- Country: United States
- State: Minnesota
- County: Pine
- Township: Royalton Township
- Elevation: 994 ft (303 m)

Population
  - Total: 10
- Time zone: UTC-6 (Central (CST))
  - Summer (DST): UTC-5 (CDT)
- ZIP code: 55067
- Area code: 320
- GNIS feature ID: 654000

West Rock is an unincorporated community in Royalton Township, Pine County, Minnesota, United States.

State Highway 70 (MN 70) serves as a main route in the community, and Interstate 35 is nearby.

West Rock is located immediately west of Rock Creek along Highway 70.

The center of West Rock is generally considered at the intersection of Highway 70 (MN 70) and Pine County 103 (Elmcrest Avenue); which is also the boundary line between Royalton Township and the city of Rock Creek.
