= Chengwatana Township, Pine County, Minnesota =

Chengwatana Township, Minnesota
- Township
- Location within the state of Minnesota Chengwatana Township, Minnesota (the United States)
- Coordinates: 45°52′5″N 92°51′49″W
- Country: United States
- State: Minnesota
- County: Pine

Area
  - Total: 47.3 sq mi (122.4 km^{2})
  - Land: 45.8 sq mi (118.5 km^{2})
  - Water: 1.5 sq mi (3.9 km^{2})
- Elevation: 928 ft (283 m)

Population (2000)
  - Total: 809
  - Density: 18/sq mi (6.8/km^{2})
- Time zone: UTC-6 (Central (CST))
  - Summer (DST): UTC-5 (CDT)
- ZIP code: 55063
- Area code: 320
- FIPS code: 27-11098
- GNIS feature ID: 0663789
- Website: https://chengwatanatownship.com/

Chengwatana Township is a township in Pine County, Minnesota, United States. The population was 809 at the 2000 census. Chengwatana Township was organized in 1874. Its name is derived from the Ojibwe Zhingwaadena (White-pine Town), applied originally to an Ojibwe village located at the confluence of the Snake River with the St. Croix River. Neighbouring Pine City Township and the City of Pine City get their names from the English translation of Chengwatana.

== Geography ==
According to the United States Census Bureau, the township has a total area of 47.3 square miles (123 km^{2}), of which 45.8 square miles (119 km^{2}) is land and 1.5 square miles (3.9 km^{2}) (3.20%) is water.

== Demographics ==
At the 2000 census there were 809 people, 290 households, and 218 families in the township. The population density was 17.7 inhabitants per square mile (6.8/km^{2}). There were 480 housing units at an average density of 10.5 per square mile (4.1/km^{2}). The racial makeup of the township was 98.15% White, 0.25% African American, 0.37% Native American, 0.25% Asian, and 0.99% from two or more races. Hispanic or Latino of any race were 0.62%.

Of the 290 households, 34.8% had children under the age of 18 living with them, 62.1% were married couples living together, 6.2% had a female householder with no husband present, and 24.8% were non-families. 17.6% of households were one person, and 5.5% were one person aged 65 or older. The average household size was 2.79 and the average family size was 3.17.

In the township the population was spread out, with 26.6% under the age of 18, 10.0% from 18 to 24, 27.9% from 25 to 44, 25.2% from 45 to 64, and 10.3% 65 or older. The median age was 38 years. For every 100 females, there were 114.0 males. For every 100 females age 18 and over, there were 111.4 males.

The median household income was $41,429 and the median family income was $50,938. Males had a median income of $33,542 versus $23,269 for females. The per capita income for the township was $16,974. About 6.6% of families and 12.6% of the population were below the poverty line, including 9.5% of those under age 18 and 16.9% of those age 65 or over.
