= Hinckley-Finlayson Public Schools =

School district in Minnesota, United States

Hinckley-Finlayson Public Schools (ISD #2165) is a school district headquartered in Hinckley, Minnesota.

Within Pine County it serves Hinckley, Finlayson, and Brook Park. It also serves sections of Aitkin County and Kanabec County.

== History ==
The district was established in 1994 through the consolidation of the Hinckley and Finlayson school districts. It was classified in Minnesota law as a cooperation and combination agreement.

As of 2021 the district has about 1,000 students.

== Facilities ==
By 1997 the district had a music room for the elementary school and an auditorium for events related to fine arts that was financed by a $4.3 million bond. There were three elections held, the first two being unsuccessful, but after the district promoted music as a method of learning for well into adulthood, the third election succeeded.

== Schools ==
- Hinckley-Finlayson High School
  - By 2012 a group of students formed "Friends of Rachel", inspired by Rachel's Challenge.
- Finlayson Elementary School
- Hinckley Elementary School
