= East Central Schools =

School district in Pine County, Minnesota

East Central Schools (Independent School District #2580) is a school district headquartered in unincorporated Pine County, Minnesota, with a Finlayson postal address. It has two schools: East Central Elementary School and East Central High School.

In Pine County it serves Askov, Bruno, Kerrick, and Sandstone. It also serves portions of Aitkin and Kanabec counties. The actual city of Finlayson is not in the district boundaries.

== Student discipline ==
In 2021 the school resource officer made efforts to combat the use of e cigarettes by students.

== Operations ==
The school board has seven members. While the superintendent is considered to be on the board, their vote is not tallied.
