= Bruno, Minnesota =

City in Minnesota, United States

Bruno
- City
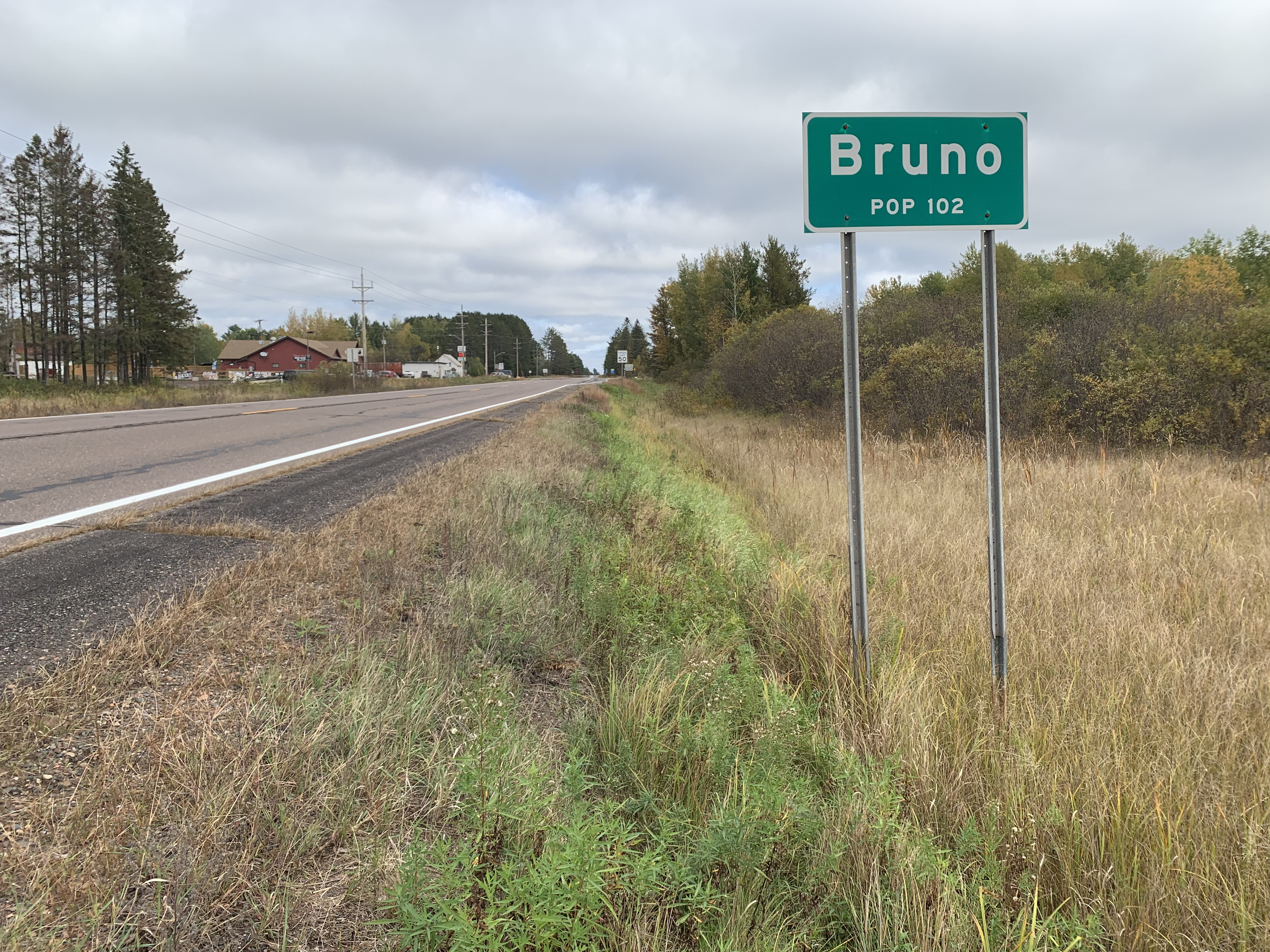
- Bruno, Minnesota sign on MN 23

- Location of the city of Bruno within Pine County, Minnesota
- Coordinates: 46°16′52″N 92°40′05″W
- Country: United States
- State: Minnesota
- County: Pine
- Incorporated: 29 August 1903

Government
  - Mayor: Denny Molgaard

Area
  - Total: 1.00 sq mi (2.58 km^{2})
  - Land: 1.00 sq mi (2.58 km^{2})
  - Water: 0 sq mi (0.00 km^{2})
- Elevation: 1,145 ft (349 m)

Population (2020)
  - Total: 85
  - Density: 85/sq mi (32.9/km^{2})
  - Demonym: Brunoine
- Time zone: UTC-6 (Central (CST))
  - Summer (DST): UTC-5 (CDT)
- ZIP code: 55712
- Area code: 320
- FIPS code: 27-08290
- GNIS feature ID: 2393443

Bruno is a city in Pine County, Minnesota, United States. The population was 85 at the 2020 census.

Minnesota State Highway 23 serves as a main route in the community.

== Geography ==
According to the United States Census Bureau, the city has a total area of 1.00 square mile (2.59 km^{2}), all land.

== History ==
Named after Bruno Township, after an early hotel owner there, the city of Bruno was incorporated on 29 August 1903. Before, the Eastern Railway Company of Minnesota operated a station in 1887 known as Mansfield Station, a village owned and platted by Fitzhugh Burns. Post office service began in 1896. Because many of the early settlers were from Czechoslovakia, the city may also have been named for Brno, a city in the Czech Republic.

== Community ==
Bruno is a small town, intersected by Minnesota State Highway 23. The town has three churches, a U.S. Post Office (ZIP code 55712), an auto repair shop, a thrift store, volunteer fire department. There is also a small park for travelers to park and rest with restrooms and a well for fresh water.

== Education ==
The local school district is East Central Schools.

== Demographics ==
Historical population
Census	Pop.	Note	%±
1910	229		—
1920	217		−5.2%
1930	167		−23.0%
1940	234		40.1%
1950	193		−17.5%
1960	116		−39.9%
1970	130		12.1%
1980	130		0.0%
1990	89		−31.5%
2000	102		14.6%
2010	102		0.0%
2020	85		−16.7%
U.S. Decennial Census

=== 2010 census ===
At the 2010 census, there were 102 people, 44 households and 29 families residing in the city. The population density was 102.0 per square mile (39.4/km^{2}). There were 53 housing units at an average density of 53.0 per square mile (20.5/km^{2}). The racial makeup of the city was 92.2% White, 1.0% African American, 4.9% Native American, and 2.0% from two or more races.

There were 44 households, of which 22.7% had children under the age of 18 living with them, 50.0% were married couples living together, 9.1% had a female householder with no husband present, 6.8% had a male householder with no wife present, and 34.1% were non-families. 29.5% of all households were made up of individuals, and 18.1% had someone living alone who was 65 years of age or older. The average household size was 2.32 and the average family size was 2.86.

The median age was 47 years. 23.5% of residents were under the age of 18; 6.9% were between the ages of 18 and 24; 17.6% were from 25 to 44; 27.3% were from 45 to 64; and 24.5% were 65 years of age or older. The gender makeup was 50.0% male and 50.0% female.

=== 2000 census ===
At the 2000 census, there were 102 people, 44 households and 28 families residing in the city. The population density was 102.0 inhabitants per square mile (39.4/km^{2}). There were 56 housing units at an average density of 56.0 per square mile (21.6/km^{2}). The racial makeup of the city was 96.08% White, 0.98% African American and 2.94% Native American.

There were 44 households, of which 22.7% had children under the age of 18 living with them, 50.0% were married couples living together, 15.9% had a female householder with no husband present, and 34.1% were non-families. 27.3% of all households were made up of individuals, and 9.1% had someone living alone who was 65 years of age or older. The average household size was 2.32 and the average family size was 2.83.

25.5% of the population were under the age of 18, 7.8% from 18 to 24, 22.5% from 25 to 44, 27.5% from 45 to 64, and 16.7% who were 65 years of age or older. The median age was 43 years. For every 100 females, there were 78.9 males. For every 100 females age 18 and over, there were 85.4 males.

The median household income was $28,125 and the median family income was $33,125. Males had a median income of $31,875 and females $15,000. The per capita income was $15,439. There were 18.5% of families and 19.0% of the population living below the poverty line, including 100.0% of under eighteens and none of those over 64.
