= Barry Township, Pine County, Minnesota =

Barry Township, Minnesota
- Township
- Location within the state of Minnesota Barry Township, Minnesota (the United States)
- Coordinates: 46°1′19″N 92°52′38″W
- Country: United States
- State: Minnesota
- County: Pine

Area
  - Total: 35.4 sq mi (91.8 km^{2})
  - Land: 35.2 sq mi (91.1 km^{2})
  - Water: 0.27 sq mi (0.7 km^{2})
- Elevation: 920 ft (280 m)

Population (2000)
  - Total: 587
  - Density: 17/sq mi (6.4/km^{2})
- Time zone: UTC-6 (Central (CST))
  - Summer (DST): UTC-5 (CDT)
- FIPS code: 27-03736
- GNIS feature ID: 0663513
- Website: https://barrytownshipmn.gov/

Barry Township is a township in Pine County, Minnesota, United States. The population was 587 at the 2000 census.

The township was named for Edward Barry, a railroad engineer.

== Geography ==
According to the United States Census Bureau, the township has a total area of 35.5 square miles (92 km^{2}), of which 35.2 square miles (91 km^{2}) is land and 0.3 square miles (0.78 km^{2}) (0.82%) is water.

== Demographics ==
As of the census of 2000, there were 587 people, 209 households, and 155 families residing in the township. The population density was 16.7 inhabitants per square mile (6.4/km^{2}). There were 258 housing units at an average density of 7.3 per square mile (2.8/km^{2}). The racial makeup of the township was 83.82% White, 0.34% African American, 13.12% Native American, 0.68% Asian, 0.17% from other races, and 1.87% from two or more races. Hispanic or Latino of any race were 1.19% of the population.

There were 209 households, out of which 40.2% had children under the age of 18 living with them, 58.9% were married couples living together, 9.6% had a female householder with no husband present, and 25.4% were non-families. 20.6% of all households were made up of individuals, and 7.7% had someone living alone who was 65 years of age or older. The average household size was 2.81 and the average family size was 3.19.

In the township the population was spread out, with 31.5% under the age of 18, 7.5% from 18 to 24, 29.1% from 25 to 44, 21.6% from 45 to 64, and 10.2% who were 65 years of age or older. The median age was 35 years. For every 100 females, there were 107.4 males. For every 100 females age 18 and over, there were 106.2 males.

The median income for a household in the township was $35,227, and the median income for a family was $37,250. Males had a median income of $30,288 versus $21,944 for females. The per capita income for the township was $14,740. About 12.0% of families and 17.7% of the population were below the poverty line, including 22.8% of those under age 18 and 22.7% of those age 65 or over.
