= Wilma Township, Pine County, Minnesota =

Wilma Township, Minnesota
- Township
- Location within the state of Minnesota Wilma Township, Minnesota (the United States)
- Coordinates: 46°5′49″N 92°29′45″W
- Country: United States
- State: Minnesota
- County: Pine

Area
  - Total: 36.8 sq mi (95.3 km^{2})
  - Land: 36.3 sq mi (94.1 km^{2})
  - Water: 0.46 sq mi (1.2 km^{2})
- Elevation: 1,066 ft (325 m)

Population (2000)
  - Total: 137
  - Density: 3.9/sq mi (1.5/km^{2})
- Time zone: UTC-6 (Central (CST))
  - Summer (DST): UTC-5 (CDT)
- FIPS code: 27-70528
- GNIS feature ID: 0666004
- Website: https://www.wilmatownship.org/

Wilma Township is a township in Pine County, Minnesota, United States. The population was 137 at the 2000 census.

== Geography ==
According to the United States Census Bureau, the township has a total area of 36.8 square miles (95.3 km^{2}), of which 36.3 square miles (94.1 km^{2}) is land and 0.4 square mile (1.2 km^{2}) (1.22%) is water.

== Demographics ==
As of the census of 2000, there were 137 people, 33 households, and 17 families residing in the township. The population density was 3.8 people per square mile (1.5/km^{2}). There were 114 housing units at an average density of 3.1/sq mi (1.2/km^{2}). The racial makeup of the township was 77.37% White, 8.76% African American, 5.11% Native American, 1.46% Asian, 1.46% from other races, and 5.84% from two or more races. Hispanic or Latino of any race were 2.92% of the population.

There were 33 households, out of which 9.1% had children under the age of 18 living with them, 45.5% were married couples living together, 3.0% had a female householder with no husband present, and 45.5% were non-families. 30.3% of all households were made up of individuals, and 9.1% had someone living alone who was 65 years of age or older. The average household size was 1.85 and the average family size was 2.17.

In the township the population was spread out, with 58.4% under the age of 18, 5.1% from 18 to 24, 10.9% from 25 to 44, 10.2% from 45 to 64, and 15.3% who were 65 years of age or older. The median age was 17 years. For every 100 females, there were 140.4 males. For every 100 females age 18 and over, there were 171.4 males.

The median income for a household in the township was $32,917, and the median income for a family was $38,750. Males had a median income of $38,250 versus $26,875 for females. The per capita income for the township was $7,193. There were 8.3% of families and 22.5% of the population living below the poverty line, including 50.0% of under eighteens and 5.9% of those over 64.
