= Birch Creek Township, Pine County, Minnesota =

Birch Creek Township, Minnesota
- Township
- Location within the state of Minnesota Birch Creek Township, Minnesota (the United States)
- Coordinates: 46°22′45″N 92°58′49″W
- Country: United States
- State: Minnesota
- County: Pine

Area
  - Total: 35.1 sq mi (90.9 km^{2})
  - Land: 35.1 sq mi (90.8 km^{2})
  - Water: 0.039 sq mi (0.1 km^{2})
- Elevation: 1,316 ft (401 m)

Population (2000)
  - Total: 217
  - Density: 6.2/sq mi (2.4/km^{2})
- Time zone: UTC-6 (Central (CST))
  - Summer (DST): UTC-5 (CDT)
- FIPS code: 27-05986
- GNIS feature ID: 0663595
- Website: https://www.birchcreektownship.com/

Birch Creek Township is a township in Pine County, Minnesota, United States. The population was 217 at the 2000 census.

== Geography ==
According to the United States Census Bureau, the township has a total area of 35.1 square miles (91 km^{2}), of which 35.1 square miles (91 km^{2}) is land and 0.04 square miles (0.10 km^{2}) (0.06%) is water.

== Demographics ==
As of the census of 2000, there were 217 people, 93 households, and 63 families residing in the township. The population density was 6.2 inhabitants per square mile (2.4/km^{2}). There were 134 housing units at an average density of 3.8 per square mile (1.5/km^{2}). The racial makeup of the township was 212 White, one African American, two Native American, one Asian, and one from two or more races. Hispanic or Latino of any race were one of the population.

There were 93 households, out of which 23.7% had children under the age of 18 living with them, 58.1% were married couples living together, 5.4% had a female householder with no husband present, and 31.2% were non-families. 28.0% of all households were made up of individuals, and 12.9% had someone living alone who was 65 years of age or older. The average household size was 2.33 and the average family size was 2.81.

In the township the population was spread out, with 17.5% under the age of 18, 8.3% from 18 to 24, 20.3% from 25 to 44, 33.6% from 45 to 64, and 20.3% who were 65 years of age or older. The median age was 46 years. For every 100 females, there were 112.7 males. For every 100 females age 18 and over, there were 115.7 males.

The median income for a household in the township was $37,344, and the median income for a family was $42,250. Males had a median income of $25,500 versus $19,583 for females. The per capita income for the township was $15,839. About 5.6% of families and 10.7% of the population were below the poverty line, including 27.1% of those under the age of eighteen and none of those 65 or over.
