= Beroun, Minnesota =

Beroun
- Unincorporated community
- Location within Minnesota Location within the United States
- Coordinates: 45°54′37″N 92°57′19″W
- Country: United States
- State: Minnesota
- County: Pine
- Township: Mission Creek Township
- Elevation: 974 ft (297 m)

Population
  - Total: 120
- Time zone: UTC-6 (Central (CST))
  - Summer (DST): UTC-5 (CDT)
- ZIP code: 55063
- Area code: 320
- GNIS feature ID: 639974

Beroun is an unincorporated community in Mission Creek Township, Pine County, Minnesota, United States.

Interstate 35 and Pine County Roads 14 and 61 are three of the main routes in the community. I-35 runs north–south, and County Road 14 (Beroun Crossing Road) runs east–west.

Beroun is between Hinckley and Pine City.

Founded circa 1882 as "Brown's Hill" along the Northern Pacific Railroad line, it was renamed in 1895 when a post office called "Beroun" was established, and remained in operation until 1993. The community was founded by Czech immigrants, who named it after the town of Beroun in the Czech Republic. Beroun was a station on the Northern Pacific Railroad.

ZIP codes 55063 (Pine City), 55037 (Hinckley), and 55007 (Brook Park) all intersect near Beroun.
