= Norman Township, Pine County, Minnesota =

Norman Township, Minnesota
- Township
- Location within the state of Minnesota Norman Township, Minnesota (the United States)
- Coordinates: 46°18′26″N 92°44′37″W
- Country: United States
- State: Minnesota
- County: Pine

Area
  - Total: 35.9 sq mi (93.0 km^{2})
  - Land: 35.7 sq mi (92.4 km^{2})
  - Water: 0.19 sq mi (0.5 km^{2})
- Elevation: 1,109 ft (338 m)

Population (2000)
  - Total: 247
  - Density: 7.0/sq mi (2.7/km^{2})
- Time zone: UTC-6 (Central (CST))
  - Summer (DST): UTC-5 (CDT)
- ZIP code: 55795
- Area code: 218
- FIPS code: 27-46618
- GNIS feature ID: 0665138

Norman Township is a township in Pine County, Minnesota, United States. The population was 247 at the 2000 census.

Norman Township was named for the Norwegians, or Normans, who settled in this area.

== Geography ==
According to the United States Census Bureau, the township has a total area of 35.9 square miles (93.0 km^{2}), of which 35.7 square miles (92.4 km^{2}) is land and 0.2 square mile (0.5 km^{2}) (0.56%) is water.

== Demographics ==
As of the census of 2000, there were 247 people, 107 households, and 71 families residing in the township. The population density was 6.9 people per square mile (2.7/km^{2}). There were 197 housing units at an average density of 5.5/sq mi (2.1/km^{2}). The racial makeup of the township was 93.52% White, 2.02% African American, 4.05% Native American and 0.40% Pacific Islander.

There were 107 households, out of which 22.4% had children under the age of 18 living with them, 57.9% were married couples living together, 5.6% had a female householder with no husband present, and 33.6% were non-families. 27.1% of all households were made up of individuals, and 12.1% had someone living alone who was 65 years of age or older. The average household size was 2.31 and the average family size was 2.83.

In the township the population was spread out, with 18.6% under the age of 18, 8.1% from 18 to 24, 26.7% from 25 to 44, 25.5% from 45 to 64, and 21.1% who were 65 years of age or older. The median age was 44 years. For every 100 females, there were 111.1 males. For every 100 females age 18 and over, there were 107.2 males.

The median income for a household in the township was $29,583, and the median income for a family was $36,667. Males had a median income of $40,357 versus $31,875 for females. The per capita income for the township was $16,698. About 10.5% of families and 12.0% of the population were below the poverty line, including 4.4% of those under the age of eighteen and 11.9% of those 65 or over.
