= Fleming Township, Pine County, Minnesota =

Fleming Township, Minnesota
- Township
- Location within the state of Minnesota Fleming Township, Minnesota (the United States)
- Coordinates: 46°13′9″N 92°38′49″W
- Country: United States
- State: Minnesota
- County: Pine

Area
  - Total: 36.2 sq mi (93.7 km^{2})
  - Land: 36.1 sq mi (93.6 km^{2})
  - Water: 0.039 sq mi (0.1 km^{2})
- Elevation: 1,171 ft (357 m)

Population (2000)
  - Total: 115
  - Density: 3.1/sq mi (1.2/km^{2})
- Time zone: UTC-6 (Central (CST))
  - Summer (DST): UTC-5 (CDT)
- FIPS code: 27-21248
- GNIS feature ID: 0664174

Fleming Township is a township in Pine County, Minnesota, United States. The population was 115 at the 2000 census.

Fleming Township bears the name of a lumberman.

== Geography ==
According to the United States Census Bureau, the township has a total area of 36.2 square miles (94 km^{2}), of which 36.1 square miles (93 km^{2}) is land and 0.04 square miles (0.10 km^{2}) (0.08%) is water.

== Demographics ==
As of the census of 2000, there were 115 people, 43 households, and 31 families residing in the township. The population density was 3.2 people per square mile (1.2/km^{2}). There were 121 housing units at an average density of 3.3/sq mi (1.3/km^{2}). The racial makeup of the township was 97.39% White, 0.87% Native American, 0.87% from other races, and 0.87% from two or more races. Hispanic or Latino of any race were 1.74% of the population.

There were 43 households, out of which 25.6% had children under the age of 18 living with them, 62.8% were married couples living together, 11.6% had a female householder with no husband present, and 25.6% were non-families. 20.9% of all households were made up of individuals, and 11.6% had someone living alone who was 65 years of age or older. The average household size was 2.67 and the average family size was 3.09.

In the township the population was spread out, with 23.5% under the age of 18, 9.6% from 18 to 24, 17.4% from 25 to 44, 27.8% from 45 to 64, and 21.7% who were 65 years of age or older. The median age was 44 years. For every 100 females, there were 82.5 males. For every 100 females age 18 and over, there were 91.3 males.

The median income for a household in the township was $26,875, and the median income for a family was $52,500. Males had a median income of $63,125 versus $23,750 for females. The per capita income for the township was $15,441. There were no families and 4.3% of the population living below the poverty line, including no under eighteens and none of those over 64.
