= Bremen Township, Pine County, Minnesota =

Bremen Township, Minnesota
- Township
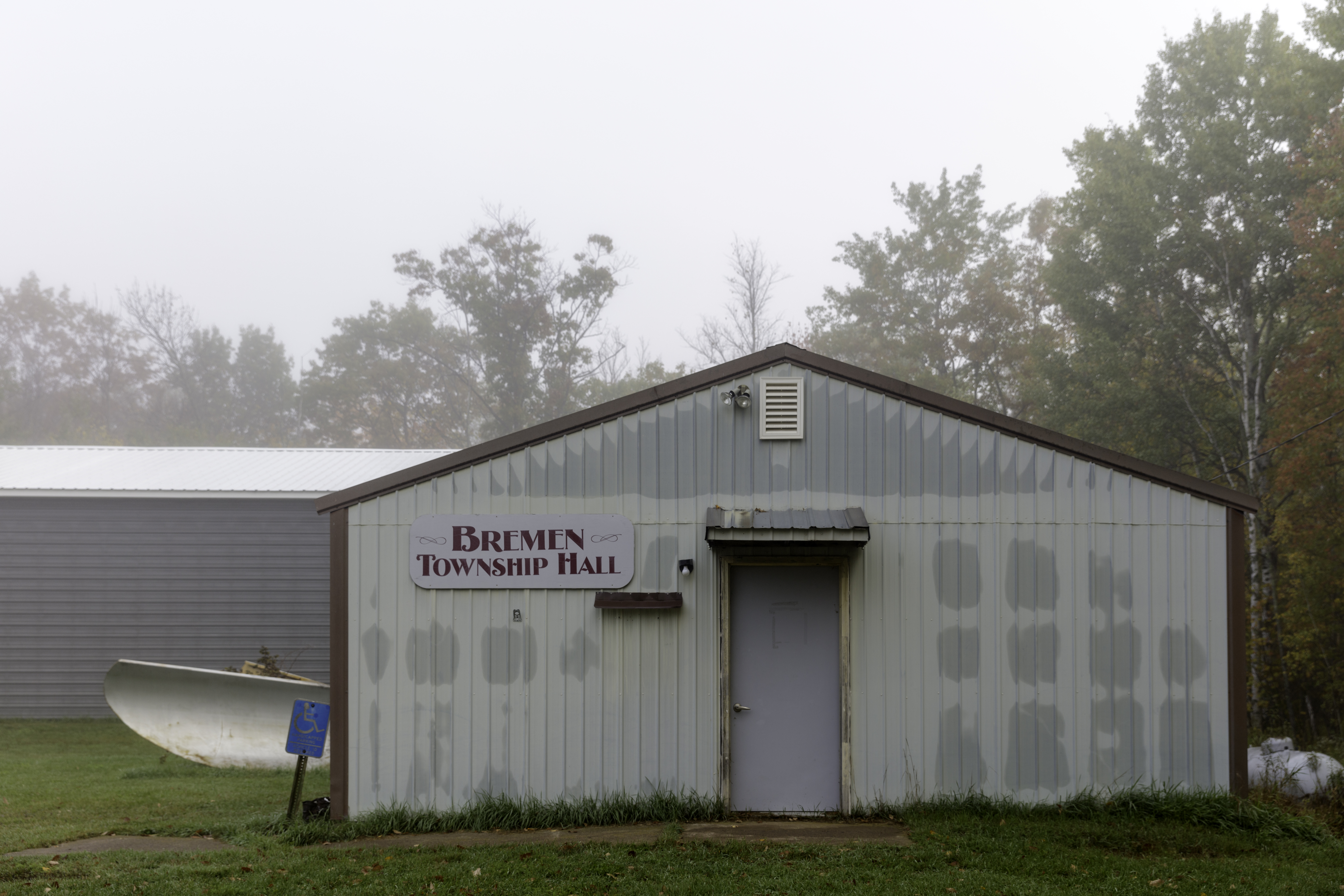
- Bremen Township Hall

- Location within the state of Minnesota Bremen Township, Minnesota (the United States)
- Coordinates: 46°16′49″N 93°0′5″W
- Country: United States
- State: Minnesota
- County: Pine

Area
  - Total: 36.2 sq mi (93.7 km^{2})
  - Land: 36.0 sq mi (93.2 km^{2})
  - Water: 0.23 sq mi (0.6 km^{2})
- Elevation: 1,198 ft (365 m)

Population (2000)
  - Total: 246
  - Density: 6.7/sq mi (2.6/km^{2})
- Time zone: UTC-6 (Central (CST))
  - Summer (DST): UTC-5 (CDT)
- ZIP code: 55735
- Area code: 320
- FIPS code: 27-07552
- GNIS feature ID: 0663661

Bremen Township is a township in Pine County, Minnesota, United States. The population was 246 at the 2000 census.

== History ==
Bremen Township was established in 1906. The township was named after Bremen, in Germany.

== Geography ==
According to the United States Census Bureau, the township has a total area of 36.2 square miles (94 km^{2}), of which 36.0 square miles (93 km^{2}) is land and 0.2 square miles (0.52 km^{2}) (0.61%) is water.

== Demographics ==
As of the census of 2000, there were 246 people, 87 households, and 64 families residing in the township. The population density was 6.8 inhabitants per square mile (2.6/km^{2}). There were 181 housing units at an average density of 5.0 per square mile (1.9/km^{2}). The racial makeup of the township was 98.78% White, 0.41% Native American, 0.41% from other races, and 0.41% from two or more races.

There were 87 households, out of which 35.6% had children under the age of 18 living with them, 59.8% were married couples living together, 8.0% had a female householder with no husband present, and 25.3% were non-families. 16.1% of all households were made up of individuals, and 5.7% had someone living alone who was 65 years of age or older. The average household size was 2.83 and the average family size was 3.22.

In the township the population was spread out, with 28.9% under the age of 18, 4.9% from 18 to 24, 25.6% from 25 to 44, 29.7% from 45 to 64, and 11.0% who were 65 years of age or older. The median age was 41 years. For every 100 females, there were 100.0 males. For every 100 females age 18 and over, there were 105.9 males.

The median income for a household in the township was $30,278, and the median income for a family was $32,159. Males had a median income of $31,786 versus $26,875 for females. The per capita income for the township was $12,504. About 5.1% of families and 5.9% of the population were below the poverty line, including none of those under the age of eighteen and 8.0% of those 65 or over.
