= Kettle River Township, Pine County, Minnesota =

Kettle River Township, Minnesota
- Township
- Location within the state of Minnesota Kettle River Township, Minnesota (the United States)
- Coordinates: 46°17′33″N 92°51′34″W
- Country: United States
- State: Minnesota
- County: Pine

Area
  - Total: 31.0 sq mi (80.4 km^{2})
  - Land: 30.2 sq mi (78.3 km^{2})
  - Water: 0.81 sq mi (2.1 km^{2})
- Elevation: 1,024 ft (312 m)

Population (2000)
  - Total: 491
  - Density: 16/sq mi (6.3/km^{2})
- Time zone: UTC-6 (Central (CST))
  - Summer (DST): UTC-5 (CDT)
- FIPS code: 27-32984
- GNIS feature ID: 0664624

Kettle River Township is a township in Pine County, Minnesota, United States. The population was 491 at the 2000 census.

Kettle River Township was organized in 1874, and named after the Kettle River.

== Geography ==
According to the United States Census Bureau, the township has a total area of 31.0 square miles (80 km^{2}), of which 30.2 square miles (78 km^{2}) is land and 0.8 square miles (2.1 km^{2}) (2.67%) is water.

== Demographics ==
As of the census of 2000, there were 491 people, 187 households, and 131 families residing in the township. The population density was 16.2 inhabitants per square mile (6.3/km^{2}). There were 342 housing units at an average density of 11.3 per square mile (4.4/km^{2}). The racial makeup of the township was 95.93% White, 0.41% African American, 2.04% Native American, 0.20% Asian, 1.02% from other races, and 0.41% from two or more races. Hispanic or Latino of any race were 1.22% of the population.

There were 187 households, out of which 29.9% had children under the age of 18 living with them, 62.0% were married couples living together, 5.9% had a female householder with no husband present, and 29.9% were non-families. 24.1% of all households were made up of individuals, and 12.3% had someone living alone who was 65 years of age or older. The average household size was 2.63 and the average family size was 3.16.

In the township the population was spread out, with 26.5% under the age of 18, 7.9% from 18 to 24, 23.6% from 25 to 44, 26.3% from 45 to 64, and 15.7% who were 65 years of age or older. The median age was 40 years. For every 100 females, there were 107.2 males. For every 100 females age 18 and over, there were 109.9 males.

The median income for a household in the township was $33,333, and the median income for a family was $42,917. Males had a median income of $25,625 versus $16,500 for females. The per capita income for the township was $16,370. About 6.9% of families and 15.9% of the population were below the poverty line, including 30.7% of those under age 18 and 7.8% of those age 65 or over.
