= Pokegama Township, Pine County, Minnesota =

Pokegama Township, Minnesota
- Township
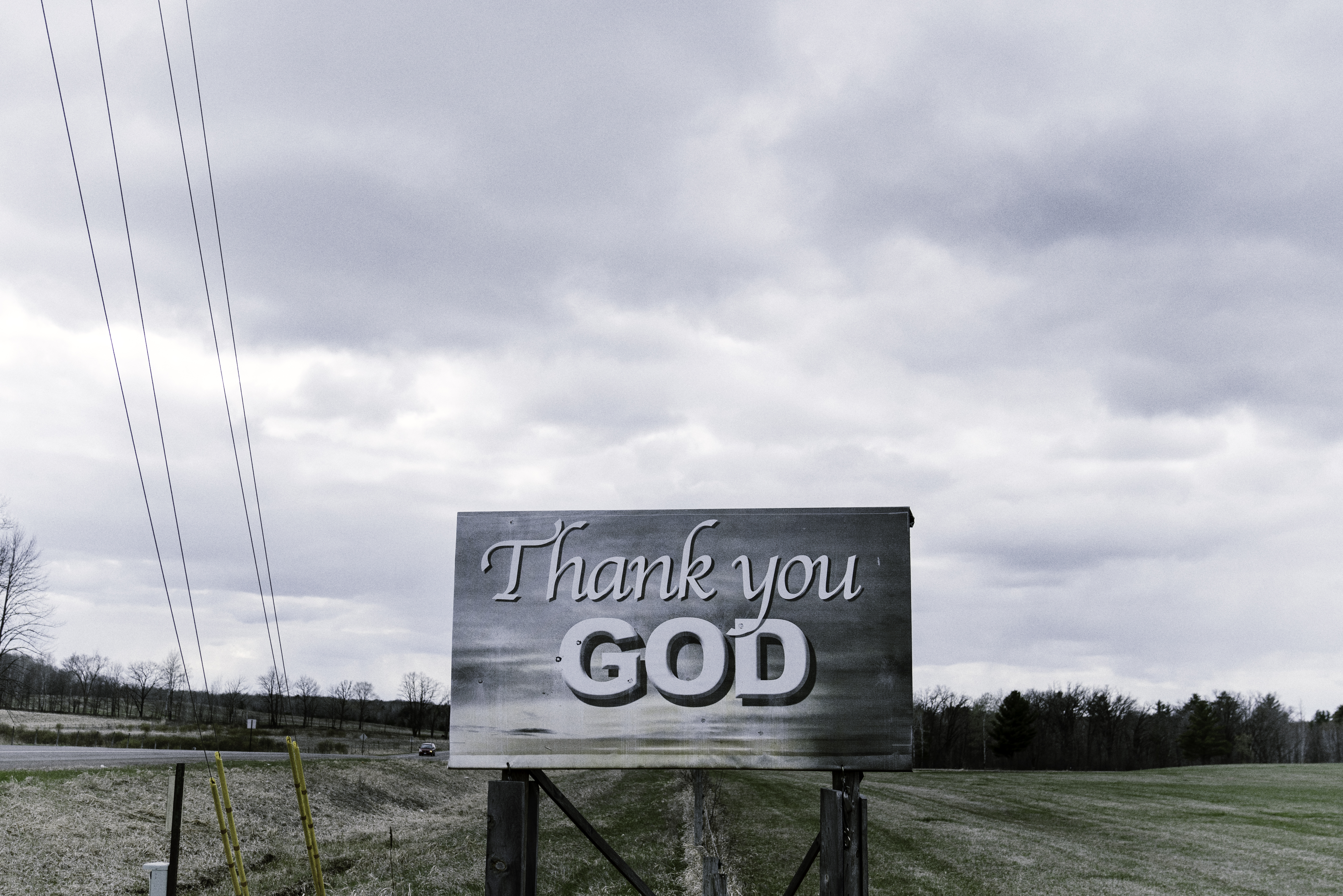
- Sign in Pokegama

- Location within the state of Minnesota Pokegama Township, Minnesota (the United States)
- Coordinates: 45°51′47″N 93°1′0″W
- Country: United States
- State: Minnesota
- County: Pine

Area
  - Total: 55.0 sq mi (142.5 km^{2})
  - Land: 51.6 sq mi (133.7 km^{2})
  - Water: 3.4 sq mi (8.8 km^{2})
- Elevation: 935 ft (285 m)

Population (2000)
  - Total: 2,570
  - Density: 50/sq mi (19.2/km^{2})
- Time zone: UTC-6 (Central (CST))
  - Summer (DST): UTC-5 (CDT)
- FIPS code: 27-51784
- GNIS feature ID: 0665330
- Website: https://pokegamatownship.gov/

Pokegama Township is a township in Pine County, Minnesota, United States. The population was 2,570 at the 2000 census.

== Geography ==
According to the United States Census Bureau, the township has a total area of 55.0 square miles (142.5 km^{2}), of which 51.6 square miles (133.7 km^{2}) is land and 3.4 square miles (8.8 km^{2}) (6.20%) is water.

== Demographics ==
As of the census of 2000, there were 2,570 people, 994 households, and 761 families residing in the township. The population density was 49.8 inhabitants per square mile (19.2/km^{2}). There were 1,468 housing units at an average density of 28.4 per square mile (11.0/km^{2}). The racial makeup of the township was 98.29% White, 0.19% African American, 0.70% Native American, 0.16% from other races, and 0.66% from two or more races. Hispanic or Latino of any race were 0.54% of the population.

There were 994 households, out of which 29.1% had children under the age of 18 living with them, 68.8% were married couples living together, 4.2% had a female householder with no husband present, and 23.4% were non-families. 18.5% of all households were made up of individuals, and 6.5% had someone living alone who was 65 years of age or older. The average household size was 2.57 and the average family size was 2.91.

In the township the population was spread out, with 24.2% under the age of 18, 5.3% from 18 to 24, 28.0% from 25 to 44, 26.1% from 45 to 64, and 16.5% who were 65 years of age or older. The median age was 40 years. For every 100 females, there were 105.9 males. For every 100 females age 18 and over, there were 105.9 males.

The median income for a household in the township was $41,604, and the median income for a family was $44,559. Males had a median income of $29,417 versus $21,667 for females. The per capita income for the township was $19,027. About 5.2% of families and 7.3% of the population were below the poverty line, including 5.8% of those under age 18 and 6.7% of those age 65 or over.
