= Henriette, Minnesota =

City in Minnesota, United States

Henriette
- City
- Location of the city of Henriette within Pine County, Minnesota
- Coordinates: 45°52′17″N 93°7′11″W
- Country: United States
- State: Minnesota
- County: Pine
- Incorporated: March 13, 1920

Government
  - Mayor: Giles Nelson

Area
  - Total: 0.28 sq mi (0.73 km^{2})
  - Land: 0.28 sq mi (0.73 km^{2})
  - Water: 0 sq mi (0.00 km^{2})
- Elevation: 994 ft (303 m)

Population (2023)
  - Total: 57
  - Density: 203.1/sq mi (78.41/km^{2})
  - Demonym: Henriettard
- Time zone: UTC-6 (Central (CST))
  - Summer (DST): UTC-5 (CDT)
- ZIP code: 55036
- Area code: 320
- FIPS code: 27-28574
- GNIS feature ID: 2394354

Henriette, is a city in Pine County, Minnesota, United States. The population was 59 in 2023.

Henriette was founded as Cornell.

== Geography ==
According to the United States Census Bureau, the city has a total area of 0.29 square miles (0.75 km^{2}), all land.

Minnesota State Highway 107 and Pine County 11 are two of the main routes in the community.

== Demographics ==
Historical population
Census	Pop.	Note	%±
1930	128		—
1940	148		15.6%
1950	57		−61.5%
1960	65		14.0%
1970	56		−13.8%
1980	61		8.9%
1990	78		27.9%
2000	101		29.5%
2010	71		−29.7%
2020	57		−19.7%
U.S. Decennial Census

=== 2010 census ===
As of the census of 2010, there were 71 people, 32 households, and 19 families living in the city. The population density was 244.8 inhabitants per square mile (94.5/km^{2}). There were 38 housing units at an average density of 131.0 per square mile (50.6/km^{2}). The racial makeup of the city was 90.1% White, 1.4% Asian, 4.2% from other races, and 4.2% from two or more races. Hispanic or Latino of any race were 4.2% of the population.

There were 32 households, of which 28.1% had children under the age of 18 living with them, 31.3% were married couples living together, 15.6% had a female householder with no husband present, 12.5% had a male householder with no wife present, and 40.6% were non-families. 40.6% of all households were made up of individuals, and 15.7% had someone living alone who was 65 years of age or older. The average household size was 2.22 and the average family size was 2.84.

The median age in the city was 44.3 years. 22.5% of residents were under the age of 18; 8.4% were between the ages of 18 and 24; 21.1% were from 25 to 44; 25.3% were from 45 to 64; and 22.5% were 65 years of age or older. The gender makeup of the city was 54.9% male and 45.1% female.

=== 2000 census ===
As of the census of 2000, there were 101 people, 37 households, and 24 families living in the city. The population density was 398.8 inhabitants per square mile (154.0/km^{2}). There were 38 housing units at an average density of 150.0 per square mile (57.9/km^{2}). The racial makeup of the city was 95.05% White, 1.98% Native American, 2.97% from other races. Hispanic or Latino of any race were 4.95% of the population.

There were 37 households, out of which 45.9% had children under the age of 18 living with them, 35.1% were married couples living together, 21.6% had a female householder with no husband present, and 35.1% were non-families. 27.0% of all households were made up of individuals, and 5.4% had someone living alone who was 65 years of age or older. The average household size was 2.73 and the average family size was 3.33.

In the city, the population was spread out, with 34.7% under the age of 18, 9.9% from 18 to 24, 31.7% from 25 to 44, 17.8% from 45 to 64, and 5.9% who were 65 years of age or older. The median age was 30 years. For every 100 females, there were 152.5 males. For every 100 females aged 18 and over, there were 112.9 males.

The median income for a household in the city was $28,542, and the median income for a family was $42,917. Males had a median income of $24,167 versus $16,250 for females. The per capita income for the city was $13,312. There were no families and 12.6% of the population living below the poverty line, including no under eighteens and none of those over 64.
