= Mission Creek (Snake River tributary) =

Stream in Pine County, Minnesota, U.S.

Coordinates: 45°49′01″N 93°01′53″W

Mission Creek is a stream in Pine County, in the U.S. state of Minnesota. It is a tributary of the Snake River.

Mission Creek took its name from an Ojibwe Indian mission founded near the creek in 1836.

== See also ==
- List of rivers of Minnesota
