= Mission Creek Township, Pine County, Minnesota =

Mission Creek Township, Minnesota
- Township
- Location within the state of Minnesota Mission Creek Township, Minnesota (the United States)
- Coordinates: 45°55′46″N 92°58′2″W
- Country: United States
- State: Minnesota
- County: Pine

Area
  - Total: 31.8 sq mi (82.3 km^{2})
  - Land: 31.7 sq mi (82.0 km^{2})
  - Water: 0.12 sq mi (0.3 km^{2})
- Elevation: 968 ft (295 m)

Population (2000)
  - Total: 590
  - Density: 19/sq mi (7.2/km^{2})
- Time zone: UTC-6 (Central (CST))
  - Summer (DST): UTC-5 (CDT)
- FIPS code: 27-43486
- GNIS feature ID: 0665002
- Website: https://www.missioncreektownship.com/

Mission Creek Township is a township in Pine County, Minnesota, United States. The population was 590 at the 2000 census.

== History ==
Mission Creek Township was organized in 1880, and named after Mission Creek. It was destroyed in the Great Hinckley Fire of 1894.

== Geography ==
According to the United States Census Bureau, the township has a total area of 31.8 square miles (82.3 km^{2}), of which 31.7 square miles (82.0 km^{2}) is land and 0.1 square mile (0.3 km^{2}) (0.35%) is water.

== Demographics ==
As of the census of 2000, there were 590 people, 216 households, and 166 families residing in the township. The population density was 18.6 people per square mile (7.2/km^{2}). There were 241 housing units at an average density of 7.6/sq mi (2.9/km^{2}). The racial makeup of the township was 97.12% White, 0.17% African American, 0.17% Native American, and 2.54% from two or more races. Hispanic or Latino of any race were 1.02% of the population.

There were 216 households, out of which 35.2% had children under the age of 18 living with them, 63.9% were married couples living together, 9.7% had a female householder with no husband present, and 23.1% were non-families. 16.7% of all households were made up of individuals, and 6.9% had someone living alone who was 65 years of age or older. The average household size was 2.73 and the average family size was 3.07.

In the township the population was spread out, with 29.3% under the age of 18, 9.0% from 18 to 24, 27.8% from 25 to 44, 22.5% from 45 to 64, and 11.4% who were 65 years of age or older. The median age was 36 years. For every 100 females, there were 98.7 males. For every 100 females age 18 and over, there were 104.4 males.

The median income for a household in the township was $38,194, and the median income for a family was $45,500. Males had a median income of $30,781 versus $23,182 for females. The per capita income for the township was $16,448. About 6.3% of families and 10.6% of the population were below the poverty line, including 16.8% of those under age 18 and 12.2% of those age 65 or over.
