= Sturgeon Lake Township, Pine County, Minnesota =

Sturgeon Lake Township, Minnesota
- Township
- Location within the state of Minnesota Sturgeon Lake Township, Minnesota (the United States)
- Coordinates: 46°21′52″N 92°50′32″W
- Country: United States
- State: Minnesota
- County: Pine

Area
  - Total: 32.2 sq mi (83.5 km^{2})
  - Land: 32.2 sq mi (83.3 km^{2})
  - Water: 0.077 sq mi (0.2 km^{2})
- Elevation: 1,040 ft (317 m)

Population (2000)
  - Total: 409
  - Density: 13/sq mi (4.9/km^{2})
- Time zone: UTC-6 (Central (CST))
  - Summer (DST): UTC-5 (CDT)
- ZIP code: 55783
- Area code: 218
- FIPS code: 27-63238
- GNIS feature ID: 0665731
- Website: https://www.sturgeonlaketownship.com/

Sturgeon Lake Township is a township in Pine County, Minnesota, United States. The population was 409 at the 2000 census.

== Geography ==
According to the United States Census Bureau, the township has a total area of 32.2 square miles (83.4 km^{2}), of which 32.1 square miles (83.2 km^{2}) is land and 0.1 square mile (0.2 km^{2}) (0.25%) is water.

== Demographics ==
As of the census of 2000, there were 409 people, 124 households, and 101 families residing in the township. The population density was 12.7 people per square mile (4.9/km^{2}). There were 169 housing units at an average density of 5.3/sq mi (2.0/km^{2}). The racial makeup of the township was 88.26% White, 8.07% African American, 0.98% Native American, 1.96% from other races, and 0.73% from two or more races. Hispanic or Latino of any race were 2.20% of the population.

There were 124 households, out of which 37.1% had children under the age of 18 living with them, 73.4% were married couples living together, 5.6% had a female householder with no husband present, and 18.5% were non-families. 17.7% of all households were made up of individuals, and 7.3% had someone living alone who was 65 years of age or older. The average household size was 2.65 and the average family size was 2.99.

In the township, the population was spread out, with 21.5% under the age of 18, 13.2% from 18 to 24, 33.3% from 25 to 44, 22.5% from 45 to 64, and 9.5% who were 65 years of age or older. The median age was 35 years. For every 100 females, there were 137.8 males. For every 100 females age 18 and over, there were 152.8 males.

The median income for a household in the township was $40,250, and the median income for a family was $41,538. Males had a median income of $37,813 versus $24,063 for females. The per capita income for the township was $13,563. About 5.2% of families and 4.3% of the population were below the poverty line, including 3.1% of those under age 18 and none of those age 65 or over.
