= Brook Park Township, Pine County, Minnesota =

Brook Park Township, Minnesota
- Township
- Location within the state of Minnesota Brook Park Township, Minnesota (the United States)
- Coordinates: 45°56′44″N 93°5′10″W
- Country: United States
- State: Minnesota
- County: Pine

Area
  - Total: 30.1 sq mi (78.0 km^{2})
  - Land: 30.1 sq mi (78.0 km^{2})
  - Water: 0 sq mi (0.0 km^{2})
- Elevation: 1,030 ft (314 m)

Population (2000)
  - Total: 495
  - Density: 16/sq mi (6.3/km^{2})
- Time zone: UTC-6 (Central (CST))
  - Summer (DST): UTC-5 (CDT)
- ZIP code: 55007
- Area code: 320
- FIPS code: 27-08002
- GNIS feature ID: 0663675

Brook Park Township is a township in Pine County, Minnesota, United States. The population was 495 at the 2000 census.

== Geography ==
According to the United States Census Bureau, the township has a total area of 30.1 square miles (78 km^{2}), all land.

== Demographics ==
As of the census of 2000, there were 495 people, 186 households, and 138 families residing in the township. The population density was 16.4 inhabitants per square mile (6.3/km^{2}). There were 223 housing units at an average density of 7.4 per square mile (2.9/km^{2}). The racial makeup of the township was 97.98% White, 0.61% African American, 1.01% Native American, and 0.40% from two or more races. Hispanic or Latino of any race were 0.40% of the population.

There were 186 households, out of which 33.3% had children under the age of 18 living with them, 55.4% were married couples living together, 11.8% had a female householder with no husband present, and 25.8% were non-families. 19.9% of all households were made up of individuals, and 8.6% had someone living alone who was 65 years of age or older. The average household size was 2.66 and the average family size was 3.00.

In the township the population was spread out, with 29.3% under the age of 18, 7.9% from 18 to 24, 28.9% from 25 to 44, 22.4% from 45 to 64, and 11.5% who were 65 years of age or older. The median age was 38 years. For every 100 females, there were 104.5 males. For every 100 females age 18 and over, there were 109.6 males.

The median income for a household in the township was $41,818, and the median income for a family was $48,015. Males had a median income of $37,386 versus $23,929 for females. The per capita income for the township was $15,128. About 8.4% of families and 12.4% of the population were below the poverty line, including 18.5% of those under age 18 and 12.8% of those age 65 or over.
