= Sandstone Township, Pine County, Minnesota =

Sandstone Township, Minnesota
- Township
- Location within the state of Minnesota Sandstone Township, Minnesota (the United States)
- Coordinates: 46°5′59″N 92°48′3″W
- Country: United States
- State: Minnesota
- County: Pine

Area
  - Total: 60.8 sq mi (157.6 km^{2})
  - Land: 60.7 sq mi (157.2 km^{2})
  - Water: 0.15 sq mi (0.4 km^{2})
- Elevation: 1,063 ft (324 m)

Population (2000)
  - Total: 1,614
  - Density: 27/sq mi (10.3/km^{2})
- Time zone: UTC-6 (Central (CST))
  - Summer (DST): UTC-5 (CDT)
- ZIP code: 55072
- Area code: 320
- FIPS code: 27-58414
- GNIS feature ID: 0665547
- Website: https://www.sandstonetownship.com/

Sandstone Township is a township in Pine County, Minnesota, United States. The population was 1,614 at the 2000 census.

Sandstone Township was named for sandstone outcroppings near the Kettle River.

== Geography ==
According to the United States Census Bureau, the township has a total area of 60.9 square miles (157.6 km^{2}), of which 60.7 square miles (157.2 km^{2}) is land and 0.2 square mile (0.4 km^{2}) (0.26%) is water.

== Demographics ==
As of the census of 2000, there were 1,614 people, 278 households, and 211 families residing in the township. The population density was 26.6 inhabitants per square mile (10.3/km^{2}). There were 358 housing units at an average density of 5.9/sq mi (2.3/km^{2}). The racial makeup of the township was 75.71% White, 13.69% African American, 8.12% Native American, 0.87% Asian, 0.06% Pacific Islander, 0.31% from other races, and 1.24% from two or more races. Hispanic or Latino of any race were 14.25% of the population.

There were 278 households, out of which 35.6% had children under the age of 18 living with them, 68.7% were married couples living together, 4.7% had a female householder with no husband present, and 24.1% were non-families. 21.6% of all households were made up of individuals, and 8.6% had someone living alone who was 65 years of age or older. The average household size was 2.76 and the average family size was 3.21.

In the township the population was spread out, with 14.1% under the age of 18, 9.3% from 18 to 24, 49.2% from 25 to 44, 21.9% from 45 to 64, and 5.5% who were 65 years of age or older. The median age was 36 years. For every 100 females, there were 341.0 males. For every 100 females age 18 and over, there were 427.0 males.

The median income for a household in the township was $45,250, and the median income for a family was $53,438. Males had a median income of $29,401 versus $24,583 for females. The per capita income for the township was $18,193. About 3.5% of families and 7.7% of the population were below the poverty line, including 9.0% of those under age 18 and 10.7% of those age 65 or over.
