= Hinckley Township, Pine County, Minnesota =

Hinckley Township, Minnesota
- Township
- Location within the state of Minnesota Hinckley Township, Minnesota (the United States)
- Coordinates: 46°0′52″N 92°59′8″W
- Country: United States
- State: Minnesota
- County: Pine

Area
  - Total: 35.8 sq mi (92.8 km^{2})
  - Land: 35.8 sq mi (92.8 km^{2})
  - Water: 0 sq mi (0.0 km^{2})
- Elevation: 1,050 ft (320 m)

Population (2000)
  - Total: 820
  - Density: 23/sq mi (8.8/km^{2})
- Time zone: UTC-6 (Central (CST))
  - Summer (DST): UTC-5 (CDT)
- ZIP code: 55037
- Area code: 320
- FIPS code: 27-29312
- GNIS feature ID: 0664484
- Website: https://www.hinckleymntwp.com/

Hinckley Township is a township in Pine County, Minnesota, United States. The population was 820 at the 2000 census.

== Geography ==
According to the United States Census Bureau, the township has a total area of 35.8 square miles (93 km^{2}), all land.

== History ==
Hinckley Township was organized in 1872, and named for Isaac Hinckley, president of the Philadelphia, Wilmington and Baltimore Railroad.

== Demographics ==
As of the census of 2000, there were 820 people, 297 households, and 220 families residing in the township. The population density was 22.9 inhabitants per square mile (8.8/km^{2}). There were 345 housing units at an average density of 9.6 per square mile (3.7/km^{2}). The racial makeup of the township was 95.98% White, 0.12% African American, 1.22% Native American, 0.49% Pacific Islander, 0.37% from other races, and 1.83% from two or more races. Hispanic or Latino of any race were 0.98% of the population.

There were 297 households, out of which 39.4% had children under the age of 18 living with them, 58.9% were married couples living together, 8.4% had a female householder with no husband present, and 25.6% were non-families. 19.5% of all households were made up of individuals, and 5.4% had someone living alone who was 65 years of age or older. The average household size was 2.76 and the average family size was 3.13.

In the township the population was spread out, with 30.5% under the age of 18, 8.3% from 18 to 24, 26.3% from 25 to 44, 26.1% from 45 to 64, and 8.8% who were 65 years of age or older. The median age was 37 years. For every 100 females, there were 108.1 males. For every 100 females age 18 and over, there were 102.1 males.

The median income for a household in the township was $38,500, and the median income for a family was $42,639. Males had a median income of $31,146 versus $23,750 for females. The per capita income for the township was $15,118. About 8.3% of families and 12.9% of the population were below the poverty line, including 17.0% of those under age 18 and 14.8% of those age 65 or over.
