= Crosby Township, Pine County, Minnesota =

Crosby Township, Minnesota
- Township
- Location within the state of Minnesota Crosby Township, Minnesota (the United States)
- Coordinates: 45°56′6″N 92°37′48″W
- Country: United States
- State: Minnesota
- County: Pine

Area
  - Total: 44.3 sq mi (114.8 km^{2})
  - Land: 43.5 sq mi (112.7 km^{2})
  - Water: 0.81 sq mi (2.1 km^{2})
- Elevation: 899 ft (274 m)

Population (2000)
  - Total: 97
  - Density: 2.3/sq mi (0.9/km^{2})
- Time zone: UTC-6 (Central (CST))
  - Summer (DST): UTC-5 (CDT)
- FIPS code: 27-13942
- GNIS feature ID: 0663896

Crosby Township is a township in Pine County, Minnesota, United States. The population was 97 at the 2000 census.

Crosby Township was named for Ira Crosby, an early settler.

== Geography ==
According to the United States Census Bureau, the township has a total area of 44.3 square miles (115 km^{2}), of which 43.5 square miles (113 km^{2}) is land and 0.8 square miles (2.1 km^{2}) (1.83%) is water.

== Demographics ==
As of the census of 2000, there were 97 people, 39 households, and 23 families residing in the township. The population density was 2.2 people per square mile (0.9/km^{2}). There were 77 housing units at an average density of 1.8/sq mi (0.7/km^{2}). The racial makeup of the township was 97.94% White, 1.03% Native American and 1.03% Asian.

There were 39 households, out of which 33.3% had children under the age of 18 living with them, 51.3% were married couples living together, 2.6% had a female householder with no husband present, and 38.5% were non-families. 33.3% of all households were made up of individuals, and 15.4% had someone living alone who was 65 years of age or older. The average household size was 2.49 and the average family size was 3.29.

In the township the population was spread out, with 27.8% under the age of 18, 8.2% from 18 to 24, 24.7% from 25 to 44, 18.6% from 45 to 64, and 20.6% who were 65 years of age or older. The median age was 39 years. For every 100 females, there were 110.9 males. For every 100 females age 18 and over, there were 125.8 males.

The median income for a household in the township was $50,313, and the median income for a family was $63,750. Males had a median income of $47,813 versus $23,125 for females. The per capita income for the township was $22,159. There were no families and 6.9% of the population living below the poverty line, including no under eighteens and 23.1% of those over 64.
