= Bruno Township, Pine County, Minnesota =

Bruno Township, Minnesota
- Township
- Location within the state of Minnesota Bruno Township, Minnesota (the United States)
- Coordinates: 46°17′33″N 92°37′10″W
- Country: United States
- State: Minnesota
- County: Pine

Area
  - Total: 34.9 sq mi (90.5 km^{2})
  - Land: 34.9 sq mi (90.4 km^{2})
  - Water: 0.039 sq mi (0.1 km^{2})
- Elevation: 1,210 ft (370 m)

Population (2000)
  - Total: 179
  - Density: 5.2/sq mi (2/km^{2})
- Time zone: UTC-6 (Central (CST))
  - Summer (DST): UTC-5 (CDT)
- ZIP code: 55712
- Area code: 320
- FIPS code: 27-08308
- GNIS feature ID: 0663690

Bruno Township is a township in Pine County, Minnesota, United States. The population was 179 at the 2000 census.

== Geography ==
According to the United States Census Bureau, the township has a total area of 35.0 square miles (91 km^{2}), of which 34.9 square miles (90 km^{2}) is land and 0.04 square miles (0.10 km^{2}) (0.09%) is water.

== Demographics ==
As of the census of 2000, there were 179 people, 65 households, and 46 families residing in the township. The population density was 5.1 inhabitants per square mile (2.0/km^{2}). There were 145 housing units at an average density of 4.2 per square mile (1.6/km^{2}). The racial makeup of the township was 95.53% White, 0.56% African American, 2.79% Native American, 0.56% Asian, and 0.56% from two or more races. Hispanic or Latino of any race were 0.56% of the population.

There were 65 households, out of which 30.8% had children under the age of 18 living with them, 61.5% were married couples living together, 4.6% had a female householder with no husband present, and 27.7% were non-families. 24.6% of all households were made up of individuals, and 10.8% had someone living alone who was 65 years of age or older. The average household size was 2.75 and the average family size was 3.28.

In the township the population was spread out, with 27.9% under the age of 18, 5.6% from 18 to 24, 25.7% from 25 to 44, 25.1% from 45 to 64, and 15.6% who were 65 years of age or older. The median age was 40 years. For every 100 females, there were 129.5 males. For every 100 females age 18 and over, there were 122.4 males.

The median income for a household in the township was $28,750, and the median income for a family was $24,063. Males had a median income of $22,917 versus $23,750 for females. The per capita income for the township was $13,490. About 29.0% of families and 33.3% of the population were below the poverty line, including 91.7% of those under the age of eighteen and 8.0% of those 65 or over.
