= Rock Creek, Minnesota =

City in Minnesota, United States

Rock Creek
- City
- Logo

- Location of the city of Rock Creek within Pine County, Minnesota
- Coordinates: 45°45′38″N 92°54′32″W
- Country: United States
- State: Minnesota
- County: Pine
- Incorporated: November 4, 1970

Government
  - Type: Mayor
  - Mayor: Dick Johnson | Since 2019
  - Past Mayors: 2017 - 2018 | Craig Saari 2013 - 2016 | E.R. Stevens Jr. (Skip) 2011 - 2012 | Steve Olson 1997 - 2002 | Dennis Bonk 1991 - 1996 | Erling Olson 1985 - 1990 | Russell Martinson Jr. 1977 - 1984 | Roger Cummings 1971 - 1976 | Lawrence Petersen

Area
  - Total: 43.32 sq mi (112.20 km^{2})
  - Land: 43.01 sq mi (111.40 km^{2})
  - Water: 0.31 sq mi (0.80 km^{2})
- Elevation: 929 ft (283 m)

Population (2020)
  - Total: 1,682
  - Density: 39/sq mi (15.1/km^{2})
  - Demonym: Rock Creekite
- Time zone: UTC-6 (Central (CST))
  - Summer (DST): UTC-5 (CDT)
- ZIP code: 55067
- Area code: 320
- FIPS code: 27-54934
- GNIS feature ID: 2396396
- Website: cityofrockcreek.org

Rock Creek is a city in Pine County, Minnesota, United States. The population was 1,682 at the 2020 census. Portions of the Mille Lacs Indian Reservation are located within Rock Creek.

Interstate 35 and Minnesota State Highway 70 are two of the main routes in the community. Rock Creek is mostly a rural area, made up of farm lands.

== Geography ==
According to the United States Census Bureau, the city has a total area of 43.32 square miles (112.20 km^{2}), of which 43.01 square miles (111.40 km^{2}) is land and 0.31 square miles (0.80 km^{2}) is water. It is by far the largest city by area in Pine County.

== Demographics ==
Historical population
Census	Pop.	Note	%±
1980	890		—
1990	1,040		16.9%
2000	1,119		7.6%
2010	1,628		45.5%
2020	1,682		3.3%
U.S. Decennial Census

=== 2020 census ===
As of the 2020 census, Rock Creek had a population of 1,682. The median age was 40.3 years. 24.1% of residents were under the age of 18 and 14.4% of residents were 65 years of age or older. For every 100 females there were 114.0 males, and for every 100 females age 18 and over there were 113.7 males age 18 and over.

0.0% of residents lived in urban areas, while 100.0% lived in rural areas.

There were 619 households in Rock Creek, of which 32.6% had children under the age of 18 living in them. Of all households, 58.2% were married-couple households, 20.2% were households with a male householder and no spouse or partner present, and 11.6% were households with a female householder and no spouse or partner present. About 20.3% of all households were made up of individuals and 6.6% had someone living alone who was 65 years of age or older.

There were 657 housing units, of which 5.8% were vacant. The homeowner vacancy rate was 0.5% and the rental vacancy rate was 4.2%.

Racial composition as of the 2020 census
Race	Number	Percent
White	1,557	92.6%
Black or African American	11	0.7%
American Indian and Alaska Native	18	1.1%
Asian	23	1.4%
Native Hawaiian and Other Pacific Islander	0	0.0%
Some other race	6	0.4%
Two or more races	67	4.0%
Hispanic or Latino (of any race)	32	1.9%

=== 2010 census ===
As of the census of 2010, there were 1,628 people, 582 households, and 441 families living in the city. The population density was 37.9 inhabitants per square mile (14.6/km^{2}). There were 635 housing units at an average density of 14.8 per square mile (5.7/km^{2}). The racial makeup of the city was 97.0% White, 0.4% African American, 0.7% Native American, 0.6% Asian, 0.1% from other races, and 1.2% from two or more races. Hispanic or Latino of any race were 1.1% of the population.

There were 582 households, of which 36.3% had children under the age of 18 living with them, 61.9% were married couples living together, 7.0% had a female householder with no husband present, 6.9% had a male householder with no wife present, and 24.2% were non-families. 17.2% of all households were made up of individuals, and 5.2% had someone living alone who was 65 years of age or older. The average household size was 2.76 and the average family size was 3.05.

The median age in the city was 39.1 years. 25.6% of residents were under the age of 18; 7.1% were between the ages of 18 and 24; 26.1% were from 25 to 44; 30.4% were from 45 to 64; and 10.7% were 65 years of age or older. The gender makeup of the city was 52.6% male and 47.4% female.

=== 2000 census ===
As of the census of 2000, there were 1,119 people, 389 households, and 301 families living in the city. The population density was 26.0 inhabitants per square mile (10.0/km^{2}). There were 417 housing units at an average density of 9.7 per square mile (3.7/km^{2}). The racial makeup of the city was 98.30% White, 0.09% African American, 0.80% Native American, 0.45% Asian, and 0.36% from two or more races. Hispanic or Latino of any race were 0.45% of the population.

There were 389 households, out of which 37.8% had children under the age of 18 living with them, 66.3% were married couples living together, 6.7% had a female householder with no husband present, and 22.4% were non-families. 15.7% of all households were made up of individuals, and 5.4% had someone living alone who was 65 years of age or older. The average household size was 2.88 and the average family size was 3.24.

In the city, the population was spread out, with 30.5% under the age of 18, 7.0% from 18 to 24, 28.4% from 25 to 44, 24.2% from 45 to 64, and 9.9% who were 65 years of age or older. The median age was 36 years. For every 100 females, there were 109.9 males. For every 100 females age 18 and over, there were 109.1 males.

The median income for a household in the city was $45,000, and the median income for a family was $48,482. Males had a median income of $33,523 versus $20,391 for females. The per capita income for the city was $17,281. About 6.8% of families and 11.5% of the population were below the poverty line, including 13.2% of those under age 18 and 12.9% of those age 65 or over.
