= Royalton Township, Pine County, Minnesota =

Royalton Township, Minnesota
- Township
- Location within the state of Minnesota Royalton Township, Minnesota (the United States)
- Coordinates: 45°47′N 93°5′W
- Country: United States
- State: Minnesota
- County: Pine

Area
  - Total: 34.8 sq mi (90.1 km^{2})
  - Land: 34.4 sq mi (89.0 km^{2})
  - Water: 0.46 sq mi (1.2 km^{2})
- Elevation: 1,001 ft (305 m)

Population (2000)
  - Total: 976
  - Density: 28/sq mi (11/km^{2})
- Time zone: UTC-6 (Central (CST))
  - Summer (DST): UTC-5 (CDT)
- FIPS code: 27-56194
- GNIS feature ID: 0665484
- Website: royaltontownshipmn.gov

Royalton Township is a township in Pine County, Minnesota, United States. The population was 976 at the 2000 census.

Royalton Township was named for Royal C. Gray, a pioneer settler.

== Geography ==
According to the United States Census Bureau, the township has a total area of 34.8 square miles (90.1 km^{2}), of which 34.3 square miles (88.9 km^{2}) is land and 0.4 square mile (1.2 km^{2}) (1.29%) is water.

== Demographics ==
As of the census of 2000, there were 976 people, 340 households, and 266 families residing in the township. The population density was 28.4 inhabitants per square mile (11.0/km^{2}). There were 419 housing units at an average density of 12.2/sq mi (4.7/km^{2}). The racial makeup of the township was 98.36% White, 0.51% African American, 0.31% Native American, 0.31% Asian, 0.10% from other races, and 0.41% from two or more races. Hispanic or Latino of any race were 0.82% of the population.

There were 340 households, out of which 37.9% had children under the age of 18 living with them, 66.8% were married couples living together, 6.2% had a female householder with no husband present, and 21.5% were non-families. 17.9% of all households were made up of individuals, and 7.4% had someone living alone who was 65 years of age or older. The average household size was 2.85 and the average family size was 3.20.

In the township the population was spread out, with 29.9% under the age of 18, 7.1% from 18 to 24, 29.7% from 25 to 44, 22.5% from 45 to 64, and 10.8% who were 65 years of age or older. The median age was 37 years. For every 100 females, there were 110.3 males. For every 100 females age 18 and over, there were 109.8 males.

The median income for a household in the township was $43,000, and the median income for a family was $49,318. Males had a median income of $33,636 versus $28,750 for females. The per capita income for the township was $18,729. About 1.9% of families and 4.6% of the population were below the poverty line, including none of those under age 18 and 9.1% of those age 65 or over.
