= Pine City Township, Pine County, Minnesota =

Pine City Township, Minnesota
- Township
- Location within the state of Minnesota Pine City Township, Minnesota (the United States)
- Coordinates: 45°49′20″N 92°54′50″W
- Country: United States
- State: Minnesota
- County: Pine

Area
  - Total: 36.6 sq mi (94.8 km^{2})
  - Land: 35.7 sq mi (92.5 km^{2})
  - Water: 0.89 sq mi (2.3 km^{2})
- Elevation: 961 ft (293 m)

Population (2000)
  - Total: 1,249
  - Density: 35/sq mi (13.5/km^{2})
- Time zone: UTC-6 (Central (CST))
  - Summer (DST): UTC-5 (CDT)
- ZIP code: 55063
- Area code: 320
- FIPS code: 27-51082
- GNIS feature ID: 0665302
- Website: https://www.pinecitytownshipmn.gov/

Pine City Township is a township in Pine County, Minnesota, United States, located south and east of the city of Pine City. The township population was 1,249 at the 2000 census.

Pine City Township was organized in 1874.

== Geography ==
According to the United States Census Bureau, the township has a total area of 36.6 square miles (94.8 km^{2}), of which 35.7 square miles (92.5 km^{2}) is land and 0.9 square mile (2.3 km^{2}) (2.40%) is water.

== Demographics ==
As of the census of 2000, there were 1,249 people, 472 households, and 346 families residing in the township. The population density was 35.0 inhabitants per square mile (13.5/km^{2}). There were 663 housing units at an average density of 18.6/sq mi (7.2/km^{2}). The racial makeup of the township was 97.60% White, 0.16% African American, 1.20% Native American, 0.40% Asian, 0.08% from other races, and 0.56% from two or more races. Hispanic or Latino of any race were 0.32% of the population.

There were 472 households, out of which 32.2% had children under the age of 18 living with them, 63.3% were married couples living together, 5.5% had a female householder with no husband present, and 26.5% were non-families. 20.1% of all households were made up of individuals, and 6.6% had someone living alone who was 65 years of age or older. The average household size was 2.61 and the average family size was 3.01.

In the township the population was spread out, with 24.7% under the age of 18, 6.3% from 18 to 24, 28.6% from 25 to 44, 26.8% from 45 to 64, and 13.5% who were 65 years of age or older. The median age was 40 years. For every 100 females, there were 111.0 males. For every 100 females age 18 and over, there were 111.7 males.

The median income for a household in the township was $47,500, and the median income for a family was $52,143. Males had a median income of $37,083 versus $22,250 for females. The per capita income for the township was $20,074. About 2.6% of families and 4.0% of the population were below the poverty line, including 0.6% of those under age 18 and 6.5% of those age 65 or over.
