= Windemere Township, Pine County, Minnesota =

Windemere Township: Minnesota
- Township
- Location within the state of Minnesota Windemere Township: Minnesota (the United States)
- Coordinates: 46°23′19″N 92°45′37″W
- Country: United States
- State: Minnesota
- County: Pine

Area
  - Total: 35.8 sq mi (92.6 km^{2})
  - Land: 30.5 sq mi (79.0 km^{2})
  - Water: 5.3 sq mi (13.6 km^{2})
- Elevation: 1,102 ft (336 m)

Population (2000)
  - Total: 1,489
  - Density: 49/sq mi (18.8/km^{2})
- Time zone: UTC-6 (Central (CST))
  - Summer (DST): UTC-5 (CDT)
- FIPS code: 27-70780
- GNIS feature ID: 0666013
- Website: https://windemeretownship.com/

Windemere Township is a township in Pine County, Minnesota, United States. The population was 1,489 at the 2000 census.

Windemere Township was organized in 1882, and named after the Windermere lake, in England.

== Geography ==
According to the United States Census Bureau, the township has a total area of 35.8 square miles (92.6 km^{2}), of which 30.5 square miles (79.0 km^{2}) is land and 5.2 square miles (13.6 km^{2}) (14.68%) is water.

== Demographics ==
As of the census of 2000, there were 1,489 people, 640 households, and 455 families residing in the township. The population density was 48.8 inhabitants per square mile (18.8/km^{2}). There were 1,347 housing units at an average density of 44.1 per square mile (17.0/km^{2}). The racial makeup of the township was 98.39% White, 0.20% Native American, 0.20% Asian, 0.40% from other races, and 0.81% from two or more races. Hispanic or Latino of any race were 0.47% of the population.

There were 640 households, out of which 23.6% had children under the age of 18 living with them, 61.3% were married couples living together, 6.3% had a female householder with no husband present, and 28.9% were non-families. 24.4% of all households were made up of individuals, and 10.0% had someone living alone who was 65 years of age or older. The average household size was 2.33 and the average family size was 2.72.

In the township the population was spread out, with 20.3% under the age of 18, 5.4% from 18 to 24, 21.8% from 25 to 44, 31.7% from 45 to 64, and 20.8% who were 65 years of age or older. The median age was 46 years. For every 100 females, there were 107.1 males. For every 100 females age 18 and over, there were 106.4 males.

The median income for a household in the township was $43,625, and the median income for a family was $49,583. Males had a median income of $38,977 versus $28,194 for females. The per capita income for the township was $21,346. About 7.1% of families and 7.7% of the population were below the poverty line, including 5.4% of those under age 18 and 9.3% of those age 65 or over.
