= Kerrick Township, Pine County, Minnesota =

Kerrick Township, Minnesota
- Township
- Location within the state of Minnesota Kerrick Township, Minnesota (the United States)
- Coordinates: 46°22′43″N 92°36′44″W
- Country: United States
- State: Minnesota
- County: Pine

Area
  - Total: 34.9 sq mi (90.3 km^{2})
  - Land: 33.9 sq mi (87.9 km^{2})
  - Water: 0.93 sq mi (2.4 km^{2})
- Elevation: 1,132 ft (345 m)

Population (2000)
  - Total: 272
  - Density: 8.0/sq mi (3.1/km^{2})
- Time zone: UTC-6 (Central (CST))
  - Summer (DST): UTC-5 (CDT)
- ZIP code: 55756
- Area code: 218
- FIPS code: 27-32930
- GNIS feature ID: 0664621

Kerrick Township is a township in Pine County, Minnesota, United States. The population was 272 at the 2000 census.

Kerrick Township was named for Cassius M. Kerrick, a railroad engineer.

== Geography ==
According to the United States Census Bureau, the township has a total area of 34.9 square miles (90 km^{2}), of which 33.9 square miles (88 km^{2}) is land and 0.9 square miles (2.3 km^{2}) (2.70%) is water.

== Demographics ==
At the 2000 census, there were 272 people, 121 households and 78 families residing in the township. The population density was 8.0 per square mile (3.1/km^{2}). There were 218 housing units at an average density of 6.4/sq mi (2.5/km^{2}). The racial makeup of the township was 98.53% White, 0.74% Native American, and 0.74% from two or more races.

There were 121 households, of which 21.5% had children under the age of 18 living with them, 56.2% were married couples living together, 5.8% had a female householder with no husband present, and 35.5% were non-families. 29.8% of all households were made up of individuals, and 10.7% had someone living alone who was 65 years of age or older. The average household size was 2.25 and the average family size was 2.82.

21.0% of the population were under the age of 18, 6.3% from 18 to 24, 25.7% from 25 to 44, 27.9% from 45 to 64, and 19.1% who were 65 years of age or older. The median age was 44 years. For every 100 females, there were 114.2 males. For every 100 females age 18 and over, there were 112.9 males.

The median household income was $36,563 and the median family income was $45,000. Males had a median income of $32,143 and females $32,222. The per capita income for the township was $18,478. About 9.1% of families and 13.6% of the population were below the poverty line, including 12.7% of those under the age of eighteen and 8.6% of those 65 or over.
