= Brook Park, Minnesota =

City in Minnesota, United States

Brook Park
- City
- Location of the city of Brook Park within Pine County, Minnesota
- Coordinates: 45°56′54″N 93°4′22″W
- Country: United States
- State: Minnesota
- County: Pine
- Incorporated: October 1, 1919

Government
  - Mayor: Terry Lakin

Area
  - Total: 0.99 sq mi (2.57 km^{2})
  - Land: 0.99 sq mi (2.57 km^{2})
  - Water: 0 sq mi (0.00 km^{2})
- Elevation: 1,024 ft (312 m)

Population (2020)
  - Total: 132
  - Density: 132.8/sq mi (51.28/km^{2})
  - Demonym: Brook Parker
- Time zone: UTC-6 (Central (CST))
  - Summer (DST): UTC-5 (CDT)
- ZIP code: 55007
- Area code: 320
- FIPS code: 27-07984
- GNIS feature ID: 2393425

Brook Park is a city in Pine County, Minnesota, United States. The population was 132 at the 2020 census.

Minnesota State Highways 23 and 107 are two of the main routes in the community.

== Geography ==
According to the United States Census Bureau, the city has a total area of 1.01 square miles (2.62 km^{2}), all land.

Pokegama Creek flows nearby.

== Demographics ==
Historical population
Census	Pop.	Note	%±
1920	167		—
1930	159		−4.8%
1940	160		0.6%
1950	148		−7.5%
1960	108		−27.0%
1970	113		4.6%
1980	93		−17.7%
1990	125		34.4%
2000	156		24.8%
2010	139		−10.9%
2020	132		−5.0%
U.S. Decennial Census

=== 2010 census ===
As of the census of 2010, there were 139 people, 50 households, and 39 families living in the city. The population density was 137.6 inhabitants per square mile (53.1/km^{2}). There were 60 housing units at an average density of 59.4 per square mile (22.9/km^{2}). The racial makeup of the city was 99.3% White and 0.7% African American.

There were 50 households, of which 42.0% had children under the age of 18 living with them, 42.0% were married couples living together, 16.0% had a female householder with no husband present, 20.0% had a male householder with no wife present, and 22.0% were non-families. 18.0% of all households were made up of individuals, and 4% had someone living alone who was 65 years of age or older. The average household size was 2.78 and the average family size was 3.05.

The median age in the city was 35.1 years. 25.9% of residents were under the age of 18; 11.6% were between the ages of 18 and 24; 20.2% were from 25 to 44; 29.5% were from 45 to 64; and 12.9% were 65 years of age or older. The gender makeup of the city was 48.9% male and 51.1% female.

=== 2000 census ===
As of the census of 2000, there were 156 people, 57 households, and 40 families living in the city. The population density was 152.5 inhabitants per square mile (58.9/km^{2}). There were 61 housing units at an average density of 59.7 per square mile (23.1/km^{2}). The racial makeup of the city was 97.44% White and 2.56% African American.

There were 57 households, out of which 36.8% had children under the age of 18 living with them, 40.4% were married couples living together, 21.1% had a female householder with no husband present, and 29.8% were non-families. 19.3% of all households were made up of individuals, and none had someone living alone who was 65 years of age or older. The average household size was 2.74 and the average family size was 3.00.

In the city, the population was spread out, with 32.1% under the age of 18, 8.3% from 18 to 24, 30.1% from 25 to 44, 23.7% from 45 to 64, and 5.8% who were 65 years of age or older. The median age was 31 years. For every 100 females, there were 108.0 males. For every 100 females age 18 and over, there were 100.0 males.

The median income for a household in the city was $43,750, and the median income for a family was $45,625. Males had a median income of $29,063 versus $16,250 for females. The per capita income for the city was $14,353. About 8.3% of families and 13.5% of the population were below the poverty line, including 23.1% of those under the age of eighteen and none of those 65 or over.

== History ==
Founded as a lumber camp in the 1870s, Brook Park was incorporated as a township on April 18, 1894; and as a village on October 1, 1919. On September 1, 1894, the township and surrounding area were devastated in the Great Hinckley Fire. At the time, the town of Brook Park was known as Pokegama. A monument to the Brook Park victims of the fire is located in the town cemetery just southwest of town, marking a mass grave of 23 unidentified victims.

== Education ==
It is a part of Hinckley-Finlayson Public Schools. The school district was established in 1994 through the consolidation of the Hinckley and Finlayson school districts.
