= Nickerson Township, Pine County, Minnesota =

Nickerson Township, Minnesota
- Township
- Location within the state of Minnesota Nickerson Township, Minnesota (the United States)
- Coordinates: 46°24′12″N 92°30′0″W
- Country: United States
- State: Minnesota
- County: Pine

Area
  - Total: 74.5 sq mi (192.9 km^{2})
  - Land: 73.9 sq mi (191.4 km^{2})
  - Water: 0.58 sq mi (1.5 km^{2})
- Elevation: 1,220 ft (372 m)

Population (2000)
  - Total: 154
  - Density: 2.1/sq mi (0.8/km^{2})
- Time zone: UTC-6 (Central (CST))
  - Summer (DST): UTC-5 (CDT)
- FIPS code: 27-46132
- GNIS feature ID: 0665119

Nickerson Township is a township in Pine County, Minnesota, United States. The population was 154 at the 2000 census.

Nickerson Township was named for John Quincy Adams Nickerson, a railroad promoter.

== Geography ==
According to the United States Census Bureau, the township has a total area of 74.5 square miles (192.9 km^{2}), of which 73.9 square miles (191.3 km^{2}) is land and 0.6 square mile (1.5 km^{2}) (0.78%) is water.

== Demographics ==
As of the census of 2000, there were 154 people, 60 households, and 37 families residing in the township. The population density was 2.1 people per square mile (0.8/km^{2}). There were 117 housing units at an average density of 1.6/sq mi (0.6/km^{2}). The racial makeup of the township was 94.81% White, 2.60% African American, 0.65% Asian, and 1.95% from two or more races. Hispanic or Latino of any race were 0.65% of the population.

There were 60 households, out of which 35.0% had children under the age of 18 living with them, 50.0% were married couples living together, 6.7% had a female householder with no husband present, and 36.7% were non-families. 35.0% of all households were made up of individuals, and 11.7% had someone living alone who was 65 years of age or older. The average household size was 2.57 and the average family size was 3.26.

In the township the population was spread out, with 29.2% under the age of 18, 6.5% from 18 to 24, 23.4% from 25 to 44, 27.3% from 45 to 64, and 13.6% who were 65 years of age or older. The median age was 40 years. For every 100 females, there were 116.9 males. For every 100 females age 18 and over, there were 98.2 males.

The median income for a household in the township was $44,375, and the median income for a family was $53,125. Males had a median income of $36,875 versus $14,375 for females. The per capita income for the township was $16,350. About 5.7% of families and 8.6% of the population were below the poverty line, including none of those under the age of eighteen and 11.1% of those 65 or over.
