= National Register of Historic Places listings in Pine County, Minnesota =

Location of Pine County in Minnesota

This is a list of the National Register of Historic Places listings in Pine County, Minnesota. It is intended to be a complete list of the properties and districts on the National Register of Historic Places in Pine County, Minnesota, United States. The locations of National Register properties and districts for which the latitude and longitude coordinates are included below, may be seen in an online map.

There are 21 properties and districts listed on the National Register in the county, including a National Historic Landmark district. A supplementary list includes three additional sites that were formerly on the National Register.

This National Park Service list is complete through NPS recent listings posted October 16, 2026.

== Current listings ==
	Name on the Register	Image	Date listed	Location	City or town	Description
1	Bethlehem Lutheran Church	Bethlehem Lutheran Church	August 18, 1980 (#80002103)	6318 Kirke Alle; 46°11′17″N 92°46′41″W	Askov	Church built 1914–15 to anchor the Danish American community of Askov, Pine County's most significant ethnic enclave.
2	District No. 74 School	District No. 74 School	June 25, 1992 (#92000820)	48895 Cemetery Rd. 46°08′35″N 92°38′19″W	Danforth Township	Highly intact one-room school built in 1899 and expanded in 1909, representing the typical venue for education in rural Pine County in the first half of the 20th century.
3	John Doboszenski Farmstead	John Doboszenski Farmstead	August 18, 1980 (#80002105)	Off County Highway 43; 46°18′32″N 92°46′12″W	Willow River vicinity	One of the few surviving examples of Pine County's early subsistence farmsteads, established in 1894. Also associated with the initial settlement of the area by Polish immigrants.
4	Hinckley Fire Relief House	Hinckley Fire Relief House	August 18, 1980 (#80002112)	602 Court Ave. 46°07′58″N 92°51′46″W	Sandstone	Rare intact example of the emergency housing built for survivors of the Great Hinckley Fire in 1894, symbolizing one of Minnesota's worst wildfires and the state's humanitarian aid response.
5	Hinckley State Line Marker	Hinckley State Line Marker	September 6, 2002 (#02000935)	Minnesota Highway 48; 46°00′46″N 92°27′00″W	Ogema Township	State entrance sign built 1941–42, encapsulating NPS rustic style and the early roadside developments produced by the Minnesota highway department in partnership with New Deal agencies.
6	Louis Hultgren House and Sand Pit	Louis Hultgren House and Sand Pit	August 18, 1980 (#80002108)	Minnesota Highway 23; 46°20′21″N 92°35′25″W	Kerrick	Circa-1896 house and adjacent molding sand quarry of a Swedish immigrant, associated with an early Pine County industry and the founding of Kerrick.
7	Kettle River Bridge	Kettle River Bridge	June 29, 1998 (#98000687)	Minnesota Highway 123 over the Kettle River; 46°07′44″N 92°51′24″W	Sandstone	Rare Minnesota example of a deck truss bridge, built 1947–48, and further distinguished by unusual cantilevering and hinging features to accommodate a challenging site.
8	Kettle River Sandstone Company Quarry	Kettle River Sandstone Company Quarry	July 18, 1991 (#91000877)	Old Wagon Rd. 46°07′58″N 92°51′28″W	Sandstone	Minnesota's largest late-19th/early-20th-century sandstone quarry, active 1885–1919; the source of local prosperity and an internationally used building material. Now Robinson Park.
9	Peter P. Kilstofte Farmstead	Peter P. Kilstofte Farmstead	August 18, 1980 (#80002109)	County Highway 33; 46°11′50″N 92°47′04″W	Askov	1913 farm noted for its distinctive bungalow house and stone-faced barn and silo, as well as its association with a prominent local building contractor.
10	Minneapolis Trust Company Commercial Building	Minneapolis Trust Company Commercial Building	August 18, 1980 (#80002113)	Main and 4th Sts. 46°07′56″N 92°52′00″W	Sandstone	1894 commercial building connected with the efforts of James J. Hill and his son-in-law Samuel Hill to swiftly rebuild Sandstone after the Great Hinckley Fire. Now the Sandstone History and Art Center.
11	North West Company Post	North West Company Post	August 7, 1972 (#72000679)	12551 Voyageur Ln. 45°49′17″N 93°00′41″W	Pine City vicinity	1804 fur trading post reconstructed on its original site by the Minnesota Historical Society. Now the Snake River Fur Post.
12	Northern Pacific Depot	Northern Pacific Depot	August 18, 1980 (#80002107)	Front St. at Finland Ave. 46°12′02″N 92°54′58″W	Finlayson	Pine County's best surviving example of its small-town train stations—built in 1909—and representative of the essential role of the railways in its settlement.
13	Northern Pacific Depot	Northern Pacific Depot	May 7, 1973 (#73000992)	Old U.S. Route 61 and 1st St., SE. 46°00′54″N 92°56′36″W	Hinckley	Railway station built in 1895 as a duplicate of the original lost in the Great Hinckley Fire, symbolizing the destruction of that event and the seminal state conservation program that it spurred. Now the Hinckley Fire Museum.
14	John A. Oldenburg House	John A. Oldenburg House	December 13, 1978 (#78001556)	Minnesota Highway 18; 46°12′06″N 92°54′53″W	Finlayson	One of the area's most fashionable houses, built circa 1896 for a leading local entrepreneur.
15	Partridge Township Hall	Partridge Township Hall	August 18, 1980 (#80002110)	Kobmagergade; 46°11′23″N 92°46′51″W	Askov	1901 example of the simple, one-room public buildings erected in early Pine County settlements, and a witness to Askov's evolution from a railroad stop to a Danish American colony.
16	Red Clover Land Company Demonstration Farm	Red Clover Land Company Demonstration Farm	August 18, 1980 (#80002106)	Off County Road 32; 46°10′14″N 92°21′02″W	New Dosey Township	Showplace farmstead built circa 1915 by the company instrumental in attracting settlers to eastern Pine County, but whose easy terms prompted many to default and leave within a decade.
17	St. Croix Recreational Demonstration Area	St. Croix Recreational Demonstration Area	January 31, 1997 (#96001594)	30065 St. Croix Park Rd. 45°57′03″N 92°34′12″W	Hinckley vicinity	Recreational Demonstration Area developed 1934–43, a major New Deal undertaking noted for its landscape architecture, social impact, and the state's largest collection of NPS Rustic park facilities (164 contributing properties). Now St. Croix State Park.
18	Sandstone School	Sandstone School	February 7, 1979 (#79001251)	Commercial Ave. between 5th and 6th Sts. 46°07′58″N 92°51′50″W	Sandstone	Sandstone school whose oldest sections date to 1901 and 1910; an exceptional product of local stonecutting and masonry expertise.
19	Arnold Schwyzer Summer House and Farmstead	Arnold Schwyzer Summer House and Farmstead	August 18, 1980 (#80002114)	County Road 17; 46°07′12″N 93°00′07″W	Sandstone vicinity	Summer home and hobby farm developed 1902–1920s, example of the private lake retreats built in Pine County by affluent urbanites. Now the Audubon Center of the North Woods.
20	Stumne Mounds	Stumne Mounds	June 20, 1972 (#72000680)	Address restricted	Pine City vicinity	Linear and conical mounds dating to c. 600 CE.
21	Willow River Rutabaga Warehouse and Processing Plant	Willow River Rutabaga Warehouse and Processing Plant	June 21, 1990 (#90000935)	Off County Highway 61; 46°19′08″N 92°50′27″W	Willow River	Minnesota's only surviving agricultural facility dedicated to storing and processing rutabagas, an important local cash crop. Built 1935–37.

== Former listings ==
	Name on the Register	Image	Date listed	Date removed	Location	City or town	Description
1	Bridge No. 1811 over Kettle River		August 28, 1998 (#98001107)	May 17, 2005	Co. Hwy 33 over Kettle River	Rutledge vicinity	1916 Pratt truss bridge. Demolished in 2004.
2	Cloverton School	Cloverton School	August 18, 1980 (#80002104)	November 1, 2018	County Road 32	New Dosey Township	Large 1920 school reflecting eastern Pine County's short-lived boom years. Demolished in 2010.
3	Pine City Naval Militia Armory		August 18, 1980 (#80002111)	June 4, 2001	1st Avenue	Pine City	1914 armory. Demolished in 2000.

== See also ==
- List of National Historic Landmarks in Minnesota
- National Register of Historic Places listings in Minnesota
