= Arthyde, Minnesota =

Unincorporated community in Minnesota, US

Arthyde
- Unincorporated community
- Location within Minnesota Location within the United States
- Coordinates: 46°21′22″N 93°05′22″W
- Country: United States
- State: Minnesota
- County: Aitkin
- Township: Millward Township
- Elevation: 1,283 ft (391 m)
- Time zone: UTC-6 (Central (CST))
  - Summer (DST): UTC-5 (CDT)
- ZIP code: 56350
- Area code: 218
- GNIS feature ID: 654574

Arthyde is an unincorporated community in Millward Township, Aitkin County, Minnesota, United States. The community is located northeast of McGrath, at the junction of Kestrel Avenue and 230th Lane. Aitkin County Road 2 (220th Street) is nearby.

Nearby places include Pliny, McGrath, Ellson, Denham, Sturgeon Lake, and Willow River.

Arthyde is 16 miles northeast of McGrath, and 15 miles west of Willow River. The boundary line between Aitkin and Pine counties is nearby. The community is located on the edge of the Solana State Forest in the southeast portion of Aitkin County.

== History ==
Arthyde was previously known as Millward. In 1909, it was renamed to honor the names of two pioneer brothers, Arthur (1876-1960) and Clyde Hutchins (1878-1950). The Arthyde Stone House, built around 1922, is listed on the National Register of Historic Places.
