= Ellson, Minnesota =

Ellson
- Unincorporated community
- Location within Minnesota Location within the United States
- Coordinates: 46°19′03″N 93°00′41″W
- Country: United States
- State: Minnesota
- County: Pine
- Township: Bremen Township
- Elevation: 1,250 ft (380 m)
- Time zone: UTC-6 (Central (CST))
  - Summer (DST): UTC-5 (CDT)
- ZIP code: 55735 and 55795
- Area code: 218
- GNIS feature ID: 654690

Ellson is an unincorporated community in Bremen Township, Pine County, Minnesota, United States.

== History ==
Ellson was founded around 1895, and named for Edwin Ellson, Sr., one of the town's promoters. A post office called Ellson was established in 1904, and remained in operation until 1925.

== Geography ==
Ellson is located in the northwestern part of Pine County. The community is located west of Willow River, along Pine County Road 41, near Birch Creek Road, Maple Road and Chokecherry Road. Nearby places include Denham, Willow River, Sturgeon Lake, Rutledge and Pliny. Ellson is five miles south of Denham; and 13 miles east of Pliny. The boundary line between Pine and Aitkin counties is near Ellson.

Little Bremen Creek flows through the community. Ellson is located eight miles west of Willow River and 12 miles southwest of Sturgeon Lake.
