= Great Hinckley Fire =

1894 forest fire in Minnesota, U.S.

Coordinates: 46°0′40″N 92°55′24″W

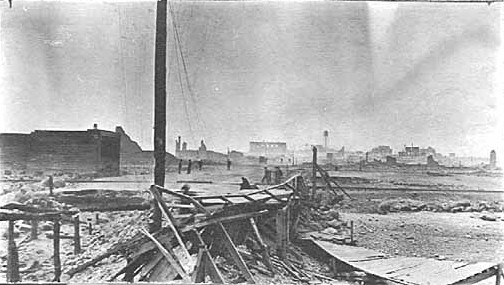
- Date: September 1, 1894; 12:00 - 7:00pm; (CDT)
- Location: Pine County, near Hinckley, Minnesota, US

Statistics
- Burned area: 200,000 acres (810 km^{2})
- Land use: Logging

Impacts
- Deaths: 418+

Ignition
- Cause: Drought

The Great Hinckley Fire was a conflagration in the pine forests of the U.S. state of Minnesota that ignited on September 1, 1894, which burned an area of at least 200,000 acres (810 km^{2}; 310 sq mi) (perhaps more than 250,000 acres [1,000 km^{2}; 390 sq mi]), including the town of Hinckley. The official death count was 418; the actual number of fatalities was likely higher. Other sources put the death toll at 476.

== Description ==
After a two-month summer drought, combined with very high temperatures, several small fires started in the pine forests of Pine County, Minnesota. Two of the fires in particular ignited along the railroad tracks southwest and south of Hinckley, in Quamba and Brown's Hill, respectively. Bog and grass fires, sometimes touched off by steam locomotives, were commonplace in the late-summers of rural Minnesota; the fires' spread apparently was due to the then-common method of lumber harvesting, wherein trees were stripped of their branches in place; these branches littered the ground with flammable debris. Also contributing was a temperature inversion that trapped the gases from the fires. The scattered blazes united into a firestorm.

== September 1, 1894 ==
At noon, a strong wind began to blow, and an ominous cloud of smoke hung over the town. The smoke had been noted earlier that morning, but initially many were not concerned, until a gust of sparks landed in the yard of the Brennan Lumber Company, starting small fires which were quickly extinguished, but worried the employees. Many concerned townsfolk left on the noon train. Indeed, at 1:00pm, Chief John Craig of the Hinckley volunteer fire department rang the fire gong, calling all the town's firemen to the engine house, to prepare for what was suspected to be a mere brush fire. Half an hour later, the wind from the south increased in speed, and the fire began to advance with frightening rapidity toward the town.

At 2:00pm, the first casualties occurred when the firestorm razed the town of Pokegama (today Brook Park) nine miles south of Hinckley, killing 23. Many saved themselves by jumping into a nearby mill pond, into which a burning railroad trestle collapsed, cutting off rail access on the Great Northern Railway between Hinckley and St. Cloud. Fireman Chief Craig instructed Thomas Dunn, Hinckley's telegrapher at the St. Paul & Duluth Railroad depot, to contact nearby Rush City for additional water hoses. As he did, the Pokegama railroad station wired ahead to warn of the approaching firestorm, before the lines were burned through.

By 2:30pm, the volunteer firefighters in Hinckley made their stand on the south edge of town, with 2,000 feet of hose and a steam powered fire cart, engaging spot fires that the main firestorm had thrown ahead of them into the outskirts of town, which caught and began burning structures. Men also began to show up with wagons loaded with barrels of water. At the same time, the small hamlet of Mission Creek just south of Hinckley, was razed by the flaming front. No one was killed, the majority of the town taking cover in a potato field.

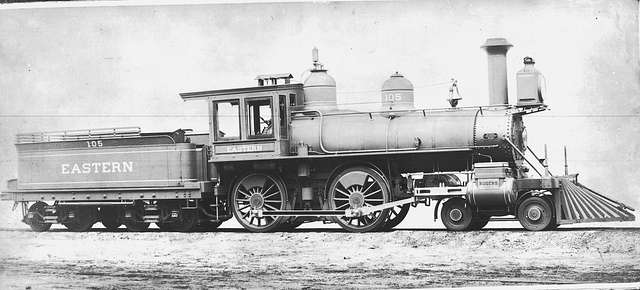
Eastern Minnesota Railway #105 (Ed Barry's Engine)

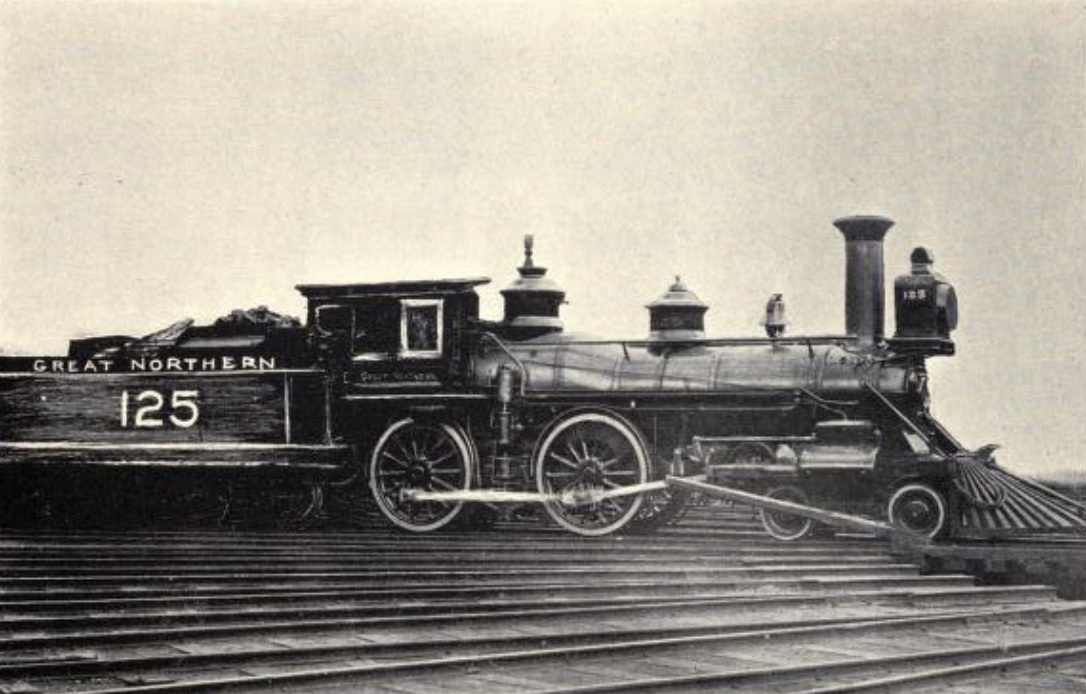
Great Northern Railway #125 (William Best's Engine)

At 2:45pm, the Eastern Railway of Minnesota's Superior-Hinckley freight train came into town from the north. This train consisted of engine #105, three empty boxcars and a caboose. It was being run by engineer Edward Barry, who already sensed that something was wrong. He found the town deserted—everyone was out fighting the fire, which by this point was coming on in a great, solid wall to the east, south, and west, estimated anywhere between 200 feet to four miles high. The entire town itself wasn't burning yet, but a few select buildings and the railyards beyond the Eastern depot were; the ties were on fire, the rails were warping, and the wheels of freight cars fused to the rails. A southbound passenger train bound for Minneapolis consisting of Great Northern engine #125 and six coaches being run by engineer William Best was due in at 3:25pm, and Barry hoped that it would arrive on time.

Even by 3:00pm, with some buildings ablaze, many of Hinckley's residents did not believe the fire would make it past the firebreaks and the railroad embankments and enter the heart of town. 15 minutes later, the last employees of the Brennan Lumber Company to survive fled from the lumberyard; all others who stayed behind for fear of losing their jobs were killed.

Much to Edward Barry's relief, William Best's passenger train was on time, and as it came to a halt at the Eastern station, a small crowd had already gathered to board. By this point, the wind was blowing a full gale, and burning embers showered George Ford, Best's fireman, as he struggled to take on water. The heat was so terrific that Ford was driven three times from the spout, but he kept aware that if the engine ran out of steam, he, the rest of the crew, and all of the passengers would die. Best's conductor, H.D. Powers went into the station to inquire about the conditions of the track south of town. After learning of the warning from the Pokegama train station, he determined the line to be impassable. Powers spotted Barry's freight sitting nearby on a sidetrack and proposed hooking the two trains together, using Best's coaches and Barry's boxcars to carry refugees to safety. Both crews agreed, and Barry reversed off of the sidetrack and attached his engine and cars to the rear coach of William Best's train.

Five minutes later, the fire burned through the hose of the Hinckley fire department's water pumper, rendering it useless. Residents, now realizing that the town was doomed, began a desperate run to save their lives as the rapidly intensifying heat and the roar of the fire approached. Some rushed for the Eastern Minnesota train, aided by Reverend Peter Knudsen (Hinckley's Presbyterian minister) and his wife. Others ran north along the St.P&D and Eastern Minnesota tracks. By 3:45pm, a searing wind was blowing a curtain of dense black smoke, cinders, and firebrands through the dusty street; so great was the radiating heat that many townspeople's clothes caught fire before the main fire even arrived.

== Destruction of Hinckley ==
The temperature rose to at least 2,000 °F (1,100 °C). Barrels of nails melted into one mass.

At 4:00pm, the town "virtually exploded" as any structures not already burning simultaneously burst into flames as the wall of fire leapt forth. Burning balls of gas drifted overhead from the mouth of the flaming front and exploded above the town. To some it seemed that even the very air was on fire, affording most unprepared at least two deep breaths before their lungs were seared and death was certain; the roaring of the fire storm drowned out the desiccated screams of the townspeople. Dense smoke completely hid the Sun, but as buildings took fire they "briefly lit the howling darkness like flashes of lightning". Frame buildings detonated like bundles of fireworks, crumbling or bursting into flames purely from the radiating heat, before any fire even reached them. Some residents escaped by climbing into wells (where some then suffocated due to lack of oxygen), ponds, or the Grindstone River (almost dry from the summer drought). A gravel pit on the southeast side of town, dug by the Eastern Minnesota near their depot for a source of rail ballast, once drew the ire of locals for being an eyesore; now it heralded the survival of hundreds, who, with the goading of Reverend Knutsen, all but threw themselves (and in some cases, their horses and cows) into the few inches of fetid water that had accumulated at the bottom of the pit. The only person who died in the pit had suffered a heart attack from the scene.

Best, now at the rear of the composite rescue train, controlled all the airbrakes for the consist, which saved many; when Barry attempted to leave and began to move the train, Best threw on the airbrakes to stay as long as possible for the fleeing townsfolk. Barry's conductor warned Best that Barry would cut off his engine and leave them behind, but Best was unconvinced, and stood his ground, despite being "constantly implored to go" as Barry repeatedly whistled the signal to leave. By this point, the paint was melting and beginning to run off the sides of the cars, and the ties beneath them were afire. Men, women, children, and animals fell into the streets ablaze just yards from the rescue train. Finally, Best released the brakes and the train advanced. As the train pulled out of the stricken town, Best turned for one final look and saw houses

burning so rapidly that one could see bedroom sets and other contents of the rooms. The fire would seem to burn the sides right off the buildings, revealing the contents in the glare. Buildings seemed to melt rather than burn in the fierce glow.

Barry briefly stopped the train on the other side of the Grindstone River to pick up 40 more refugees. Over a hundred refugees running north on the wagon road toward Sandstone made for the train, but the rails were buckling with heat. With much apprehension, and the fire still advancing, Barry and Best were forced to leave them behind. Some of these refugees then attempted to immerse themselves in a nearby swamp, but due to the drought it was shallow. Unlike in the gravel pit, when the fire caught those sheltering in the middle of the swamp, all 127 present burned to death, the greatest concentrated loss of life of the entire event.

After the departure of the Eastern Minnesota train, a number of citizens took refuge in the St.P&D station nearby. However, when the depot eventually caught fire, everybody inside fled the building with the exception of station agent Thomas Dunn. For several minutes, Dunn valiantly remained at his post manning the telegraph key in the depot, aware that the southbound No. 4 Duluth Limited to Saint Paul was due. He had time to send one final message, "I think I've stayed too long", to the Partridge depot moments before his burning depot collapsed. Sources differ on where his body was found, whether in the rubble of the depot, or down by the Grindstone River. Regardless, Dunn either made no attempt or waited until the last possible moment to make an attempt to escape, and lost his life.

James Root, the engineer of the Duluth Limited, had cautiously approached the town at a reduced speed of 40 miles an hour after traveling through gradually thickening smoke for almost the entire journey. One mile north of Hinckley, badly burned and hysterical refugees fleeing north up the tracks encountered his train, pleading to be let aboard. The train was unable to go any further into town, as the railroad bridge leading into Hinckley had already been damaged. Root, his fireman John McGowan, conductor Tom Sullivan, and porter John Blair took aboard as many as they could, before Root reversed, intending to make for the waters of Skunk Lake, five miles distant. Sullivan was doubtful; "We will never make it there alive!" Root's response was unmoved, terse: "Then we will die together," he said matter-of-factly.

== Escape by rail ==
By the time the Eastern Minnesota train left Hinckley, much of the dense woodland between it and Sandstone were already aflame, and flames licked at the sides of the wooden cars and engine cabs of the Eastern Minnesota train, melting off paint in many places. Thick smoke made visibility impossible, and with both engines running in reverse there was no headlight to illuminate the tracks. Gambles had to be made crossing countless burning culverts. Many of the refugees jammed aboard the boxcars, coaches, and the caboose had escaped with nothing but the clothes on their backs, and were forced to endure the deadly heat and thick smoke. The train charged through the unbearable conditions of the fire storm with both engines working at full steam for nearly seven miles, with the air clearing only minutes before it arrived in Sandstone at 4:30pm. There, those aboard made a desperate yet unsuccessful attempt to warn the town's residents of the approaching inferno. it was also here that George Powers, the conductor on William Best's train, attempted to hold the train at Sandstone, believing that the fire would blow due north and miss the town altogether. The townspeople of Sandstone echoed this sentiment and believing that the fire would miss them refused to board. However, Barry managed to convince Powers that they should keep moving, and Powers allowed the relief train to continue ahead after waiting 10 minutes.

Just before leaving Sandstone's limits, the Eastern Minnesota train stopped once more when Barry saw that the 150-foot-high trestle over the Kettle River just beyond town was burning. Luckily, the bridge watchmen, M. W. W. Jesmer and W. W. Damuth, had remained on duty. "For God's sake, go on! You can cross it now and it will go down in five minutes", screamed Jesmer to Barry, before ushering the train on. True to Jesmer's word, the train crossed successfully; when it was barely 2,000 feet clear, the east end of the structure collapsed, thus severing the rail line. Jesmer survived the fire, but Damuth did not.

Despite now being ahead of the blaze, the train was still chased by the flames for a considerable distance and made brief stops at several other logging villages up the tracks, such as Partridge, where the depot telegraph operator Mary Boyington and others heard firsthand accounts from survivors, but still, few boarded the train. At 9:00pm that night, Barry and Best's train made it to the safety of Superior and then Duluth, with 500-800 people jammed on board. The two engineers eyes were severely burned, and both were blinded until the next day.

At the same time that the Barry-Best train fled Hinckley, back on the west side of town on the St.P&D tracks, James Root threw his train into reverse. Just as it lurched backwards, an explosion (theorized to be from the Brennan Lumber Company's dry stock of 28 million ft of lumber catching fire all at once) lit the front portion of the train (the engine, tender and baggage car) on fire and shattered the cab windows, cutting Root severely on his head and neck. Root fainted at one point from blood loss, and the train slowed to a crawl with a mere 95 psi in the boiler, but McGowan splashed Root with a bucket of water, and he revived

As the fire burned the surrounding woods and encircled the train, Root threw open the throttle once more, and the Limited made a mad dash, in reverse, to safety. Blair and Sullivan traversed the entire length of the train, which was beginning to catch fire, to calm the hysterical passengers, offer wet towels, and extinguish fires on seats and even the passengers' clothing. Some of the passengers inexplicably jumped through the windows of the coaches back outside, into the flames. After a 10-minute, five-mile dash, Root's train reached Skunk Lake at 4:25pm, 10 minutes ahead of the fire storm. Sullivan, Blair, and McGowan assisted the passengers into Skunk Lake. Blair ran down the entire length of the train mere seconds before the main fire arrived to ensure no one was left aboard. Once it was certain no one was left, Root uncoupled engine No. 69 from its tender and moved it forward slightly when the coal pile caught fire. Root initially intended to ride out the storm in the locomotive, refusing any attempts to get him to leave, but after McGowan found him unconscious from blood loss again, he was brought to the lake and to a doctor. For an hour, the refugees of Root's train huddled in the swamp as the fire storm roared over them, until it subsided. Some mistakenly believed the train only stopped because it could go no further, and continued running north. Between 200-300 people were saved due to the efforts of Root and his train crew.

At 5:15pm, Sandstone was utterly destroyed by the fire storm, effectively "rubbed" off of the sandstone bluff upon which it sat in mere minutes. Over the next 35 minutes, the horrific scenes of Hinckley repeated themselves; people fell burning in the street, townspeople made a mad dash for the Kettle River, or for wells. The heat was so great that the town's titular sandstone cliffs began to flake and spall. The people's only chance of survival had been the Eastern Minnesota train, which had long since gone. Now there were no relief trains to save them, and 45-80 townspeople lost their lives, many simply cremated the second they stepped outside.

== Aftermath ==
The fire burned onwards until just after sunset (6:48pm), when the low-pressure system that had squatted over northern Iowa and Manitoba moved eastward over Ontario and eastern Minnesota, and the rapidly cooling atmosphere began to weigh on the fire, knocking down the convection column and slowly smothering the flaming front. Before it stopped moving completely, it destroyed the community of Finlayson. All 85 residents survived by crowding into a small pond.

Resources from Duluth and Pine City, north and south of the fire-affected area respectively, were slow to arrive, as telegraph lines had been destroyed, so the initial scale of the disaster was unclear. It wasn't until almost 9:30pm that repair crews arrived on the railroads to restore service so relief trains could come in.

The fire had destroyed Hinckley, which at the time had a population of over 1,400) as well as the smaller nearby settlements of Mission Creek, Pokegama, Sandstone, Miller, Partridge, and Finlayson.

According to the Hinckley Fire Museum,

Because of the dryness of the summer, fires were common in the woods, along railroad tracks and in logging camps where loggers would set fire to their slash to clean up the area before moving on. Some loggers, of course left their debris behind, giving any fire more fuel on which to grow. Saturday, September 1st, 1894 began as another oppressively hot day with fires surrounding the towns and two major fires that were burning about five miles (8.0 km) to the south. To add to the problem, the temperature inversion that day added to the heat, smoke and gases being held down by the huge layer of cool air above. The two fires managed to join together to make one large fire with flames that licked through the inversion finding the cool air above. That air came rushing down into the fires to create a vortex or tornado of flames which then began to move quickly and grew larger and larger turning into a fierce firestorm. When it was over the Firestorm had completely destroyed six towns, and over 400 square miles (1,000 km^{2}) lay black and smoldering. The firestorm was so devastating that it lasted only four hours but destroyed everything in its path.

The exact number of fatalities is difficult to determine. The official coroner's report counted 413 dead while the fire's official monument notes 418. An unknown number of Native Americans and backcountry dwellers were also killed in the fire, and due to their social status and attitudes of the day, were intentionally left off of the casualty lists. Bodies continued to be found years later. Many were buried where they were found and remain there to this day. It is second only to the 1918 Cloquet Fire (where 453 were killed) as the deadliest in Minnesota history, and the third deadliest in U.S. history, after the Peshtigo Fire.

== Memorials ==
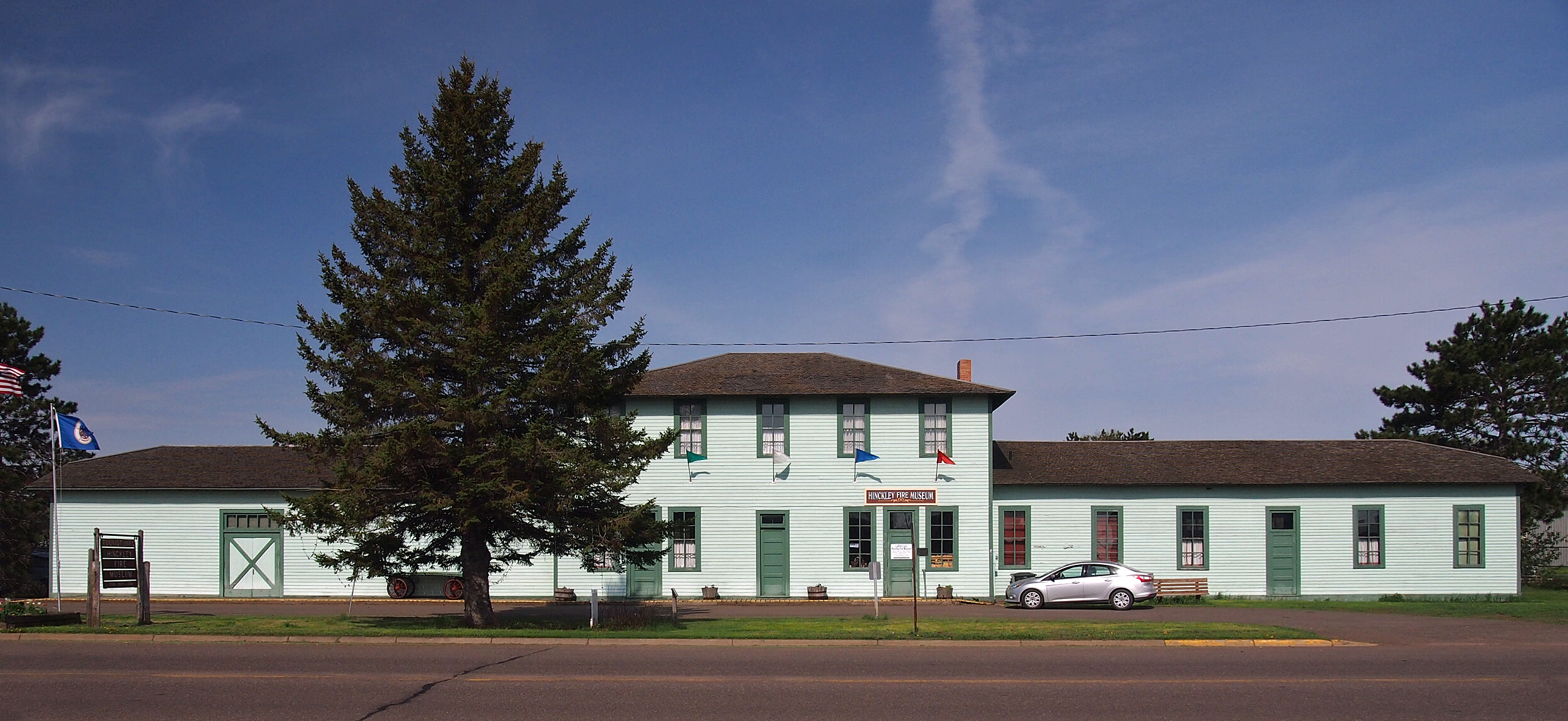
The Hinckley Fire Museum

Today, a 37-mile (60 km) section of the Willard Munger State Trail, from Hinckley to Barnum, is a memorial to the fire and the devastation it caused. In the town of Hinckley, on Highway 61, the Hinckley Fire Museum is located in the former Northern Pacific Railway depot, a carbon copy of the one that burned, located a few feet north of the site of the former one. It is open from May 1 until the end of October.

Lutheran Memorial Cemetery in Hinckley has a historical marker and granite obelisk as a memorial to those who perished in the fire. 248 residents of Hinckley perished in the fire and are buried in a mass grave at this cemetery, the majority unidentified.

The Brook Park Cemetery on County Road 126, south of Minnesota State Highway 23, has an historical marker plaque and a memorial to the 23 fire victims of Brook Park, with a tall obelisk on top of a granite marker, and a mass grave.

== Boston Corbett ==
Popular belief holds that Thomas P. "Boston" Corbett, the Union soldier who killed John Wilkes Booth after Booth's assassination of Abraham Lincoln, was rumored to have died in the fire. His last known residence is believed to have been a forest settlement near Hinckley, and a "Thomas Corbett" is listed as one of the dead or missing. However, in September 2024, a presentation given to the 36th International Congress of Genealogical and Heraldic Sciences, showed that the man who died in the Hinckley fire was Thomas Gilbert Corbitt, originally from Steuben County, New York, and not Boston Corbett. Proofs included the Civil War "invalid" filing by Thomas G. Corbitt, dated September 19, 1890, in Minnesota and on the same document, the widow's filing on August 9, 1895. Another proof included a newspaper article from the September 24, 1894, edition of the Steuben Farmers Advocate, announcing that Thomas Corbitt, formerly of Thurston, Steuben County, New York, had perished in the Hinckley fire.

== See also ==
- Baudette fire of 1910
- Cloquet fire of 1918
- Lahaina Fire of 2023
- Peshtigo fire of 1871
- Thumb Fire of 1881
