= Friesland, Minnesota =

Friesland
- Unincorporated community
- Location within Minnesota Location within the United States
- Coordinates: 46°05′08″N 92°55′47″W
- Country: United States
- State: Minnesota
- County: Pine
- Township: Dell Grove Township
- Elevation: 1,142 ft (348 m)

Population
  - Total: 40
- Time zone: UTC-6 (Central (CST))
  - Summer (DST): UTC-5 (CDT)
- ZIP code: 55037
- Area code: 320
- GNIS feature ID: 643962

Friesland is an unincorporated community in Dell Grove Township, Pine County, Minnesota, United States.

The community is located between Hinckley and Sandstone; near the intersection of Pine County 61, Pine County 26, and the former Northern Pacific Railway (now the Willard Munger State Trail).

== History ==
Located in the southeast corner of Dell Grove Township, Friesland is named after the northern province of the Netherlands. It operated a post office from 1896 to 1917.
