= Wareham =

Wareham may refer to:

== Places ==
- Wareham, Dorset, England
  - Wareham (ward), electoral district
  - Wareham (UK Parliament constituency)
- Wareham, Massachusetts, United States, a town
- Wareham, Minnesota, United States, an abandoned townsite
- Wareham, Newfoundland and Labrador, Canada
- Wareham, Ontario, Canada
- Wareham Island, Nunavut, Canada

== People ==
- Andrew Wareham, British historian
- Arthur Wareham, British newspaper editor
- Dave Wareham, American basketball player
- Dean Wareham, New York-based musician with Galaxie 500, Luna, Dean and Britta
- Jack Wareham, English footballer
- Louise Wareham Leonard, American author
- Nicholas Wareham, British epidemiologist
- Pete Wareham, London-based saxophonist with Acoustic Ladyland, Polar Bear, Melt Yourself Down

== See also ==
- Warham (disambiguation)
