= Groningen, Minnesota =

Groningen
- Unincorporated community
- Location within Minnesota Location within the United States
- Coordinates: 46°09′03″N 92°55′27″W
- Country: United States
- State: Minnesota
- County: Pine
- Township: Dell Grove Township
- Named after: Groningen, Netherlands
- Elevation: 1,129 ft (344 m)

Population
  - Total: 30
- Time zone: UTC-6 (Central (CST))
  - Summer (DST): UTC-5 (CDT)
- ZIP code: 55072
- Area code: 320
- GNIS feature ID: 644490

Groningen is an unincorporated community in Dell Grove Township, Pine County, Minnesota, United States.

The community is located immediately northwest of Sandstone; near the intersection of Pine County 35, Pine County 28 (Groningen Road), and the former Northern Pacific Railway (now the Willard Munger State Trail).

== History ==
Located in the northeast corner of Dell Grove Township, Groningen is named after a northeast province of the Netherlands and that province's eponymous capital city. The community was originally known as Miller Station. When it had a post office, it was known as Belknap from 1877 to 1881, and then Groningen, from 1896 to 1913, and again from 1917 to 1954.
