= Denham, Minnesota =

City in Minnesota, United States

Denham
- City
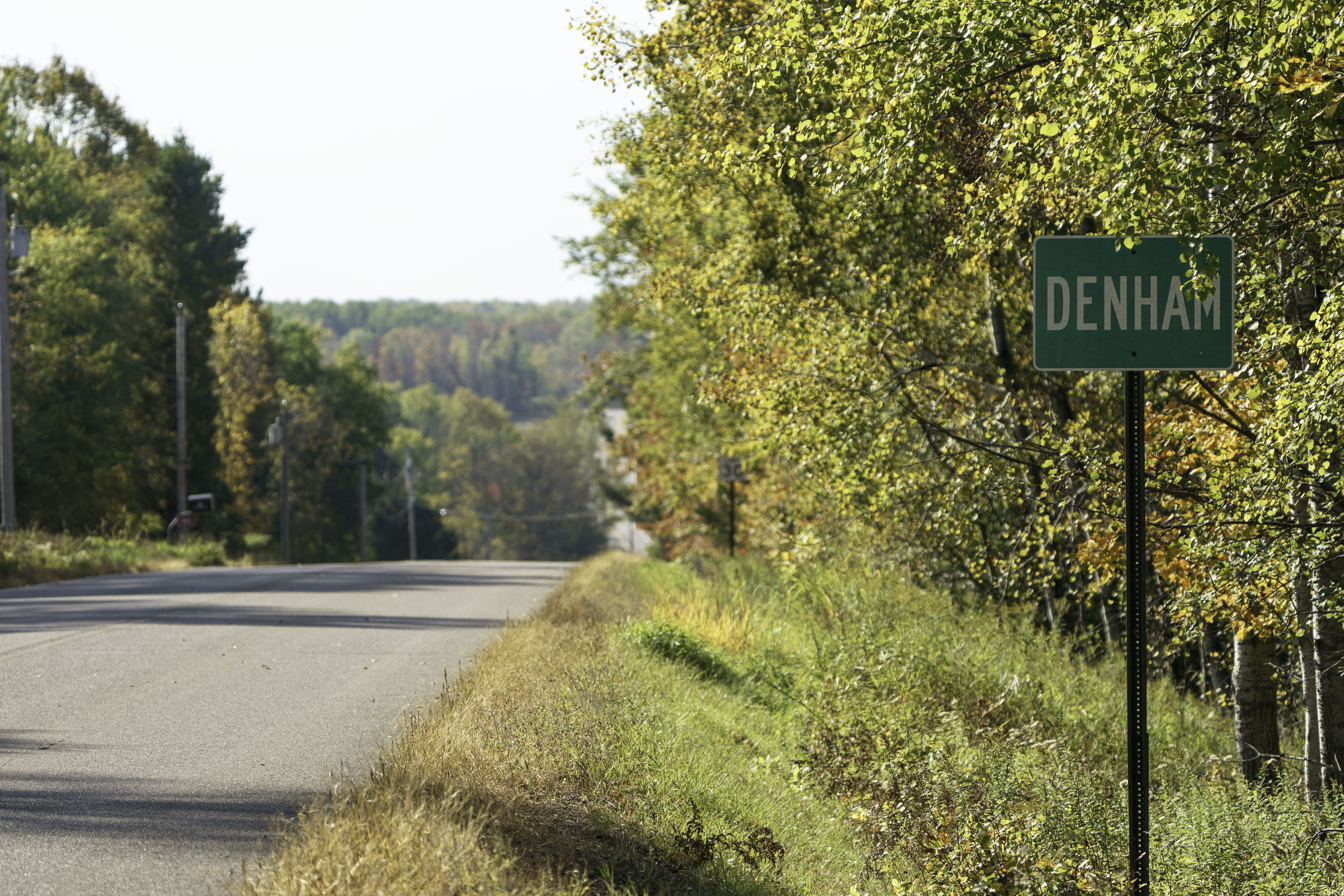
- Sign for Denham

- Location of the city of Denham within Pine County, Minnesota
- Coordinates: 46°21′42″N 92°56′29″W
- Country: United States
- State: Minnesota
- County: Pine
- Incorporated: February 28, 1939

Government
  - Mayor: Pamela Larson

Area
  - Total: 1.32 sq mi (3.43 km^{2})
  - Land: 1.32 sq mi (3.43 km^{2})
  - Water: 0 sq mi (0.00 km^{2})
- Elevation: 1,188 ft (362 m)

Population (2020)
  - Total: 37
  - Density: 27.9/sq mi (10.77/km^{2})
  - Demonym: Denhamite
- Time zone: UTC-6 (Central (CST))
  - Summer (DST): UTC-5 (CDT)
- FIPS code: 27-15670
- GNIS feature ID: 2394513

Denham is a city in Pine County, Minnesota, United States. The population was 37 at the 2020 census.

== History ==
Denham was established in 1908 and incorporated in February 1939. Denham was named for an employee of the Soo Line Railroad. The post office began in 1909, and remained in operation until 1974. Denham had a depot on the Soo Railroad.

== Geography ==
According to the United States Census Bureau, the city has a total area of 1.32 square miles (3.42 km^{2}), all land. Denham is in the northwest part of Pine County. County Roads 40, 46, and 52 are the main routes in the Denham area. Birch Creek is nearby.

Denham is eight miles west of Sturgeon Lake; and nine miles west-northwest of Willow River.

The boundary line between Pine and Carlton counties is nearby. The boundary line between Pine and Aitkin counties is also near Denham.

== Demographics ==
Historical population
Census	Pop.	Note	%±
1940	90		—
1950	96		6.7%
1960	71		−26.0%
1970	56		−21.1%
1980	48		−14.3%
1990	36		−25.0%
2000	40		11.1%
2010	35		−12.5%
2020	37		5.7%
U.S. Decennial Census

=== 2010 census ===
As of the census of 2010, there were 35 people, 15 households, and 10 families living in the city. The population density was 26.5 inhabitants per square mile (10.2/km^{2}). There were 25 housing units at an average density of 18.9 per square mile (7.3/km^{2}). The racial makeup of the city was 91.4% White and 8.6% from two or more races.

There were 15 households, of which 33.3% had children under the age of 18 living with them, 46.7% were married couples living together, 20.0% had a female householder with no husband present, and 33.3% were non-families. 26.7% of all households were made up of individuals, and 6.7% had someone living alone who was 65 years of age or older. The average household size was 2.33 and the average family size was 2.70.

The median age in the city was 48.5 years. 22.9% of residents were under the age of 18; 8.5% were between the ages of 18 and 24; 11.4% were from 25 to 44; 42.8% were from 45 to 64; and 14.3% were 65 years of age or older. The gender makeup of the city was 40.0% male and 60.0% female.

=== 2000 census ===
As of the census of 2000, there were 40 people, 16 households, and 11 families living in the city. The population density was 30.3 inhabitants per square mile (11.7/km^{2}). There were 23 housing units at an average density of 17.4 per square mile (6.7/km^{2}). The racial makeup of the city was 100.00% White.

There were 16 households, out of which 37.5% had children under the age of 18 living with them, 50.0% were married couples living together, 6.3% had a female householder with no husband present, and 31.3% were non-families. 31.3% of all households were made up of individuals, and 18.8% had someone living alone who was 65 years of age or older. The average household size was 2.50 and the average family size was 3.09.

In the city, the population was spread out, with 35.0% under the age of 18, 5.0% from 18 to 24, 22.5% from 25 to 44, 25.0% from 45 to 64, and 12.5% who were 65 years of age or older. The median age was 40 years. For every 100 females, there were 90.5 males. For every 100 females age 18 and over, there were 85.7 males.

The median income for a household in the city was $16,250, and the median income for a family was $40,625. Males had a median income of $0 versus $11,250 for females. The per capita income for the city was $10,106. There were 15.4% of families and 17.6% of the population living below the poverty line, including 10.0% of under eighteens and none of those over 64.
