= Louis Hultgren House and Sand Pit =

Former quarry

- U.S. National Register of Historic Places
- Location within Minnesota
- Location: MN 23, Kerrick, Minnesota
- Coordinates: 46°20′21″N 92°35′25″W
- Area: 7 acres (2.8 ha)
- Built: 1896
- Built by: Hultgren, Louis
- MPS: Pine County MRA
- NRHP reference No.: 80002108
- Added to NRHP: August 18, 1980

The Louis Hultgren House and Sand Pit in Kerrick, Minnesota in Pine County, Minnesota, was listed on the National Register of Historic Places in 1980. It includes a molding sand quarry. In the early 1890s the site was discovered by railroad worker Louis Hultgren, who was born in Sweden in 1863 and immigrated to Pine County in 1888. He purchased the property in 1892 and built a one-and-three-quarters-story white clapboard house in 1896. The sand pit was operated by him and his family for many years.

A detached garage is a second contributing building on the property; the sand pit is a contributing site.
