= Park Township, Pine County, Minnesota =

Park Township, Minnesota
- Township
- Location within the state of Minnesota Park Township, Minnesota (the United States)
- Coordinates: 46°16′49″N 92°31′15″W
- Country: United States
- State: Minnesota
- County: Pine

Area
  - Total: 36.8 sq mi (95.2 km^{2})
  - Land: 36.6 sq mi (94.9 km^{2})
  - Water: 0.15 sq mi (0.4 km^{2})
- Elevation: 1,250 ft (381 m)

Population (2000)
  - Total: 37
  - Density: 1.0/sq mi (0.4/km^{2})
- Time zone: UTC-6 (Central (CST))
  - Summer (DST): UTC-5 (CDT)
- FIPS code: 27-49660
- GNIS feature ID: 0665253

Park Township is a township in Pine County, Minnesota, United States. The population was 37 at the 2000 census.

== Geography ==
According to the United States Census Bureau, the township has a total area of 36.8 square miles (95.2 km^{2}), of which 36.6 square miles (94.9 km^{2}) is land and 0.1 square mile (0.4 km^{2}) (0.38%) is water.

== Demographics ==
As of the census of 2000, there were 37 people, 18 households, and 10 families residing in the township. The population density was 1.0 people per square mile (0.4/km^{2}). There were 67 housing units at an average density of 1.8/sq mi (0.7/km^{2}). The racial makeup of the township was 89.19% White, 2.70% African American, and 8.11% from two or more races. Hispanic or Latino of any race were 2.70% of the population.

There were 18 households, out of which 5.6% had children under the age of 18 living with them, 38.9% were married couples living together, 16.7% had a female householder with no husband present, and 44.4% were non-families. 44.4% of all households were made up of individuals, and 16.7% had someone living alone who was 65 years of age or older. The average household size was 2.06 and the average family size was 2.90.

In the township the population was spread out, with 13.5% under the age of 18, 5.4% from 18 to 24, 27.0% from 25 to 44, 27.0% from 45 to 64, and 27.0% who were 65 years of age or older. The median age was 49 years. For every 100 females, there were 105.6 males. For every 100 females age 18 and over, there were 100.0 males.

The median income for a household in the township was $42,000, and the median income for a family was $58,125. Males had a median income of $36,250 versus $24,792 for females. The per capita income for the township was $17,398. None of the population or the families were below the poverty line.
