= Warham =

Warham may refer to:

Places

- Warham, Herefordshire, England
- Warham, Norfolk, England

People

- Joe Warham - English rugby league footballer, coach and administrator
- John Warham - New Zealand ornithologist
- William Warham (1450-1532) - Archbishop of Canterbury
- William Warham (Archdeacon of Canterbury) (c. 1480 – 1557), nephew of the Archbishop of Canterbury

Companies

- Thornewill and Warham - an English engineering company (1849-1929)

== See also ==
- Wareham (disambiguation)
