= Wareham, Minnesota =

Ghost town in Pine County, Minnesota, US

Wareham
- Ghost town
- Location within Minnesota
- Coordinates: 46°06′05″N 92°52′10″W
- Country: United States
- State: Minnesota
- County: Pine
- Time zone: UTC-6 (Central (CST))
  - Summer (DST): UTC-5 (CDT)
- Area code: 320
- GNIS feature ID: 651181

Wareham is an abandoned townsite in Pine County, Minnesota, United States.

Wareham was located immediately south of Sandstone on Government Road. Government Road, also known as "Douglas Highway" or the "Old Military Road", had served as a main route in the community. It is two miles from Interstate 35.

== History ==
The community of Wareham originally had access to the Great Northern Railway line; with the former rail right-of-way still being used by electrical transmission lines.

The Kettle River and a stage-coach road built by the military were also in the vicinity. After old Highway 61 was improved by the 1940s, running through nearby Friesland, Wareham then became a ghost town.

In the present day, a camp is located where the community had once existed; with access to the river.
