= Minnesota State Highway 48 =

State highway in Minnesota, United States

Trunk Highway 48
- MN 48 highlighted in red

Route information
- Maintained by MnDOT
- Length: 23.527 mi (37.863 km)
- Existed: 1933–present

Major junctions
- West end: I-35 at Hinckley
- East end: WIS 77 near Danbury, Wisconsin

Location
- Country: United States
- State: Minnesota
- Counties: Pine

Highway system
- Minnesota Trunk Highway System; Interstate; US; State; Legislative; Scenic
← MN 47	→ MN 50

Minnesota State Highway 48 (MN 48) is a 23.527-mile-long (37.863 km) highway in east-central Minnesota, which runs from its interchange with Interstate Highway 35 in Hinckley and continues east to its eastern terminus at the Wisconsin state line (near Danbury), where it becomes Wisconsin Highway 77.

Highway 48 passes through the communities of Hinckley, Barry Township, Arlone Township, Cloverdale, and Clover Township.

== Route description ==
State Highway 48 serves as an east–west route between Hinckley, Cloverdale, and Danbury, WI.

Highway 48 crosses the Grindstone River on the eastern edge of Hinckley. The route crosses the Kettle River in Barry Township near Hinckley. The eastern terminus of Highway 48 is at the St. Croix River, where the route becomes Wisconsin Highway 77 upon crossing the river.

St. Croix State Park is located 15 miles east of Hinckley on Highway 48, then 5 miles south on County Road 22. The St. Croix State Forest is located east of Cloverdale near the route.

Camp Nathanael is located 16 miles (26 km) east of Hinckley on Highway 48.

Highway 48 is also known as Fire Monument Road in the city of Hinckley.

The route provides major access to Grand Casino Hinckley.

The route is legally defined as Legislative Route 195 in the Minnesota Statutes. It is not marked with this number.

Most of the highway is posted at 60 mph. Lower speed limits are in place from Interstate 35 to just east of Grand Casino near Hinckley Road, and through Cloverdale, where a short 45 mph segment exists. The maximum speed limit was raised from 55 mph to 60 after a study was completed in 2016.

== History ==
State Highway 48 was authorized in 1933.

The route was paved by 1953.

== Major intersections ==
The entire route is in Pine County.

Location	mi	km	Destinations	Notes
Hinckley	0.000	0.000	I-35 – Duluth, St. Paul, Minneapolis	Interchange
St. Croix River	23.524	37.858	Minnesota–Wisconsin state line	
St. Croix River	23.524	37.858	WIS 77 east – Danbury	Continuation into Wisconsin
1.000 mi = 1.609 km; 1.000 km = 0.621 mi
