= Belden, Minnesota =

Coordinates: 46°19′20″N 92°18′48″W

Belden is a ghost town in Pine County, in the U.S. state of Minnesota.

== History ==
A post office called Belden was established in 1913, and remained in operation until 1943. Belden had a depot on the Soo Railway.
