= Harlis, Minnesota =

Ghost town in Minnesota, United States

Coordinates: 46°24′44″N 92°18′46″W

Harlis is a ghost town in Pine County, in the U.S. state of Minnesota.

== History ==
A post office called Harlis was established in 1914, and remained in operation until 1932. Harlis had a depot on the Soo Line Railroad.
