= Kettle River Bridge =

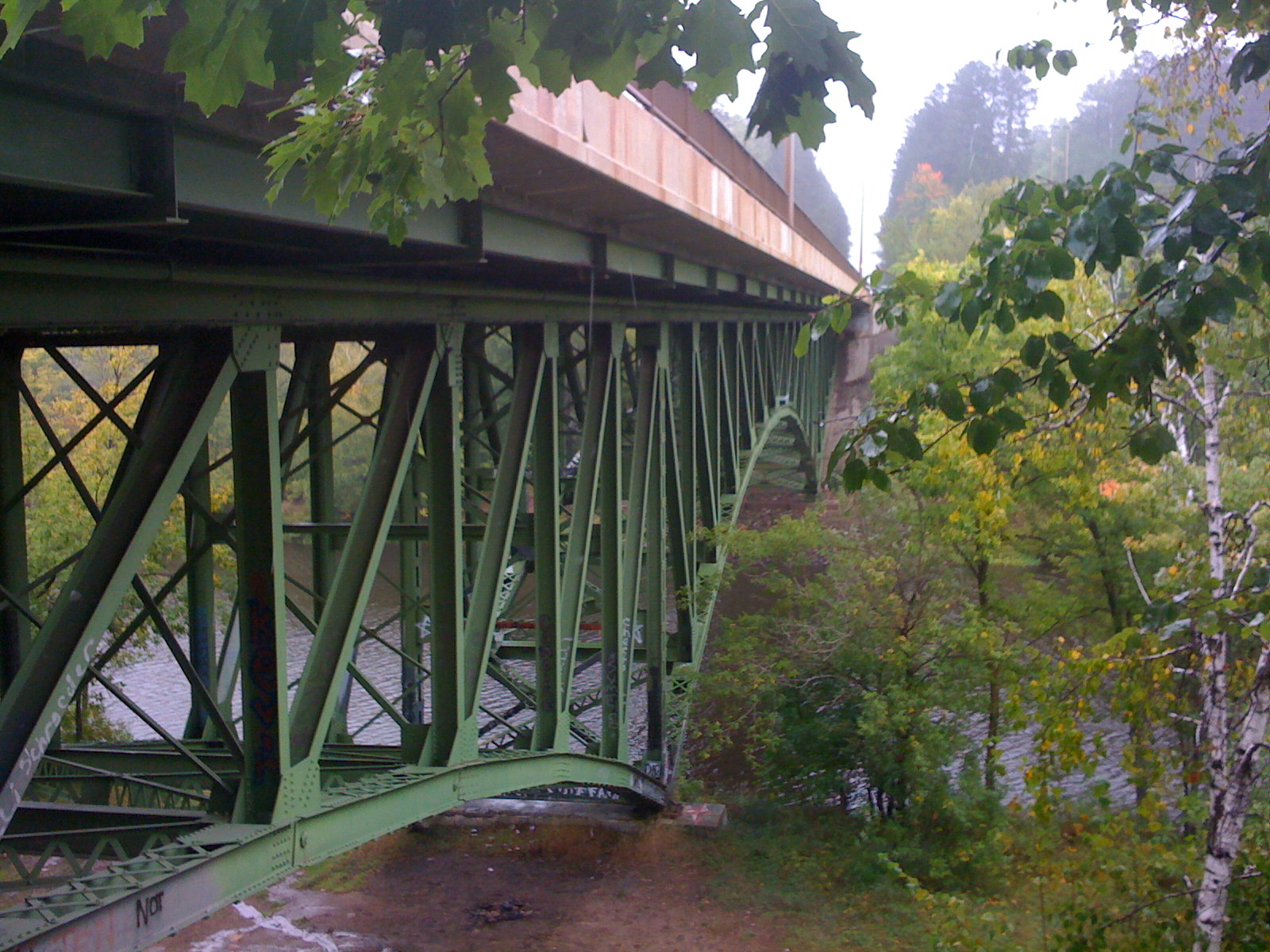
- Coordinates: 46°07′44″N 92°51′23″W
- Carries: State Highway 123
- Crosses: Kettle River (St. Croix River)
- Locale: Sandstone, Minnesota
- Owner: Minnesota Department of Transportation
- Heritage status: National Register of Historic Places
- ID number: 5718

Characteristics
- Design: Cantilevered Pratt deck truss bridge
- Material: Steel
- Total length: 400 feet (120 m)

History
- Architect: Minnesota Department of Highways
- Constructed by: A. Guthrie & Company
- Construction start: 1942
- Construction end: 1948
- Construction cost: $225,000
- Opened: 1948
- Kettle River Bridge
- U.S. National Register of Historic Places
- Location within Minnesota
- Location: MN 123 over Kettle R., Sandstone, Minnesota
- Coordinates: 46°07′44″N 92°51′23″W
- Area: less than one acre
- Built: 1948
- Built by: Guthrie, A. & Co.
- Architect: Minnesota Highway Dept.
- Architectural style: Deck Pratt truss
- MPS: Iron and Steel Bridges in Minnesota MPS
- NRHP reference No.: 98000687
- Added to NRHP: June 29, 1998

Location
- Interactive map of Kettle River Bridge

The Kettle River Bridge is a Pratt truss bridge that carries State Highway 123 over the Kettle River in Sandstone, Minnesota. It is adjacent to the former Kettle River Sandstone Company Quarry, which is listed on the National Register of Historic Places, and about a mile upstream of Federal Correctional Institution, Sandstone. The bridge was listed on the National Register of Historic Places in 1998.

The bridge replaced another deck truss bridge built in the same location, which was adequate for wagon traffic but not really suitable for vehicles. State Highway 123 was designated a state highway in 1933, and the citizens of Sandstone put in a request for a sturdier bridge. The state of Minnesota did not have enough money for the bridge project, because of the Great Depression, but federal money became available after the Sandstone prison opened in 1939. Plans were drawn up in 1941, and work started the following year. Steel was needed for the World War II effort, though, so construction was paused until 1947, when steel was more readily available.

While construction was paused, engineers noticed that the fill for the approaches was settling. The design was changed from a continuous truss to a cantilevered truss by adding pinned hinges into the end spans. The National Register nomination describes the result: "The net result of these details is that the bridge, while having the elegant arch-like appearance of a continuous curved-chord truss, is in fact composed of three distinct units. The main center span is supported on the river piers and cantilevers toward the abutments; while the two suspended end spans are free to rotate downward about the pin at the cantilever end, in response to abutment settlements."
