= Grindstone River =

Coordinates: 46.0274511°N 92.8632572°W

Location
- Country: United States

Physical characteristics
- Source
  - location: Minnesota

The Grindstone River is a 6.7-mile-long (10.8 km) river of Minnesota, a tributary of the Kettle River. Its name is derived either from the Dakota Iŋswú watpá (Small Stones River) or from the Ojibwe Zhiigwanaabikokaa-ziibi (River abundant with grind stones). Sandstone taken from near the river was used to produce sharpening stones. In Ojibwe, Hinckley (Gaa-zhiigwanaabikokaag) is named after this river.

The South Fork Grindstone River rises in a wetland complex in Kroschel Township, Kanabec County, and flows south and east. The North Fork Grindstone River rises from Grindstone Lake in Dell Grove Township, Pine County, and flows south. The two forks join in Hinckley, and the main river flows generally east and empties into the Kettle River in Barry Township, Pine County. Grindstone Lake, the North Fork Grindstone River and the lower course of the Grindstone River are shown on the 1757 edition of the Mitchell Map.

== See also ==
- List of rivers of Minnesota
