= Rutledge, Minnesota =

City in Minnesota, United States

Rutledge
- City
- Motto: "The Lonely Pine"
- Location of the city of Rutledge within Pine County, Minnesota
- Coordinates: 46°15′25″N 92°52′11″W
- Country: United States
- State: Minnesota
- County: Pine
- Incorporated: February 17, 1893

Government
  - Mayor: Richard Holm

Area
  - Total: 3.02 sq mi (7.81 km^{2})
  - Land: 2.95 sq mi (7.63 km^{2})
  - Water: 0.069 sq mi (0.18 km^{2})
- Elevation: 1,030 ft (310 m)

Population (2020)
  - Total: 212
  - Density: 71.9/sq mi (27.78/km^{2})
  - Demonym: Rutledgevian
- Time zone: UTC-6 (Central (CST))
  - Summer (DST): UTC-5 (CDT)
- ZIP code: 55795 (North of Pine River); 55735 (South of Pine River)
- Area codes: 218 (North of Pine River); 320 (South of Pine River)
- FIPS code: 27-56518
- GNIS feature ID: 2396462
- Website: https://www.cityofrutledge.org/

Rutledge is a city in Pine County, Minnesota, United States, at the confluence of the Kettle and Pine Rivers. As of the 2020 census, Rutledge had a population of 212.

Pine County 61 serves as a main route in the community. The Willard Munger Bicycle / Snowmobile Trail also passes through Rutledge.

== History ==
Long before it ever became an incorporated village, a group of Indigenous Americans lived along the banks of the Kettle River from where the community is today to a point about five miles downstream. The Government Road, a.k.a. Military Road, between St. Paul, Minnesota and Superior, Wisconsin passed through that area in the 1860s. A bridge was constructed across the Kettle River at what was called the Rock Dam. On the south side of the river, a station was built, at which stagecoaches stopped to change horses and allow passengers to get out and stretch their legs and have a lunch. It was at this location where the first Europeans settled. In 1870, the Lake Superior and Mississippi Railroad was completed in this region. A depot was built about two and one half miles upstream from the Rock Dam, named Kettle River Station. The community began to grow near the railroad station. On February 14, 1893, an election was held at the school house to decide whether the settlement should be incorporated as a village. A total of 22 votes were cast, 19 favoring incorporation. The Village of Rutledge was named after local lumberman Edward Rutledge, who had built several mills in the area. James D. McCormack served as the first Mayor of Rutledge.

== Geography ==
According to the United States Census Bureau, the city has a total area of 3.03 square miles (7.85 km^{2}), of which 2.96 square miles (7.67 km^{2}) is land and 0.07 square miles (0.18 km^{2}) is water.

== Demographics ==
Historical population
Census	Pop.	Note	%±
1900	363		—
1910	89		−75.5%
1920	90		1.1%
1930	95		5.6%
1940	161		69.5%
1950	163		1.2%
1960	146		−10.4%
1970	123		−15.8%
1980	185		50.4%
1990	152		−17.8%
2000	196		28.9%
2010	229		16.8%
2020	212		−7.4%
U.S. Decennial Census

=== 2010 census ===
As of the census of 2010, there were 229 people, 94 households, and 65 families living in the city. The population density was 77.4 inhabitants per square mile (29.9/km^{2}). There were 130 housing units at an average density of 43.9 per square mile (16.9/km^{2}). The racial makeup of the city was 96.9% White, 1.3% African American, 0.9% Native American, and 0.9% from two or more races. Hispanic or Latino of any race were 0.4% of the population.

There were 94 households, of which 30.9% had children under the age of 18 living with them, 54.3% were married couples living together, 9.6% had a female householder with no husband present, 5.3% had a male householder with no wife present, and 30.9% were non-families. 24.5% of all households were made up of individuals, and 7.4% had someone living alone who was 65 years of age or older. The average household size was 2.44 and the average family size was 2.89.

The median age in the city was 42.1 years. 21.8% of residents were under the age of 18; 6.2% were between the ages of 18 and 24; 28.4% were from 25 to 44; 31.5% were from 45 to 64; and 12.2% were 65 years of age or older. The gender makeup of the city was 51.1% male and 48.9% female.

=== 2000 census ===
As of the census of 2000, there were 196 people, 78 households, and 56 families living in the city. The population density was 66.5 inhabitants per square mile (25.7/km^{2}). There were 110 housing units at an average density of 37.3 per square mile (14.4/km^{2}). The racial makeup of the city was 96.94% White, 1.53% Native American, 1.53% from other races. Hispanic or Latino of any race were 1.53% of the population.

There were 78 households, out of which 30.8% had children under the age of 18 living with them, 60.3% were married couples living together, 9.0% had a female householder with no husband present, and 28.2% were non-families. 20.5% of all households were made up of individuals, and 10.3% had someone living alone who was 65 years of age or older. The average household size was 2.51 and the average family size was 2.95.

In the city, the population was spread out, with 24.5% under the age of 18, 6.6% from 18 to 24, 32.7% from 25 to 44, 26.0% from 45 to 64, and 10.2% who were 65 years of age or older. The median age was 35 years. For every 100 females, there were 100.0 males. For every 100 females age 18 and over, there were 100.0 males.

The median income for a household in the city was $33,750, and the median income for a family was $47,083. Males had a median income of $25,250 versus $21,667 for females. The per capita income for the city was $19,040. About 15.3% of families and 19.6% of the population were below the poverty line, including 37.5% of those under the age of eighteen and none of those 65 or over.
