= Hinckley station (Minnesota) =

- Northern Pacific Depot
- U.S. National Register of Historic Places
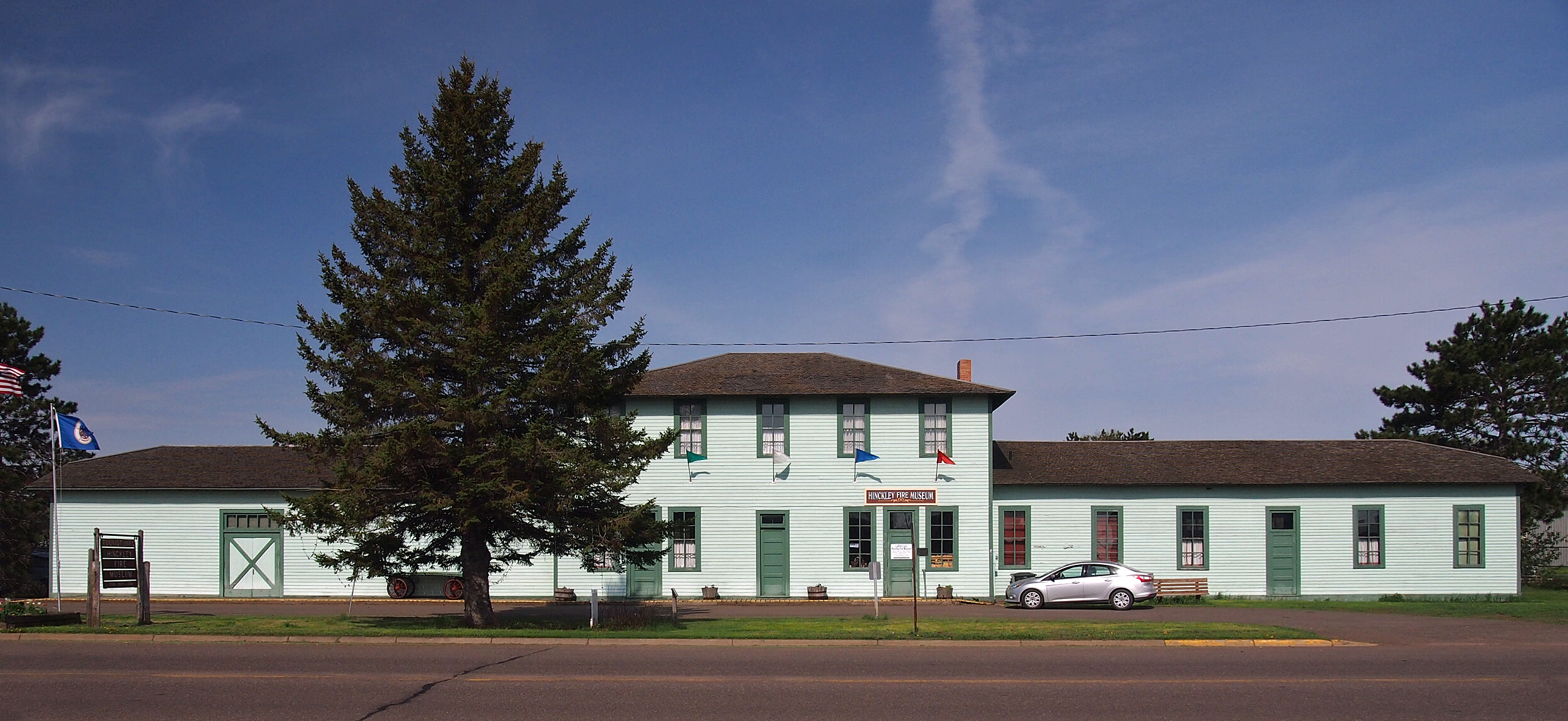
- The Northern Pacific Depot from the east

- Location within Minnesota Location within the United States
- Location: Hinckley, Minnesota
- Coordinates: 46°0′56″N 92°56′35″W
- Built: 1895
- NRHP reference No.: 73000992
- Added to NRHP: May 7, 1973

The Northern Pacific Depot in Hinckley, Minnesota, United States, is a wood-framed depot built in 1895, the year after the previous depot was destroyed in the Great Hinckley Fire on September 1, 1894. The depot was built from the plans of the previous depot. It was listed on the National Register of Historic Places in 1973. The building was originally built by the St. Paul and Duluth Railroad, which was acquired by the Northern Pacific Railway in 1900. The building had separate men's and women's waiting rooms, a freight room, a restaurant known as the "Beanery", and a stationmaster's living quarters on the second floor.

Passenger train service to Hinckley station ended on January 4, 1967, when trains 65 and 66 were discontinued between the Twin Cities and Duluth.

The depot is now known as the Hinckley Fire Museum. The museum interprets the history of the fire that destroyed six towns and burned over 400 square miles (1,000 km^{2}). It also explains how the town was rebuilt and how the area shifted to agricultural use after the lumbering era ended.

Preceding station	Northern Pacific Railway	Following station
Friesland toward Minneapolis	Minneapolis – Duluth	Beroun toward Duluth
