= Ogema Township, Pine County, Minnesota =

Ogema Township, Minnesota
- Township
- Location within the state of Minnesota Ogema Township, Minnesota (the United States)
- Coordinates: 46°2′32″N 92°27′58″W
- Country: United States
- State: Minnesota
- County: Pine

Area
  - Total: 48.0 sq mi (124.4 km^{2})
  - Land: 46.8 sq mi (121.3 km^{2})
  - Water: 1.2 sq mi (3.2 km^{2})
- Elevation: 997 ft (304 m)

Population (2000)
  - Total: 298
  - Density: 6.5/sq mi (2.5/km^{2})
- Time zone: UTC-6 (Central (CST))
  - Summer (DST): UTC-5 (CDT)
- FIPS code: 27-48148
- GNIS feature ID: 0665202
- Website: https://www.ogematownshipmn.gov/

Ogema Township is a township in Pine County, Minnesota, United States. The population was 298 at the 2000 census.

Ogema is a name derived from the Ojibwe language ogimaa meaning "chief".

== Geography ==
According to the United States Census Bureau, the township has a total area of 48.0 square miles (124.4 km^{2}), of which 46.8 square miles (121.3 km^{2}) is land and 1.2 square miles (3.2 km^{2}) (2.54%) is water.

== Demographics ==
As of the census of 2000, there were 298 people, 103 households, and 77 families residing in the township. The population density was 6.4 people per square mile (2.5/km^{2}). There were 207 housing units at an average density of 4.4/sq mi (1.7/km^{2}). The racial makeup of the township was 45.64% White, 3.02% African American, 48.99% Native American, 0.34% Asian, and 2.01% from two or more races. Hispanic or Latino of any race were 0.34% of the population.

There were 103 households, out of which 35.9% had children under the age of 18 living with them, 46.6% were married couples living together, 21.4% had a female householder with no husband present, and 25.2% were non-families. 20.4% of all households were made up of individuals, and 4.9% had someone living alone who was 65 years of age or older. The average household size was 2.87 and the average family size was 3.26.

In the township the population was spread out, with 31.5% under the age of 18, 9.4% from 18 to 24, 24.2% from 25 to 44, 25.8% from 45 to 64, and 9.1% who were 65 years of age or older. The median age was 35 years. For every 100 females, there were 108.4 males. For every 100 females age 18 and over, there were 92.5 males.

The median income for a household in the township was $28,750, and the median income for a family was $33,500. Males had a median income of $23,750 versus $30,333 for females. The per capita income for the township was $13,042. About 25.0% of families and 34.0% of the population were below the poverty line, including 62.7% of those under the age of eighteen and 5.6% of those 65 or over.
