= Danforth Township, Pine County, Minnesota =

Danforth Township, Minnesota
- Township
- District No. 74 School in Danforth Township

- Location within the state of Minnesota Danforth Township, Minnesota (the United States)
- Coordinates: 46°7′10″N 92°37′22″W
- Country: United States
- State: Minnesota
- County: Pine

Area
  - Total: 36.3 sq mi (94.0 km^{2})
  - Land: 36.3 sq mi (94.0 km^{2})
  - Water: 0.039 sq mi (0.1 km^{2})
- Elevation: 1,086 ft (331 m)

Population (2000)
  - Total: 84
  - Density: 2.3/sq mi (0.9/km^{2})
- Time zone: UTC-6 (Central (CST))
  - Summer (DST): UTC-5 (CDT)
- ZIP code: 55072
- Area code: 320
- FIPS code: 27-14680
- GNIS feature ID: 0663920

Danforth Township is a township in Pine County, Minnesota, United States. The population was 84 at the 2000 census.

Danforth Township bears the name of N. H. Danforth, a local landowner.

== Geography ==
According to the United States Census Bureau, the township has a total area of 36.3 square miles (94 km^{2}), of which 36.3 square miles (94 km^{2}) is land and 0.04 square miles (0.10 km^{2}) (0.08%) is water.

== Demographics ==
As of the census of 2000, there were 84 people, 33 households, and 25 families residing in the township. The population density was 2.3 people per square mile (0.9/km^{2}). There were 81 housing units at an average density of 2.2/sq mi (0.9/km^{2}). The racial makeup of the township was 100.00% White.

There were 33 households, out of which 33.3% had children under the age of 18 living with them, 60.6% were married couples living together, 9.1% had a female householder with no husband present, and 24.2% were non-families. 18.2% of all households were made up of individuals, and 3.0% had someone living alone who was 65 years of age or older. The average household size was 2.55 and the average family size was 2.96.

In the township the population was spread out, with 29.8% under the age of 18, 4.8% from 18 to 24, 23.8% from 25 to 44, 28.6% from 45 to 64, and 13.1% who were 65 years of age or older. The median age was 41 years. For every 100 females, there were 110.0 males. For every 100 females age 18 and over, there were 103.4 males.

The median income for a household in the township was $49,375, and the median income for a family was $46,250. Males had a median income of $46,250 versus $48,750 for females. The per capita income for the township was $22,171. There were 33.3% of families and 40.3% of the population living below the poverty line, including 100.0% of under eighteens and none of those over 64.
