= Willard Munger State Trail =

System of recreational trails in Minnesota, USA

Coordinates: 46°27′05″N 92°46′05″W

The Willard Munger State Trail is a system of recreational trails between Hinckley and Duluth, Minnesota. The trail's three segments are the Hinckley to Duluth Segment, Alex Laveau Memorial Trail, and Matthew Lourey State Trail.

== Hinckley to Duluth Segment ==
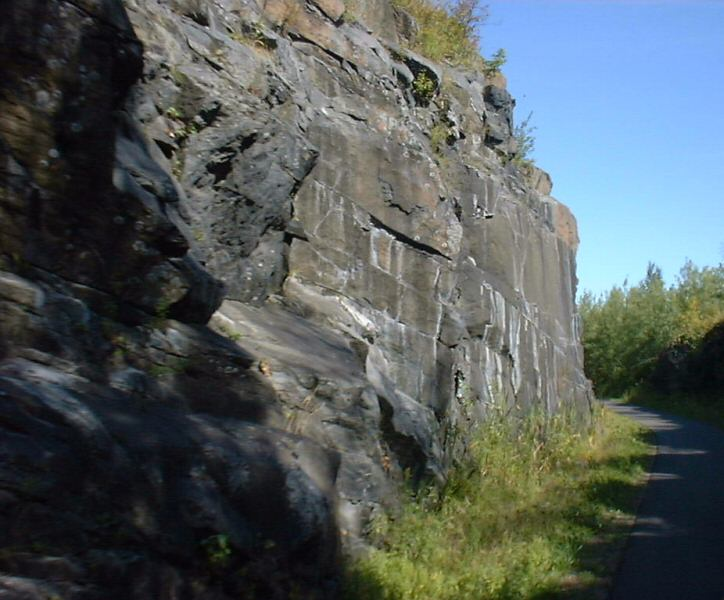
A view of the Munger Trail as it passes through a rock cut between Carlton, Minnesota and Duluth, Minnesota.

The most well-known trail is a paved trail that starts in Hinckley and goes northeast to Duluth. With a length of 63 miles (101 km), it is the fifth-longest paved trail in the U.S. It passes through Willow River, Moose Lake, Barnum, and Carlton before terminating in Duluth. Along the way, it goes through Jay Cooke State Park and close to Banning State Park. The 15-mile (24 km) segment between Carlton and Duluth is particularly scenic, as it passes through forested areas and rock cuts before opening up to scenic views of the Lake Superior harbor and downtown Duluth.

The trail was originally part of the St. Paul and Duluth Railroad, originally built as the Lake Superior and Mississippi Railroad and later part of the Northern Pacific Railway.

The trail is named after Willard Munger, a Minnesota state legislator who devoted his legislative career to trail development and environmental protection from 1954 until his death in 1999. The Munger family owns the Willard Munger Inn near the end of the trail in Duluth.

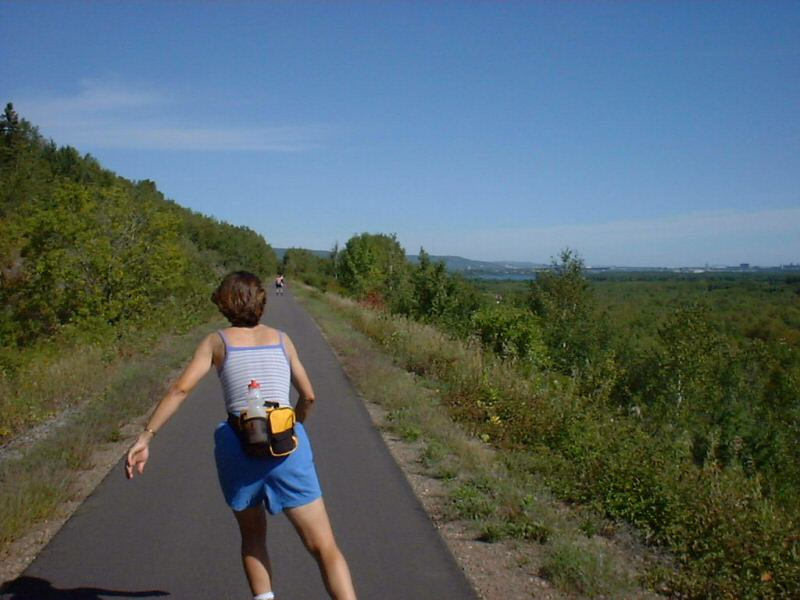
Another view of the Munger Trail as it approaches Duluth, Minnesota. St. Louis Bay is visible in the distance. This section of the trail has a very scenic view.

== Alex Laveau Memorial Trail ==
This segment of the trail connects Carlton and Wrenshall, running just south of Jay Cooke State Park, and terminates at Minnesota State Highway 23. From there, bicyclists can ride paved shoulders into the Gary-New Duluth neighborhoods of Duluth. Alex Laveau was a former county commissioner who advocated reusing abandoned railways as recreational trails.

== Matthew Lourey State Trail ==
The Matthew Lourey State Trail runs along Minnesota's eastern boundary. It starts in Chengwatana State Forest, runs northeasterly along the St. Croix River through the St. Croix State Park and into the St. Croix State Forest, and then in a northerly direction through the Nemadji State Forest before terminating near Holyoke. This segment of the trail is unpaved, and is intended for snowmobile, motorcycle, ATV, horseback riding, and mountain biking.
