= Hinckley, Minnesota =

City in Minnesota, United States

Hinckley Gaa-zhiigwanaabikokaag (Ojibwe)
- City
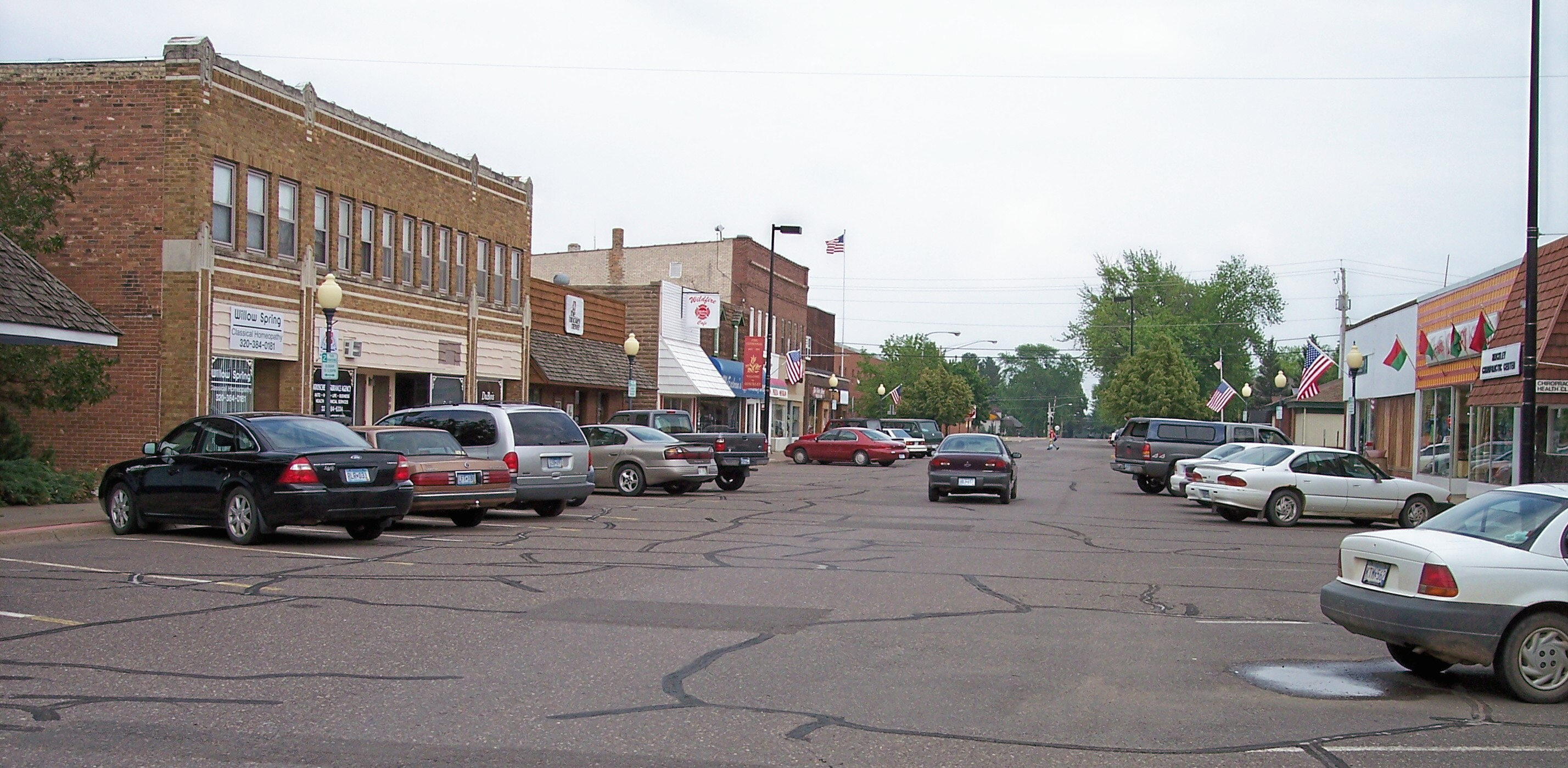
- Main Street in downtown Hinckley in 2007

- Logo

- Location of the city of Hinckley within Pine County, Minnesota
- Coordinates: 46°0′44″N 92°56′32″W
- Country: United States
- State: Minnesota
- County: Pine
- Incorporated (village): 1885
- Incorporated (city): November 27, 1907

Government
  - Mayor: Donald Zeman

Area
  - Total: 3.83 sq mi (9.93 km^{2})
  - Land: 3.79 sq mi (9.81 km^{2})
  - Water: 0.050 sq mi (0.13 km^{2})
- Elevation: 1,014 ft (309 m)

Population (2020)
  - Total: 1,904
  - Density: 502.9/sq mi (194.18/km^{2})
  - Demonym: Hincklian
- Time zone: UTC-6 (Central (CST))
  - Summer (DST): UTC-5 (CDT)
- ZIP code: 55037
- Area code: 320
- FIPS code: 27-29294
- GNIS feature ID: 2394390
- Website: https://hinckleymn.gov/

Hinckley is a city in Pine County, Minnesota, United States, located at the junction of Interstate 35 and Minnesota State Highway 48. The population was 1,904 at the 2020 census.

Hinckley's name in the Ojibwe language is Gaa-zhiigwanaabikokaag, meaning "the place abundant with grindstones" due to being located along the Grindstone River. Portions of the Mille Lacs Indian Reservation are located within and adjacent to Hinckley.

On September 1, 1894, the Great Hinckley Fire killed more than 400 people.

Hinckley is generally considered the halfway point on Interstate 35 between Minneapolis–Saint Paul and Duluth.

== Geography ==
According to the United States Census Bureau, the city has a total area of 3.83 square miles (9.92 km^{2}), of which 3.78 square miles (9.79 km^{2}) is land and 0.05 square miles (0.13 km^{2}) is water.

Interstate Highway 35 and Minnesota Highway 23 (co-signed); and Minnesota Highway 48 are two of the main routes in Hinckley. Interstate 35 runs north–south; and Highway 48 (Fire Monument Road) runs east–west. Pine County 61 passes through downtown Hinckley.

Hinckley is along the Grindstone River. The Kettle River is also nearby.

Hinckley is the home of Grand Casino Hinckley, sister casino to Grand Casino Mille Lacs; which holds an associate count equal to the population of the city of Hinckley itself.

Camp Nathanael, a Christian boy's camp, is located 16 miles (26 km) east of Hinckley on Highway 48.

=== Climate ===
Climate data for Hinckley, Minnesota, 1991–2020 normals, extremes 1905–2011
Month	Jan	Feb	Mar	Apr	May	Jun	Jul	Aug	Sep	Oct	Nov	Dec	Year
Record high °F (°C)	53 (12)	58 (14)	79 (26)	94 (34)	93 (34)	101 (38)	102 (39)	102 (39)	96 (36)	88 (31)	73 (23)	59 (15)	102 (39)
Mean maximum °F (°C)	39.8 (4.3)	45.4 (7.4)	59.6 (15.3)	76.7 (24.8)	84.0 (28.9)	88.6 (31.4)	90.9 (32.7)	90.3 (32.4)	83.9 (28.8)	75.0 (23.9)	57.8 (14.3)	42.1 (5.6)	93.2 (34.0)
Mean daily maximum °F (°C)	19.4 (−7.0)	25.3 (−3.7)	37.5 (3.1)	52.2 (11.2)	65.4 (18.6)	74.6 (23.7)	79.4 (26.3)	77.3 (25.2)	69.4 (20.8)	54.6 (12.6)	38.7 (3.7)	25.6 (−3.6)	51.6 (10.9)
Daily mean °F (°C)	9.3 (−12.6)	14.3 (−9.8)	26.6 (−3.0)	40.3 (4.6)	52.6 (11.4)	62.4 (16.9)	67.2 (19.6)	64.8 (18.2)	56.7 (13.7)	43.4 (6.3)	29.8 (−1.2)	17.1 (−8.3)	40.4 (4.6)
Mean daily minimum °F (°C)	−0.9 (−18.3)	3.3 (−15.9)	15.7 (−9.1)	28.4 (−2.0)	39.9 (4.4)	50.3 (10.2)	54.9 (12.7)	52.4 (11.3)	44.0 (6.7)	32.1 (0.1)	20.9 (−6.2)	8.5 (−13.1)	29.1 (−1.6)
Mean minimum °F (°C)	−23.6 (−30.9)	−17.9 (−27.7)	−5.7 (−20.9)	15.6 (−9.1)	27.9 (−2.3)	37.5 (3.1)	44.1 (6.7)	42.5 (5.8)	29.1 (−1.6)	18.7 (−7.4)	2.9 (−16.2)	−17.8 (−27.7)	−27.0 (−32.8)
Record low °F (°C)	−41 (−41)	−39 (−39)	−38 (−39)	−2 (−19)	15 (−9)	29 (−2)	37 (3)	30 (−1)	20 (−7)	−30 (−34)	−22 (−30)	−40 (−40)	−41 (−41)
Average precipitation inches (mm)	0.95 (24)	0.90 (23)	1.64 (42)	2.77 (70)	3.81 (97)	4.64 (118)	4.07 (103)	4.26 (108)	3.61 (92)	3.45 (88)	1.61 (41)	1.30 (33)	33.01 (839)
Average snowfall inches (cm)	7.3 (19)	7.7 (20)	7.7 (20)	3.7 (9.4)	0.1 (0.25)	0.0 (0.0)	0.0 (0.0)	0.0 (0.0)	0.0 (0.0)	0.7 (1.8)	8.8 (22)	8.8 (22)	44.8 (114.45)
Average precipitation days (≥ 0.01 in)	7.9	6.6	7.1	9.6	12.1	12.8	10.6	9.9	9.6	10.5	7.2	8.0	111.9
Average snowy days (≥ 0.1 in)	7.1	5.5	4.2	1.6	0.1	0.0	0.0	0.0	0.0	0.7	3.7	6.7	29.6
Source 1: NOAA
Source 2: National Weather Service (mean maxima/minima 1981–2010)

== History ==
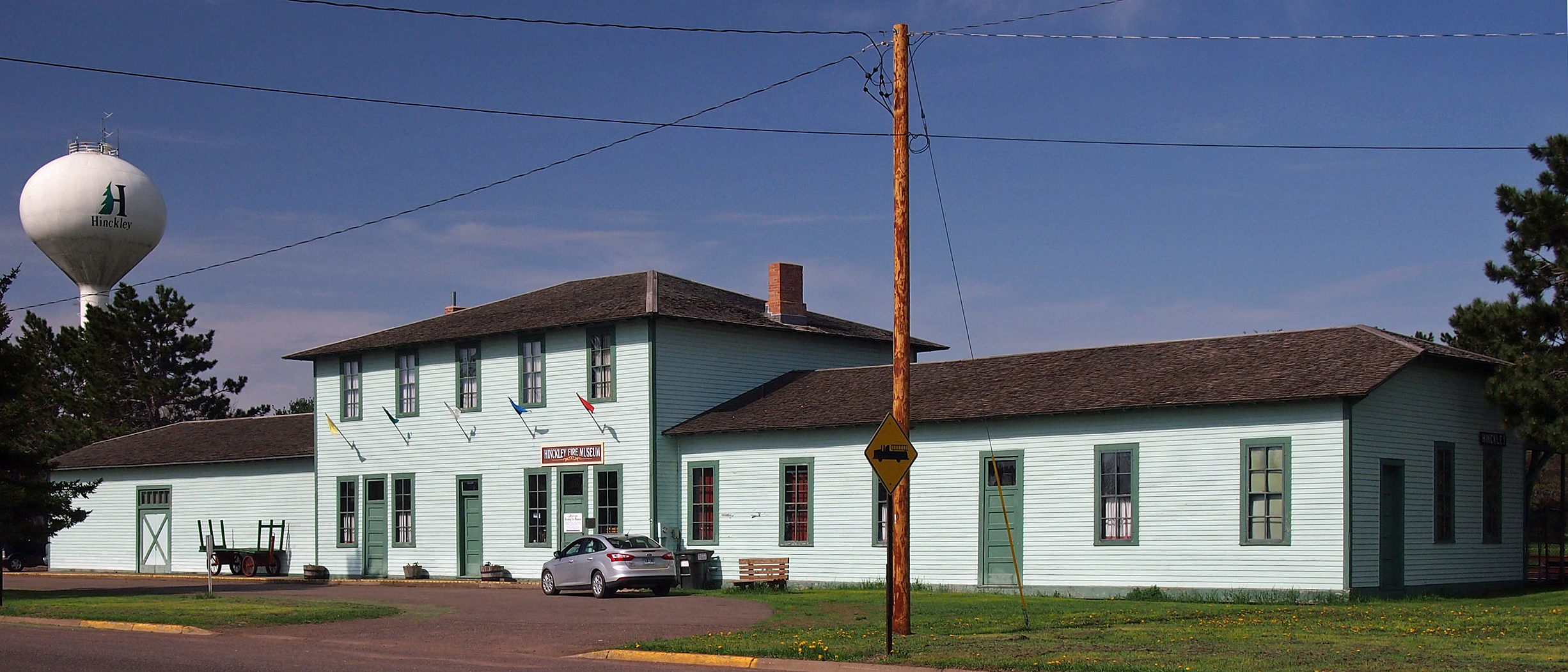
The Hinckley Fire Museum and Hinckley water tower

The Ojibwe Indians were the first people to settle the Hinckley area. They trapped and hunted on the land and traded furs at the Mille Lacs and Pokegama trading posts.

When European settlers came to the Hinckley area, it was a heavily forested area with thick forests of white pine, some of the largest in the state. The first railroad arrived in Hinckley in 1869; and so began a logging and railroad expansion.

Hinckley was founded as the Village of Central Station in 1885, the village was re-incorporated as the City of Hinckley in 1907. Both names were after Hinckley Township where the city is located within. Surrounding Hinckley Township was known as Central Station by the railroads because of its position halfway between the Twin Ports of Duluth and Superior as well as the Twin Cities of Minneapolis and St. Paul. Hinckley Township was named in 1870 after Isaac Hinckley, president of the Philadelphia, Wilmington and Baltimore Railroad.

By 1894, Hinckley was a prosperous community that had everything needed to serve residents and the fast-expanding lumber industry.

On September 1, 1894, everything changed with a firestorm wiping out Hinckley and many northeastern Minnesota towns, killing over 400 people in the immediate and surrounding areas of town. Today the Hinckley Fire Museum, nine blocks west of Interstate 35 in downtown Hinckley, tells the devastating story of what came to be called the Great Hinckley Fire and the town's recovery from it. The museum is located in a restored railroad depot downtown, an exact replica of the pre-fire depot, built just after the fire on the exact same spot.

After the fire, the burned stumps of the forests were cleared to take advantage of the now nutrient-rich soil. Hinckley's recovery would hinge on agriculture. Some of the main crops were potatoes, fruits and vegetables. The early harvests were bountiful. Abundant clover helped feed milk cows for a brisk dairy industry.

Following the national trend in farming, Hinckley has lost most of its agricultural underpinnings.

The Mille Lacs Band of Ojibwe opened Grand Casino Hinckley in 1992.

== Demographics ==
Historical population
Census	Pop.	Note	%±
1890	618		—
1900	459		−25.7%
1910	673		46.6%
1920	673		0.0%
1930	682		1.3%
1940	873		28.0%
1950	902		3.3%
1960	851		−5.7%
1970	885		4.0%
1980	963		8.8%
1990	946		−1.8%
2000	1,291		36.5%
2010	1,800		39.4%
2020	1,904		5.8%
U.S. Decennial Census

=== 2020 census ===
As of the 2020 census, Hinckley had a population of 1,904. The median age was 35.9 years. 28.7% of residents were under the age of 18 and 15.9% of residents were 65 years of age or older. For every 100 females there were 98.3 males, and for every 100 females age 18 and over there were 95.3 males age 18 and over.

0.0% of residents lived in urban areas, while 100.0% lived in rural areas.

There were 771 households in Hinckley, of which 30.1% had children under the age of 18 living in them. Of all households, 28.5% were married-couple households, 24.4% were households with a male householder and no spouse or partner present, and 35.0% were households with a female householder and no spouse or partner present. About 35.3% of all households were made up of individuals and 15.4% had someone living alone who was 65 years of age or older.

There were 843 housing units, of which 8.5% were vacant. The homeowner vacancy rate was 2.5% and the rental vacancy rate was 3.8%.

Racial composition as of the 2020 census
Race	Number	Percent
White	1,347	70.7%
Black or African American	23	1.2%
American Indian and Alaska Native	324	17.0%
Asian	42	2.2%
Native Hawaiian and Other Pacific Islander	1	0.1%
Some other race	19	1.0%
Two or more races	148	7.8%
Hispanic or Latino (of any race)	50	2.6%

=== 2010 census ===
As of the census of 2010, there were 1,800 people, 736 households, and 409 families living in the city. The population density was 476.2 inhabitants per square mile (183.9/km^{2}). There were 785 housing units at an average density of 207.7 per square mile (80.2/km^{2}). The racial makeup of the city was 82.4% White, 1.1% African American, 10.3% Native American, 0.8% Asian, 0.3% from other races, and 5.1% from two or more races. Hispanic or Latino of any race were 3.5% of the population.

There were 736 households, of which 33.4% had children under the age of 18 living with them, 31.0% were married couples living together, 17.0% had a female householder with no husband present, 7.6% had a male householder with no wife present, and 44.4% were non-families. 35.1% of all households were made up of individuals, and 19.2% had someone living alone who was 65 years of age or older. The average household size was 2.44 and the average family size was 3.05.

The median age in the city was 32.5 years. 28.4% of residents were under the age of 18; 9.5% were between the ages of 18 and 24; 26.3% were from 25 to 44; 21.4% were from 45 to 64; and 14.5% were 65 years of age or older. The gender makeup of the city was 48.5% male and 51.5% female.

=== 2000 census ===
As of the census of 2000, there were 1,291 people, 551 households, and 332 families living in the city. The population density was 454.3 inhabitants per square mile (175.4/km^{2}). There were 614 housing units at an average density of 216.0 per square mile (83.4/km^{2}). The racial makeup of the city was 91.87% White, 0.15% African American, 5.81% Native American, 0.70% Asian, 0.08% from other races, and 1.39% from two or more races. Hispanic or Latino of any race were 1.08% of the population.

There were 551 households, out of which 33.9% had children under the age of 18 living with them, 39.2% were married couples living together, 17.2% had a female householder with no husband present, and 39.7% were non-families. 34.5% of all households were made up of individuals, and 16.0% had someone living alone who was 65 years of age or older. The average household size was 2.33 and the average family size was 2.95.

In the city, the population was spread out, with 28.4% under the age of 18, 8.7% from 18 to 24, 29.0% from 25 to 44, 19.8% from 45 to 64, and 14.2% who were 65 years of age or older. The median age was 34 years. For every 100 females, there were 82.6 males. For every 100 females age 18 and over, there were 71.9 males.

The median income for a household in the city was $29,338, and the median income for a family was $37,313. Males had a median income of $29,167 versus $21,375 for females. The per capita income for the city was $15,537. About 12.5% of families and 12.4% of the population were below the poverty line, including 17.8% of those under age 18 and 11.6% of those age 65 or over.

== Education ==
It is a part of Hinckley-Finlayson Public Schools. The school district was established in 1994 through the consolidation of the Hinckley and Finlayson school districts.

== Notable people ==
The following list includes those who were either born in, or who have resided (or presently reside) in Hinckley:

- Boston Corbett, soldier; killer of the assassin of Abraham Lincoln, John Wilkes Booth
- John Monk Saunders, screenwriter and novelist
