= Dell Grove Township, Pine County, Minnesota =

Dell Grove Township, Minnesota
- Township
- Location within the state of Minnesota Dell Grove Township, Minnesota (the United States)
- Coordinates: 46°6′36″N 93°0′10″W
- Country: United States
- State: Minnesota
- County: Pine

Area
  - Total: 42.4 sq mi (109.8 km^{2})
  - Land: 41.3 sq mi (106.9 km^{2})
  - Water: 1.1 sq mi (2.9 km^{2})
- Elevation: 1,129 ft (344 m)

Population (2000)
  - Total: 699
  - Density: 17/sq mi (6.5/km^{2})
- Time zone: UTC-6 (Central (CST))
  - Summer (DST): UTC-5 (CDT)
- ZIP code: 55072
- Area code: 320
- FIPS code: 27-15598
- GNIS feature ID: 0663961
- Website: https://dellgrovetownship.com/

Dell Grove Township is a township in Pine County, Minnesota, United States. The population was 699 at the 2000 census.

Dell Grove Township was named for the pine groves in the valley.

== Geography ==
According to the United States Census Bureau, the township has a total area of 42.4 square miles (110 km^{2}), of which 41.3 square miles (107 km^{2}) is land and 1.1 square miles (2.8 km^{2}) (2.64%) is water.

== Demographics ==
As of the census of 2000, there were 699 people, 286 households, and 203 families residing in the township. The population density was 16.9 inhabitants per square mile (6.5/km^{2}). There were 447 housing units at an average density of 10.8 per square mile (4.2/km^{2}). The racial makeup of the township was 96.57% White, 0.43% African American, 1.43% Native American, 0.72% Asian, and 0.86% from two or more races. Hispanic or Latino of any race were 1.14% of the population.

There were 286 households, out of which 29.4% had children under the age of 18 living with them, 62.6% were married couples living together, 4.5% had a female householder with no husband present, and 29.0% were non-families. 24.8% of all households were made up of individuals, and 11.9% had someone living alone who was 65 years of age or older. The average household size was 2.44 and the average family size was 2.89.

In the township the population was spread out, with 23.6% under the age of 18, 6.9% from 18 to 24, 24.6% from 25 to 44, 28.6% from 45 to 64, and 16.3% who were 65 years of age or older. The median age was 43 years. For every 100 females, there were 106.2 males. For every 100 females age 18 and over, there were 106.2 males.

The median income for a household in the township was $41,838, and the median income for a family was $49,271. Males had a median income of $31,875 versus $23,438 for females. The per capita income for the township was $18,399. About 5.2% of families and 9.5% of the population were below the poverty line, including 11.5% of those under age 18 and 3.7% of those age 65 or over.
