= Sturgeon Lake, Minnesota =

City in Minnesota, United States

Sturgeon Lake
- City
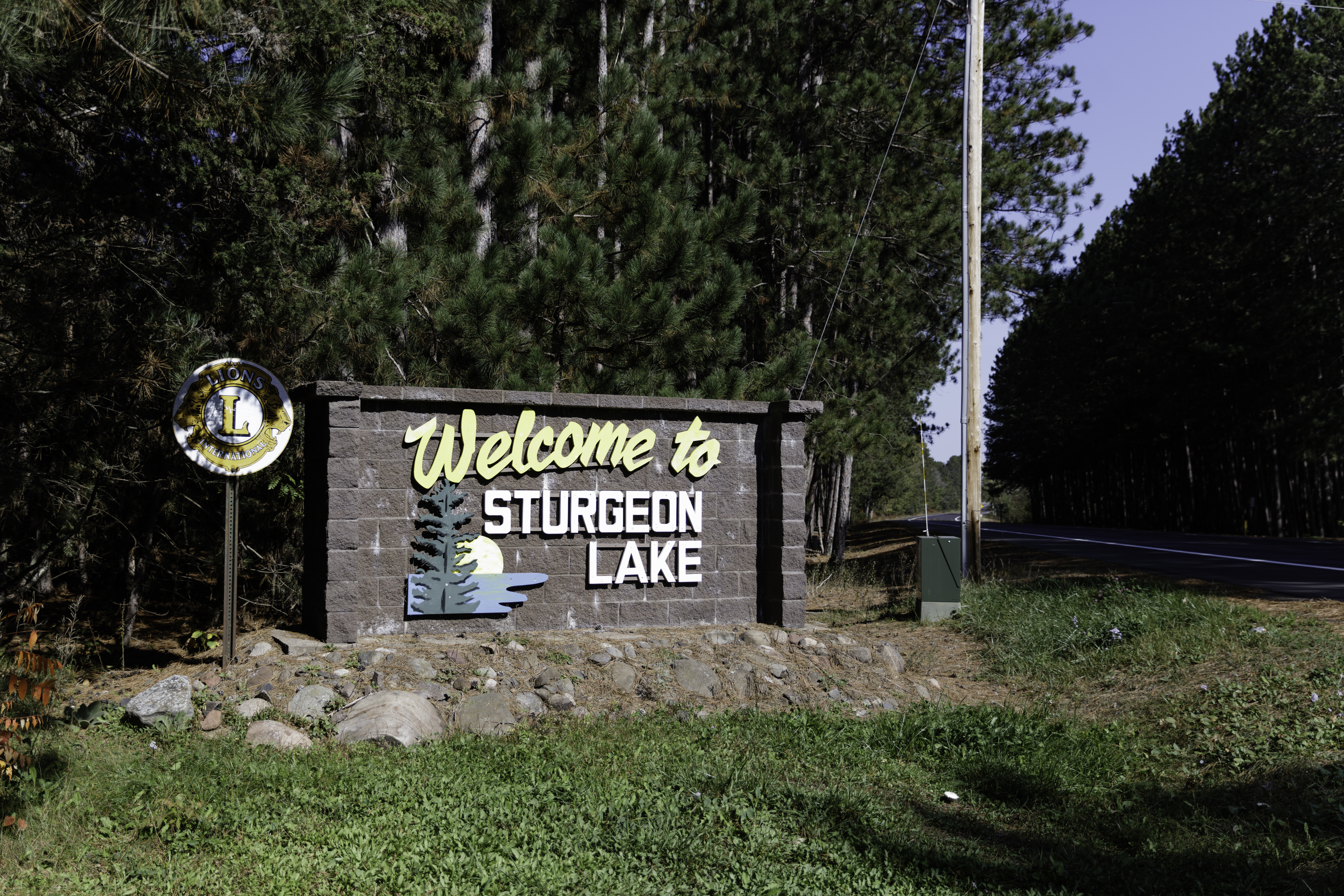
- Welcome To Sturgeon Lake sign

- Location of the city of Sturgeon Lake within Pine County, Minnesota
- Coordinates: 46°23′11″N 92°49′27″W
- Country: United States
- State: Minnesota
- County: Pine
- Incorporated: August 2, 1889

Government
  - Mayor: Todd Danelski

Area
  - Total: 3.80 sq mi (9.83 km^{2})
  - Land: 3.77 sq mi (9.76 km^{2})
  - Water: 0.027 sq mi (0.07 km^{2})
- Elevation: 1,053 ft (321 m)

Population (2020)
  - Total: 436
  - Density: 115.7/sq mi (44.67/km^{2})
  - Demonym: Sturgeon Laker
- Time zone: UTC-6 (Central (CST))
  - Summer (DST): UTC-5 (CDT)
- ZIP code: 55783
- Area code: 218
- FIPS code: 27-63220
- GNIS feature ID: 2395993
- Website: https://www.cityofsturgeonlake.com/

Sturgeon Lake is a city in Pine County, Minnesota, United States. The population was 436 at the 2020 census.

Interstate 35, County Road 46, and County 61 (Main Street) are three of the main routes in the community.

== Geography ==
According to the United States Census Bureau, the city has a total area of 3.69 square miles (9.56 km^{2}), of which 3.66 square miles (9.48 km^{2}) is land and 0.03 square miles (0.08 km^{2}) is water.

== Demographics ==
Historical population
Census	Pop.	Note	%±
1910	183		—
1920	208		13.7%
1930	210		1.0%
1940	215		2.4%
1950	189		−12.1%
1960	151		−20.1%
1970	167		10.6%
1980	222		32.9%
1990	230		3.6%
2000	347		50.9%
2010	439		26.5%
2020	436		−0.7%
U.S. Decennial Census

=== 2010 census ===
As of the census of 2010, there were 439 people, 167 households, and 115 families living in the city. The population density was 119.9 inhabitants per square mile (46.3/km^{2}). There were 258 housing units at an average density of 70.5 per square mile (27.2/km^{2}). The racial makeup of the city was 96.6% White, 0.5% Asian, 0.2% Pacific Islander, 1.4% from other races, and 1.4% from two or more races. Hispanic or Latino of any race were 1.8% of the population.

There were 167 households, of which 37.1% had children under the age of 18 living with them, 54.5% were married couples living together, 12.0% had a female householder with no husband present, 2.4% had a male householder with no wife present, and 31.1% were non-families. 22.2% of all households were made up of individuals, and 10.2% had someone living alone who was 65 years of age or older. The average household size was 2.63 and the average family size was 3.17.

The median age in the city was 36.4 years. 30.8% of residents were under the age of 18; 5.9% were between the ages of 18 and 24; 27.6% were from 25 to 44; 22.1% were from 45 to 64; and 13.7% were 65 years of age or older. The gender makeup of the city was 50.8% male and 49.2% female.

=== 2000 census ===
As of the census of 2000, there were 347 people, 132 households, and 88 families living in the city. The population density was 99.8 inhabitants per square mile (38.5/km^{2}). There were 151 housing units at an average density of 43.4 per square mile (16.8/km^{2}). The racial makeup of the city was 99.14% White, 0.58% Native American, and 0.29% from two or more races. Hispanic or Latino of any race were 0.58% of the population.

There were 132 households, out of which 34.1% had children under the age of 18 living with them, 53.8% were married couples living together, 11.4% had a female householder with no husband present, and 32.6% were non-families. 25.0% of all households were made up of individuals, and 7.6% had someone living alone who was 65 years of age or older. The average household size was 2.63 and the average family size was 3.21.

In the city, the population was spread out, with 28.8% under the age of 18, 8.6% from 18 to 24, 30.8% from 25 to 44, 21.3% from 45 to 64, and 10.4% who were 65 years of age or older. The median age was 33 years. For every 100 females, there were 94.9 males. For every 100 females age 18 and over, there were 100.8 males.

The median income for a household in the city was $36,875, and the median income for a family was $41,389. Males had a median income of $28,750 versus $25,000 for females. The per capita income for the city was $15,501. About 13.3% of families and 15.3% of the population were below the poverty line, including 19.1% of those under age 18 and none of those age 65 or over.

== Notable people ==
- Florian Chmielewski Sr. (born 1927), musician and politician
- George Cunningham (1894–1972), Major League Baseball pitcher
- Clay Wilson (born 1983), ice hockey player

== Gallery ==
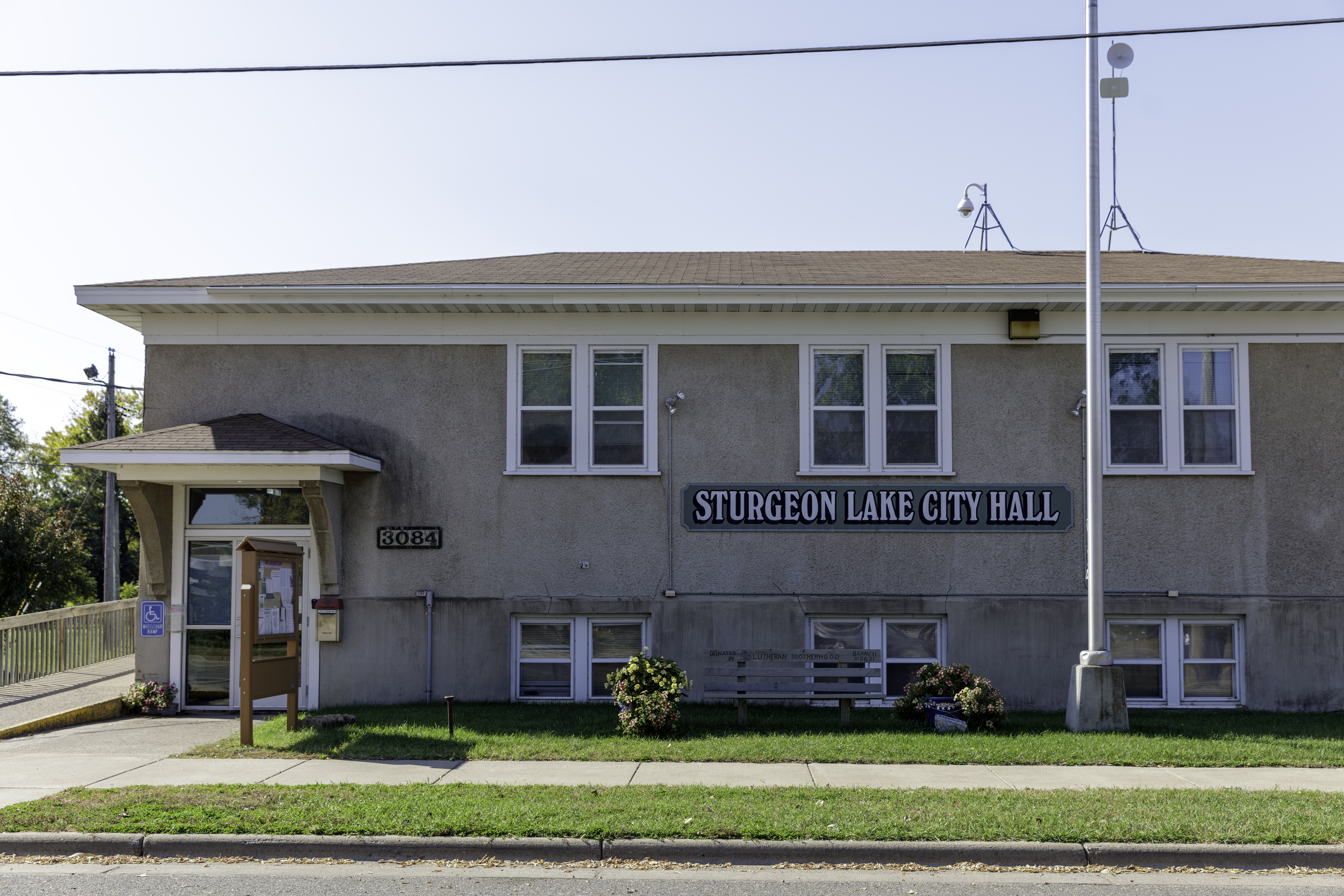
Sturgeon Lake City Hall

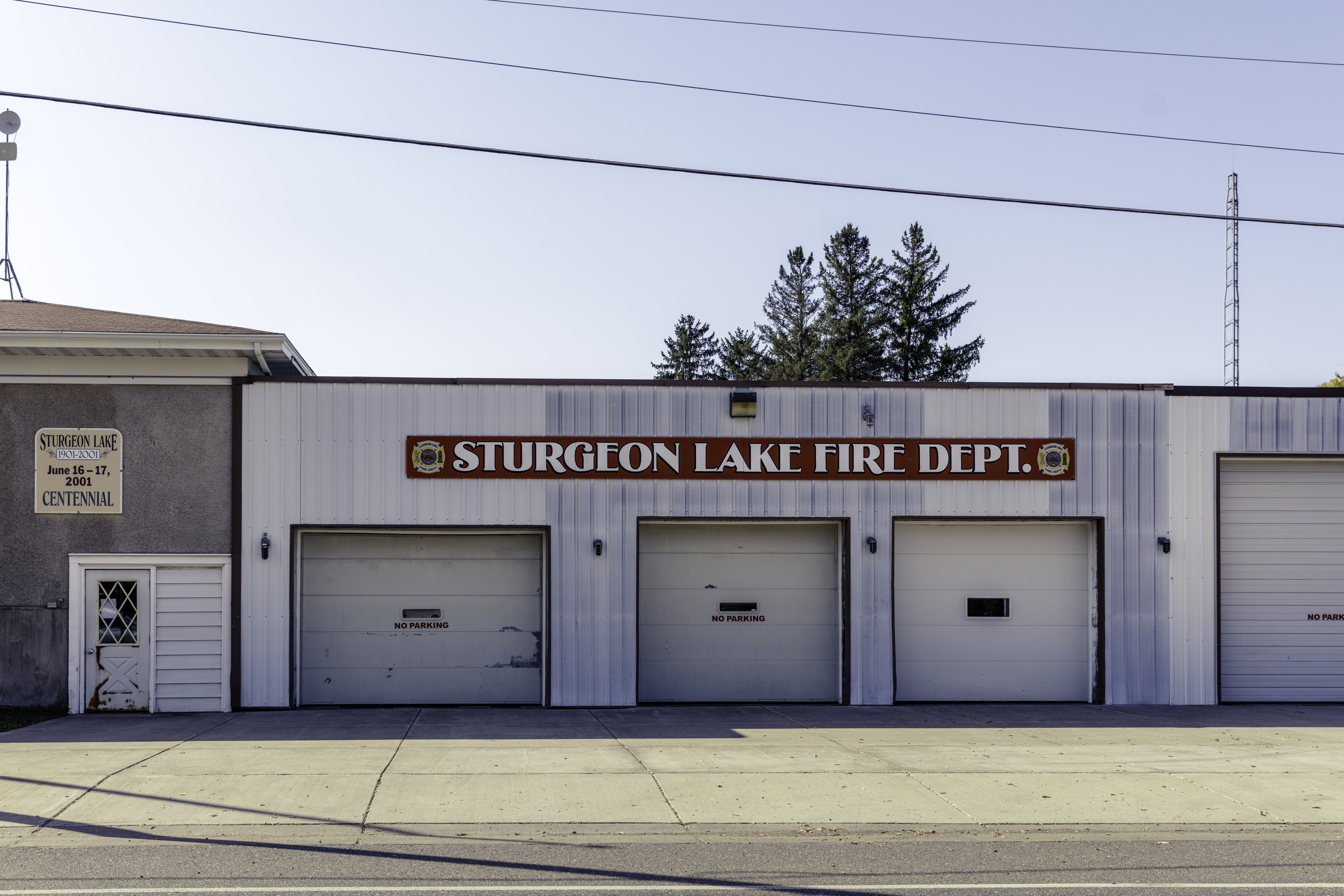
Sturgeon Lake Fire Department

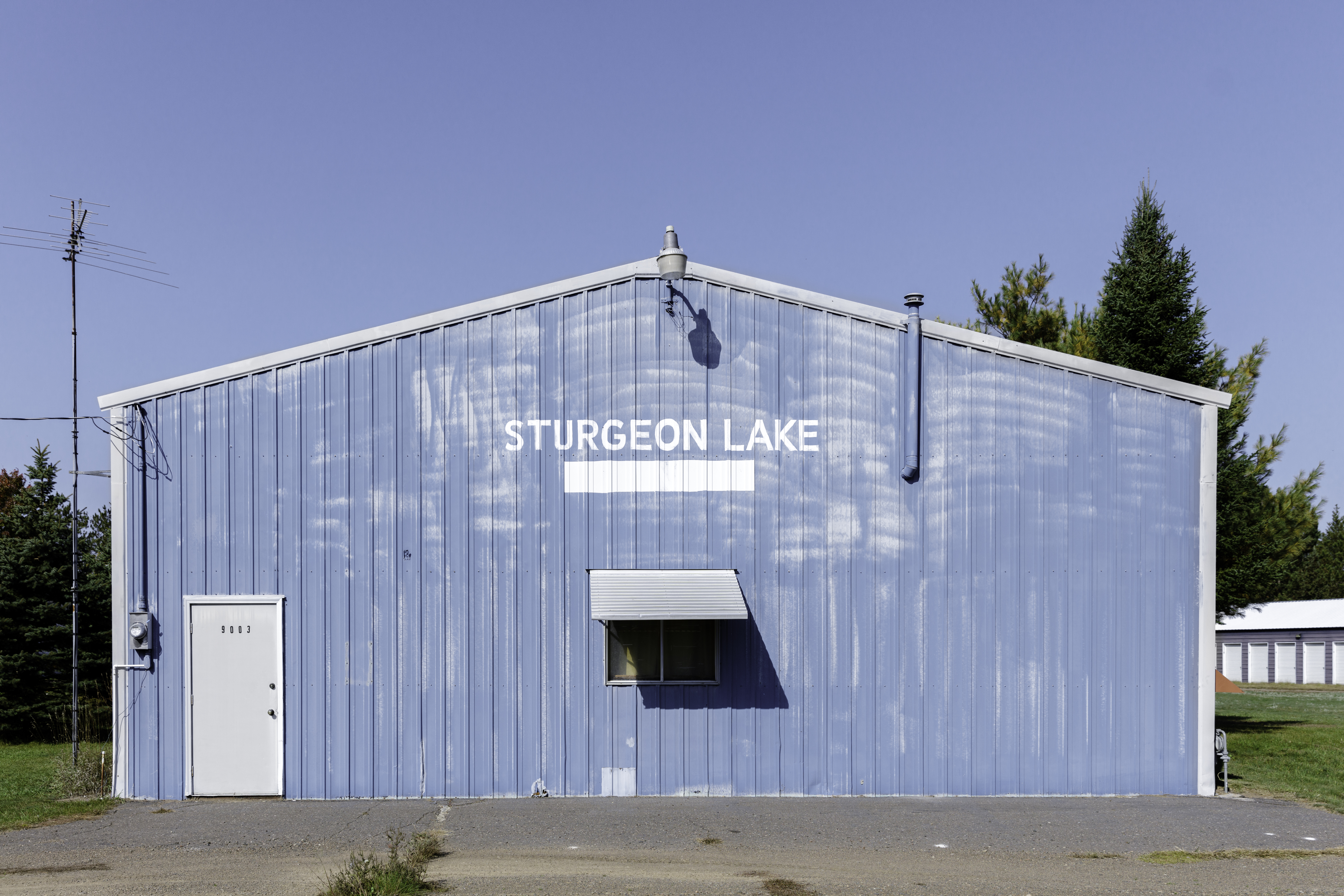
Blue Sturgeon Lake building
