= Pine County, Minnesota =

County in Minnesota, United States

- County
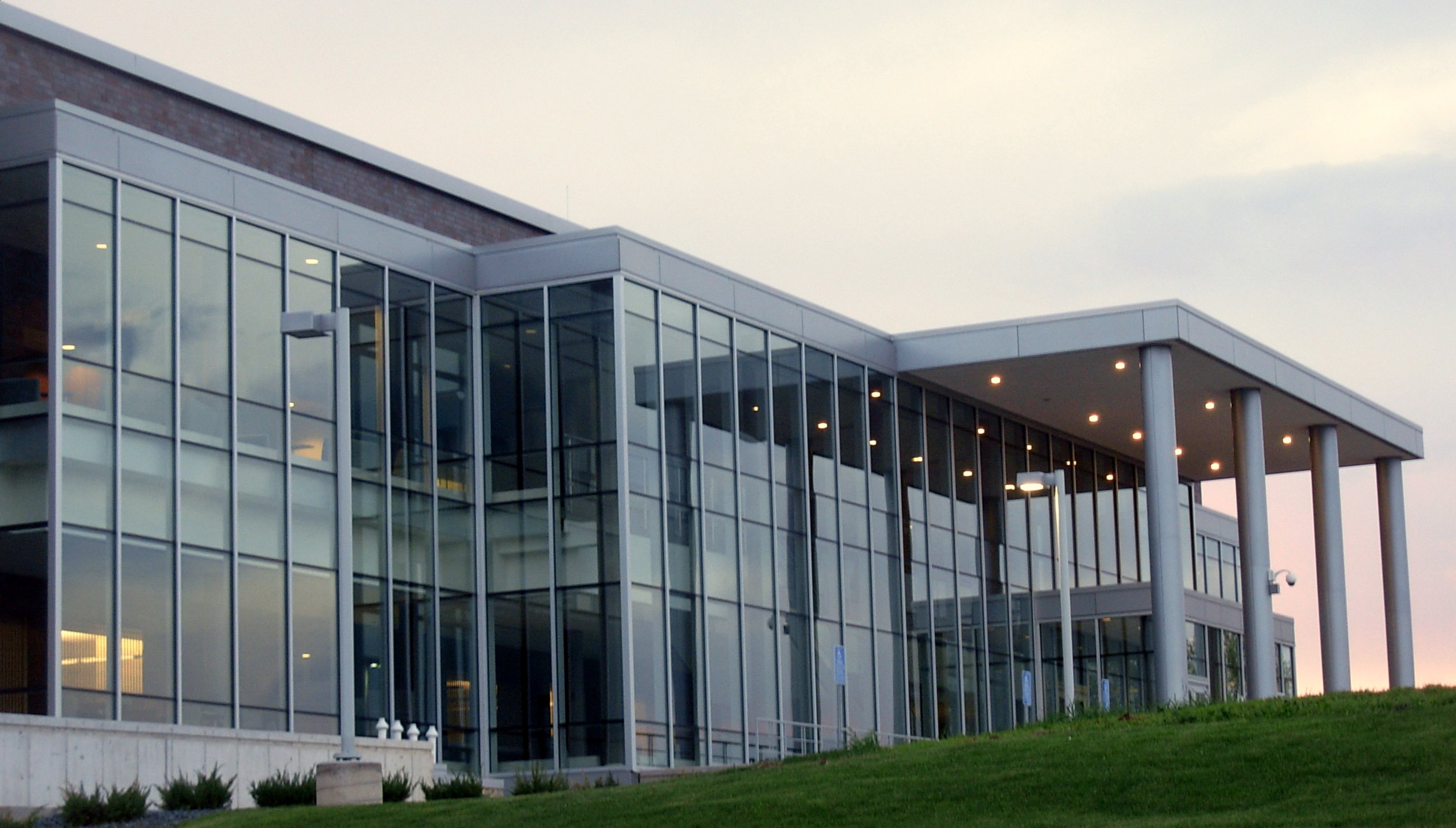
- Pine County Courthouse, Pine City

- Location within the U.S. state of Minnesota
- Coordinates: 46°08′N 92°44′W
- Country: United States
- State: Minnesota
- Founded: March 1, 1856 (created); 1872 (organized)
- Named for: The abundant pine trees in the area
- Seat: Pine City
- Largest city: Pine City

Area
  - Total: 1,435 sq mi (3,720 km^{2})
  - Land: 1,411 sq mi (3,650 km^{2})
  - Water: 23 sq mi (60 km^{2}) 1.6%

Population (2020)
  - Total: 28,876
  - Estimate (2025): 30,472 ▲
  - Density: 20.46/sq mi (7.902/km^{2})
- Time zone: UTC−6 (Central)
  - Summer (DST): UTC−5 (CDT)
- Congressional district: 8th
- Website: www.pinecountymn.gov

Pine County is a county in the U.S. state of Minnesota. As of the 2020 census, the population was 28,876. Its county seat is Pine City. The county was formed in 1856 and organized in 1872. Today, Pine County is the fastest growing county in the state. Part of the Mille Lacs Indian Reservation is in Pine County.

== History ==
Pine County was organized on March 1, 1856, with territory partitioned from Chisago and Ramsey counties. The original county seat was Chengwatana. It was named for its abundant pine tree growth.

In 1857, Buchanan County in full and the southern parts of Aitkin and Carlton Counties were formed from the original Pine County, with Kanabec County organized a year later. In 1861, Buchanan County was dissolved and folded into Pine County. Pine County was reorganized in 1872, with Pine City named as the county seat for the remaining smaller area.

=== Popular culture ===
Pine County has been featured in a series of mysteries by Dean Hovey.

== Geography ==
Pine County lies on the east side of Minnesota. Its southeast border abuts Wisconsin (across the St. Croix River). The St. Croix flows southerly along its border. The Kettle River flows southeastward through central Pine County, discharging into the St. Croix on the county's east border, and the Snake River flows eastward through the lower part of the county toward its discharge point into the St. Croix. The county terrain consists of low rolling hills, carved with drainages, partly wooded and otherwise devoted to agriculture. The terrain slopes to the south and east, with its highest point near its northeast corner, at 1,319 ft (402 m) ASL. The county has an area of 1,435 square miles (3,720 km^{2}), of which 1,411 square miles (3,650 km^{2}) is land and 23 square miles (60 km^{2}) (1.6%) is water. Perhaps the most famous body of water in Pine County is Devil's Lake, which is found on the southeast edge of Pine City, the county seat.

=== Major highways ===
- Interstate 35
- Minnesota State Highway 18
- Minnesota State Highway 23
- Minnesota State Highway 48
- Minnesota State Highway 70
- Minnesota State Highway 107
- Minnesota State Highway 123
- List of county roads

=== Adjacent counties ===
- Carlton County - north
- Douglas County, Wisconsin - northeast
- Burnett County, Wisconsin - east
- Chisago County - south
- Isanti County - southwest
- Kanabec County - west
- Aitkin County - northwest

=== Protected areas ===
- Banning State Park
- Chengwatana State Forest
- DAR Memorial State Forest
- General C. C. Andrews State Forest
- Kettle River Scientific and Natural Area
- Nemadji State Forest (part)
- Pine County State Game Refuge
- Saint Croix National Scenic Riverway (part)
- St. Croix State Park
- Wild River State Park (part)

== Demographics ==
Historical population
Census	Pop.	Note	%±
1860	92		—
1870	648		604.3%
1880	1,365		110.6%
1890	4,052		196.8%
1900	11,546		184.9%
1910	15,878		37.5%
1920	21,117		33.0%
1930	20,264		−4.0%
1940	21,478		6.0%
1950	18,223		−15.2%
1960	17,004		−6.7%
1970	16,821		−1.1%
1980	19,871		18.1%
1990	21,264		7.0%
2000	26,530		24.8%
2010	29,750		12.1%
2020	28,876		−2.9%
2025 (est.)	30,472	▲	5.5%
U.S. Decennial Census; 1790-1960 1900-1990; 1990-2000 2010-2020

=== 2020 census ===
As of the 2020 census, the county had a population of 28,876. The median age was 45.1 years. 20.4% of residents were under the age of 18 and 20.7% of residents were 65 years of age or older. For every 100 females there were 114.3 males, and for every 100 females age 18 and over there were 116.7 males age 18 and over.

The racial makeup of the county was 88.2% White, 1.7% Black or African American, 3.5% American Indian and Alaska Native, 0.9% Asian, <0.1% Native Hawaiian and Pacific Islander, 0.8% from some other race, and 4.9% from two or more races. Hispanic or Latino residents of any race comprised 2.5% of the population.

<0.1% of residents lived in urban areas, while 100.0% lived in rural areas.

There were 11,442 households in the county, of which 25.3% had children under the age of 18 living in them. Of all households, 48.2% were married-couple households, 21.2% were households with a male householder and no spouse or partner present, and 21.2% were households with a female householder and no spouse or partner present. About 28.9% of all households were made up of individuals and 13.8% had someone living alone who was 65 years of age or older.

There were 16,886 housing units, of which 32.2% were vacant. Among occupied housing units, 80.2% were owner-occupied and 19.8% were renter-occupied. The homeowner vacancy rate was 1.5% and the rental vacancy rate was 5.8%.

=== Racial and ethnic composition ===
Pine County, Minnesota – Racial and ethnic composition Note: the US Census treats Hispanic/Latino as an ethnic category. This table excludes Latinos from the racial categories and assigns them to a separate category. Hispanics/Latinos may be of any race.
Race / Ethnicity (NH = Non-Hispanic)	Pop 1980	Pop 1990	Pop 2000	Pop 2010	Pop 2020	% 1980	% 1990	% 2000	% 2010	% 2020
White alone (NH)	19,254	20,137	24,702	26,924	25,119	96.89%	94.70%	93.11%	90.50%	86.99%
Black or African American alone (NH)	143	324	335	576	470	0.72%	1.52%	1.26%	1.94%	1.63%
Native American or Alaska Native alone (NH)	273	359	699	890	966	1.37%	1.69%	2.63%	2.99%	3.35%
Asian alone (NH)	105	81	80	129	264	0.53%	0.38%	0.30%	0.43%	0.91%
Native Hawaiian or Pacific Islander alone (NH)	x	x	8	8	1	x	x	0.03%	0.03%	0.00%
Other race alone (NH)	12	15	13	4	98	0.06%	0.07%	0.05%	0.01%	0.34%
Mixed race or Multiracial (NH)	x	x	228	496	1,245	x	x	0.86%	1.67%	4.31%
Hispanic or Latino (any race)	84	348	465	723	713	0.42%	1.64%	1.75%	2.43%	2.47%
Total	19,871	21,264	26,530	29,750	28,876	100.00%	100.00%	100.00%	100.00%	100.00%

=== 2000 census ===
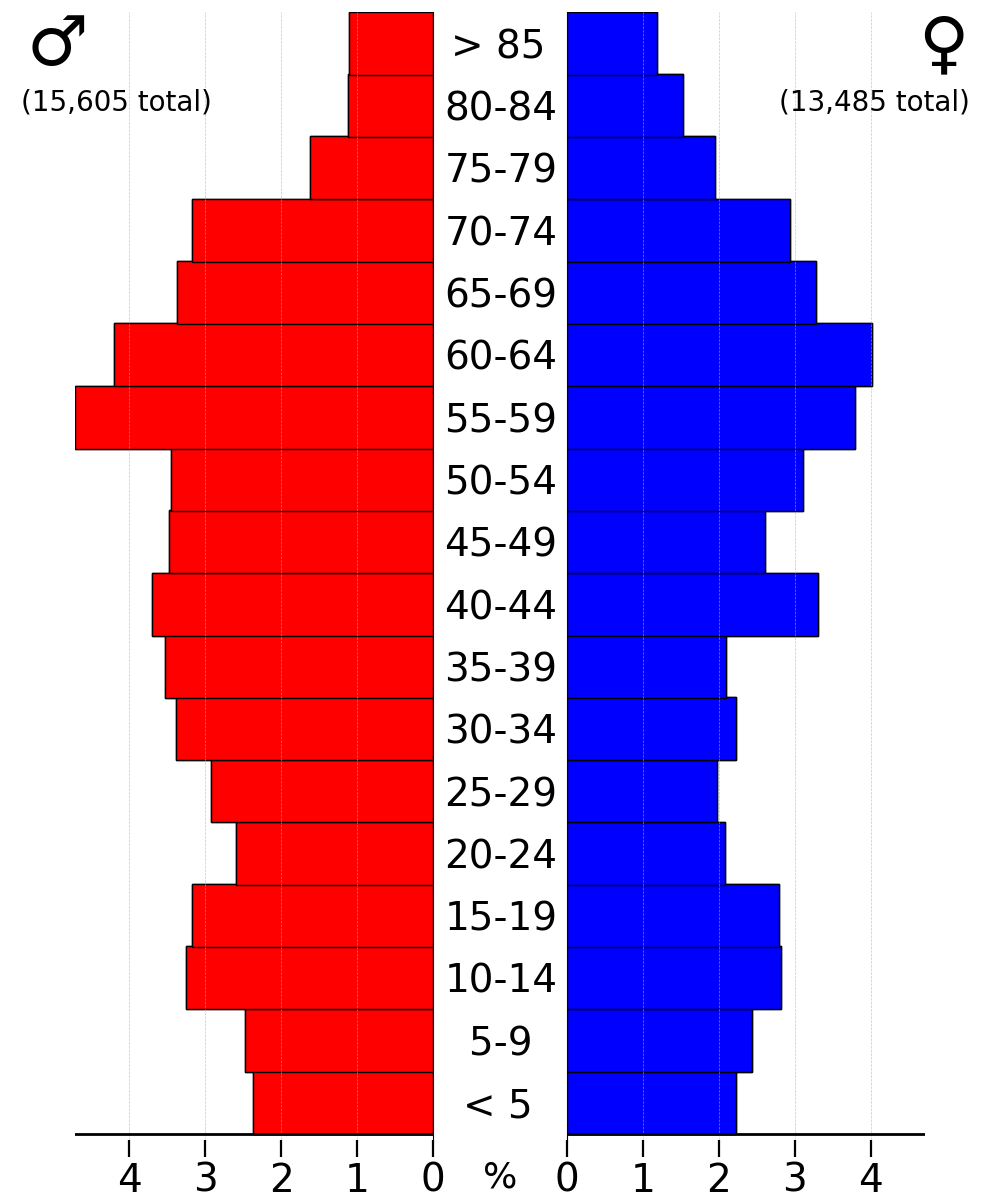
2022 US Census population pyramid for Pine County, from ACS 5-year estimates

As of the census of 2000, there were 26,530 people, 9,939 households, and 6,917 families in the county. The population density was 18.8 per square mile (7.3/km^{2}). There were 15,353 housing units at an average density of 10.9 per square mile (4.2/km^{2}). The racial makeup of the county was 91.9% White, 2.0% Black or African American, 3.1% Native American, 0.30% Asian, 0.03% Pacific Islander, 0.4% from other races, and 1.9% from two or more races. 2.4% of the population were Hispanic or Latino of any race. 32.3% were of German, 11.6% Swedish, 11.1% Norwegian and 5.5% American ancestry.

There were 17,276 households, out of which 31.20% had children under the age of 18 living with them, 56.50% were married couples living together, 8.70% had a female householder with no husband present, and 30.40% were non-families. 25.10% of all households were made up of individuals, and 10.90% had someone living alone who was 65 years of age or older. The average household size was 2.53 and the average family size was 3.02.

The county population contained 25.50% under the age of 18, 7.70% from 18 to 24, 27.90% from 25 to 44, 23.90% from 45 to 64, and 15.00% who were 65 years of age or older. The median age was 38 years. For every 100 females there were 108.80 males. For every 100 females age 18 and over, there were 108.30 males.

The median income for a household in the county was $37,379, and the median income for a family was $44,058. Males had a median income of $31,600 versus $22,675 for females. The per capita income for the county was $17,445. About 7.80% of families and 11.30% of the population were below the poverty line, including 14.60% of those under age 18 and 10.00% of those age 65 or over.

== Communities ==
=== Cities ===
- Askov (originally Partridge)
- Brook Park (originally Pokegama Creek)
- Bruno
- Denham
- Finlayson
- Henriette (originally Cornell)
- Hinckley (originally Central Station)
- Kerrick
- Pine City (county seat)
- Rock Creek
- Rutledge (originally Kettle River)
- Sandstone
- Sturgeon Lake
- Willow River

=== Unincorporated communities ===
- Beroun (originally Cross Lake, then Brown's Hill)
- Cloverdale
- Cloverton
- Duquette
- Duxbury
- Ellson
- Friesland (originally Del Grove)
- Greeley
- Groningen (originally Miller's Station, then Belknap)
- Kingsdale
- Lake Lena
- Markville
- Mission Creek
- Nickerson
- Pokegama
- West Rock

=== Ghost towns ===
- Belden
- Banning
- Big Spring
- Blomskog
- Chengwatana
- Cornell
- Clint
- Crooked River
- Danewood
- Eaglehead
- Harlis
- Midway
- Milburn
- Mission Creek
- Outflow
- St. John
- Sand River
- Tozer Camp
- Turpville
- Tuxedo
- Villstad
- Wareham

=== Townships ===
- Arlone Township
- Arna Township
- Barry Township
- Birch Creek Township
- Bremen Township
- Brook Park Township
- Bruno Township
- Chengwatana Township
- Clover Township
- Crosby Township
- Danforth Township
- Dell Grove Township
- Finlayson Township
- Fleming Township
- Hinckley Township
- Kerrick Township
- Kettle River Township
- Mission Creek Township
- Munch Township
- New Dosey Township
- Nickerson Township
- Norman Township
- Ogema Township
- Park Township
- Partridge Township
- Pine City Township
- Pine Lake Township
- Pokegama Township
- Royalton Township
- Sandstone Township
- Sturgeon Lake Township
- Wilma Township
- Windemere Township

== Politics ==
Pine County was once a Democratic stronghold. Between 1932 and 2008, Democrats won the county all but twice, with the two exceptions being nationwide Republican landslide victories in 1952 by Dwight D. Eisenhower and in 1972 by Richard Nixon (by only 87 votes). The tides began to turn in Pine County at the beginning of the 21st century, as the first three elections in that century, while still Democratic wins, only saw them win with a plurality of the vote and never by more than a 2.5% margin. The Democratic streak finally broke in 2012, when Republican challenger Mitt Romney barely won the county over incumbent Democrat Barack Obama by less than 1% and a margin of just 95 votes, becoming the first Republican to win the county in 40 years. The 2016 election saw a dramatic rightward turn, as Donald Trump won the county by a margin of over 26%, and he further increased his margin of victory to over 30% in 2020 and over 35% in 2024, as Trump in 2020 became the first Republican to win over 60% of the vote in Pine County since Warren G. Harding a century earlier. In the 2018 midterms, Pine County voted for every Republican candidate running for statewide office, with the exception in the senate race, where it narrowly voted to re-elect Democratic Senator Amy Klobuchar (it would later go on to vote against her in her successful 2024 re-election bid). This trend also continued in 2022, with Pine County voting Republican for all statewide office and in the concurrent US House race, solidifying the county's realignment to Republicans.

United States presidential election results for Pine County, Minnesota
Year	Republican		Democratic		Third party(ies)	
Year	No.	%	No.	%	No.	%
1892	538	48.42%	458	41.22%	115	10.35%
1896	1,152	55.46%	875	42.13%	50	2.41%
1900	1,121	59.06%	726	38.25%	51	2.69%
1904	1,743	74.23%	463	19.72%	142	6.05%
1908	1,548	56.43%	802	29.24%	393	14.33%
1912	513	17.04%	777	25.81%	1,720	57.14%
1916	1,531	44.38%	1,507	43.68%	412	11.94%
1920	3,879	66.83%	1,127	19.42%	798	13.75%
1924	2,706	42.03%	469	7.28%	3,263	50.68%
1928	4,278	56.53%	3,185	42.09%	105	1.39%
1932	2,304	29.53%	4,862	62.33%	635	8.14%
1936	2,452	28.39%	5,797	67.11%	389	4.50%
1940	4,106	43.10%	5,263	55.25%	157	1.65%
1944	3,433	43.85%	4,332	55.33%	64	0.82%
1948	3,069	36.51%	4,978	59.21%	360	4.28%
1952	4,255	52.94%	3,692	45.93%	91	1.13%
1956	3,204	45.50%	3,829	54.38%	8	0.11%
1960	3,450	44.88%	4,211	54.78%	26	0.34%
1964	2,279	30.71%	5,123	69.04%	18	0.24%
1968	2,591	36.41%	4,044	56.82%	482	6.77%
1972	3,881	48.41%	3,794	47.32%	342	4.27%
1976	3,057	34.40%	5,442	61.24%	388	4.37%
1980	3,899	40.25%	5,121	52.86%	667	6.89%
1984	4,493	45.95%	5,223	53.41%	63	0.64%
1988	3,857	40.54%	5,540	58.24%	116	1.22%
1992	2,841	26.27%	4,929	45.58%	3,043	28.14%
1996	3,080	29.88%	5,432	52.70%	1,796	17.42%
2000	5,854	44.80%	6,148	47.05%	1,066	8.16%
2004	7,033	48.44%	7,228	49.79%	257	1.77%
2008	6,862	47.71%	7,084	49.25%	437	3.04%
2012	6,845	49.02%	6,750	48.34%	370	2.65%
2016	8,191	59.31%	4,580	33.16%	1,040	7.53%
2020	10,256	64.10%	5,419	33.87%	326	2.04%
2024	11,274	66.67%	5,339	31.57%	298	1.76%

== See also ==
- National Register of Historic Places listings in Pine County, Minnesota
