= Willow River, Minnesota =

City in Minnesota, United States

Willow River
- City
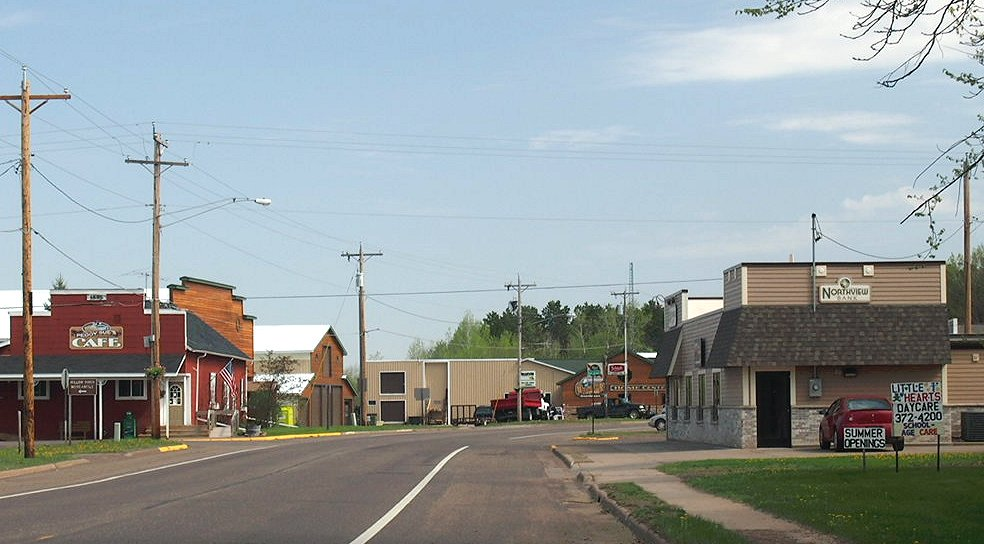
- Willow River at Pine County 61 and Main Street

- Location of the city of Willow River within Pine County, Minnesota
- Coordinates: 46°19′14″N 92°50′05″W
- Country: United States
- State: Minnesota
- County: Pine
- Incorporated: November 7, 1891

Government
  - Mayor: Brent Switzer

Area
  - Total: 1.90 sq mi (4.92 km^{2})
  - Land: 1.75 sq mi (4.54 km^{2})
  - Water: 0.15 sq mi (0.38 km^{2})
- Elevation: 1,047 ft (319 m)

Population (2020)
  - Total: 384
  - Density: 219.0/sq mi (84.57/km^{2})
  - Demonym: Willow Riveran
- Time zone: UTC-6 (Central (CST))
  - Summer (DST): UTC-5 (CDT)
- ZIP code: 55795
- Area code: 218
- FIPS code: 27-70492
- GNIS feature ID: 2397324
- Website: https://www.cityofwillowriver.com/

Willow River is a city in Pine County, Minnesota, United States, at the confluence of the Kettle and Willow Rivers. As of the 2020 census, Willow River had a population of 384.

Interstate 35, County Road 43, and County 61 (Cross Street) are three of the main routes in the community.

== History ==
The first known settlement in what was to become the Village of Willow River, at the junctions of the Willow and Kettle Rivers, was an encampment of Indigenous Ojibwe peoples.

In July 1850, a roadway connecting the upper Mississippi River and the Lake Superior country, named the Point Douglas to St. Louis River Road, and more commonly known as the government military road, went from just south of St. Paul to Duluth. Willow River was chosen as a changing station for the coach horses.

In 1861 the Lake Superior and Mississippi Railroad was organized with the financial help of Jay Cooke. It was only in August 1879 that the completed line from St. Paul to Duluth was opened. The railroad helped settle and promote living in the northern part of Minnesota. The railroad also promoted the lumber industry. Many towns and villages, including Willow River, were organized once a lumber company set up shop.

In March 1874, the Kettle River Township was organized and Willow River at this time consisted of a railroad depot, water tank, wood yard, and two section houses built for the railroad hands.

Pine County records show that the three sections of land that would eventually make up the village of Willow River were homesteaded by Edward Clough, Albert Kinney, Peter Jarvis, Joseph Nebula, and Richard Abbott. In 1886, Abbott sold his section of land to the Fox-Wisdom Lumber Company. In 1888, Jarvis sold his section to Fox-Wisdom. In the spring of 1890, Warren D. Fox and John Wisdom opened the Fox-Wisdom Lumber Company in Willow River. The company then platted the land to build their business and offer lots for employees. By 1895, Kinney had leased his land to Fox-Wisdom, and Clough had sold all but 80 acres of his section in the northern part of the village. Joseph Nebula's section was past the lake and likely unusable to the company.

The Fox-Wisdom Lumber Company sawmill was constructed and opened in March 1890. It was located on the south side of the present day Willow River dam. To ease the flow of logs, dams were built along the river to store water. There were as least three built and maintained by Fox-Wisdom. They were known as the "Mile and a Half," the "Willow Lake," and the "Oak Lake" dams. Sawmill operations began in the early spring and continued until the freeze-up of the mill pond. The mill produced lumber, lath, and shingles employing about 125 men. The mill cut 125,000 feet of lumber per day during their peak season. Many who worked in the logging camps during the winter came to the mill to work in the spring.

On May 8, 1891, the village plat was filed in Pine County. The Fox-Wisdom Lumber Company and its employees made up the majority of property owners. Willow River, like many other villages in northern Minnesota, owed its existence to the lumber industry. In November 1891, Willow River was incorporated as a village by a vote of 37 to 18 in the upstairs hall of the Fox-Wisdom Company store.

== Geography ==
According to the United States Census Bureau, the city has a total area of 1.86 square miles (4.82 km^{2}), of which 1.71 square miles (4.43 km^{2}) is land and 0.15 square miles (0.39 km^{2}) is water.

== Demographics ==
Historical population
| Census | Pop. | Note | %± |
|---|---|---|---|
| 1900 | 466 | | — |
| 1910 | 212 | | −54.5% |
| 1920 | 247 | | 16.5% |
| 1930 | 253 | | 2.4% |
| 1940 | 314 | | 24.1% |
| 1950 | 294 | | −6.4% |
| 1960 | 343 | | 16.7% |
| 1970 | 331 | | −3.5% |
| 1980 | 303 | | −8.5% |
| 1990 | 284 | | −6.3% |
| 2000 | 309 | | 8.8% |
| 2010 | 415 | | 34.3% |
| 2020 | 384 | | −7.5% |
U.S. Decennial Census

=== 2010 census ===
As of the census of 2010, there were 415 people, 173 households, and 103 families residing in the city. The population density was 242.7 inhabitants per square mile (93.7/km^{2}). There were 199 housing units at an average density of 116.4 per square mile (44.9/km^{2}). The racial makeup of the city was 95.7% White, 0.2% African American, 1.4% Native American, 0.2% from other races, and 2.4% from two or more races. Hispanic or Latino of any race were 2.2% of the population.

There were 173 households, of which 31.2% had children under the age of 18 living with them, 41.0% were married couples living together, 13.3% had a female householder with no husband present, 5.2% had a male householder with no wife present, and 40.5% were non-families. 35.8% of all households were made up of individuals, and 13.9% had someone living alone who was 65 years of age or older. The average household size was 2.40 and the average family size was 3.03.

The median age in the city was 35.1 years. 26% of residents were under the age of 18; 9.2% were between the ages of 18 and 24; 28.9% were from 25 to 44; 23.5% were from 45 to 64; and 12.3% were 65 years of age or older. The gender makeup of the city was 47.7% male and 52.3% female.

=== 2000 census ===
As of the census of 2000, there were 301 people, 130 households, and 69 families residing in the city. The population density was 196.7 inhabitants per square mile (75.9/km^{2}). There were 155 housing units at an average density of 98.7 per square mile (38.1/km^{2}). The racial makeup of the city was 92.88% White, 4.53% Native American, 0.97% from other races, and 1.62% from two or more races. Hispanic or Latino of any race were 1.94% of the population.

There were 129 households, out of which 31.0% had children under the age of 18 living with them, 41.1% were married couples living together, 10.1% had a female householder with no husband present, and 45.7% were non-families. 39.5% of all households were made up of individuals, and 20.9% had someone living alone who was 65 years of age or older. The average household size was 2.40 and the average family size was 3.37.

In the city, the population was spread out, with 28.5% under the age of 18, 12.0% from 18 to 24, 24.9% from 25 to 44, 19.7% from 45 to 64, and 14.9% who were 65 years of age or older. The median age was 34 years. For every 100 females, there were 98.1 males. For every 100 females age 18 and over, there were 92.2 males.

The median income for a household in the city was $25,938, and the median income for a family was $44,167. Males had a median income of $37,656 versus $25,417 for females. The per capita income for the city was $16,620. About 16.1% of families and 16.9% of the population were below the poverty line, including 21.3% of those under the age of eighteen and 18.6% of those 65 or over.

== Notable person ==
- Ernie Nevers, professional football player
