= Cloverton, Minnesota =

Cloverton
- Unincorporated community
- Location within Minnesota Location within the United States
- Coordinates: 46°10′05″N 92°19′11″W
- Country: United States
- State: Minnesota
- County: Pine
- Township: New Dosey Township
- Elevation: 1,093 ft (333 m)
- Time zone: UTC-6 (Central (CST))
  - Summer (DST): UTC-5 (CDT)
- ZIP code: 55072
- Area code: 320
- GNIS feature ID: 641361

Cloverton is an unincorporated community in New Dosey Township, Pine County, Minnesota, United States.

The community is located east of Sandstone; at the junction of Cloverton Road (Pine County 31) and Rutabaga Road (County 32). The Gandy Dancer Trail passes through Cloverton. Hay Creek and the Upper Tamarack River are both nearby.

Cloverton is located near the Minnesota–Wisconsin state line. Nearby places in Minnesota include Markville, Kingsdale, and Duxbury. Nearby places in Wisconsin include Cozy Corner, Dairyland, and Danbury.

Cloverton is located 28 miles east of Sandstone; and 23 miles east of Askov. Cloverton is four miles west of Cozy Corner, WI; and nine miles west-southwest of Dairyland. Douglas County Road T is nearby.

The Nemadji State Forest and the Saint Croix State Forest are both nearby.

Cloverton is 32 miles northeast of Cloverdale; and 18 miles north of Danbury.

The community is located within ZIP code 55072 based in Sandstone.

== History ==
Cloverton was named for wild clover in the area and for the Red Clover Land Company, a major landowner in the township in 1916. The Soo Line Railroad opened in the community in 1911. A post office operated in Cloverton from 1912 until 1972.
