= Kingsdale, Minnesota =

Kingsdale
- Unincorporated community
- Location within Minnesota Location within the United States
- Coordinates: 46°14′18″N 92°18′42″W
- Country: United States
- State: Minnesota
- County: Pine
- Township: New Dosey Township
- Elevation: 1,161 ft (354 m)
- Time zone: UTC-6 (Central (CST))
  - Summer (DST): UTC-5 (CDT)
- ZIP code: 55072
- Area code: 320
- GNIS feature ID: 646169

Kingsdale is an unincorporated community in New Dosey Township, Pine County, Minnesota, United States.

The community is located east of Askov; at the junction of Pine County Road 31, Kingsdale Road, and Rocky Boulevard.

Rutabaga Road (Pine County 32) is also nearby. Hay Creek flows through the community. The Nemadji State Forest is nearby. The Gandy Dancer Trail passes through Kingsdale.

Kingsdale is located near the Minnesota–Wisconsin state line. Nearby places in Minnesota include Cloverton, Markville, and Duxbury. Nearby places in Wisconsin include Dairyland, Moose Junction, and Cozy Corner.

Kingsdale is located 28 miles east of Askov; and 34 miles east-northeast of Sandstone. Kingsdale is five miles north of Cloverton; and nine miles west of Dairyland, Wisconsin.

A post office called Kingsdale was established in 1913, and remained in operation until 1961. Kingsdale had a depot on the Soo Railroad.
