= Markville, Minnesota =

Markville
- Unincorporated community
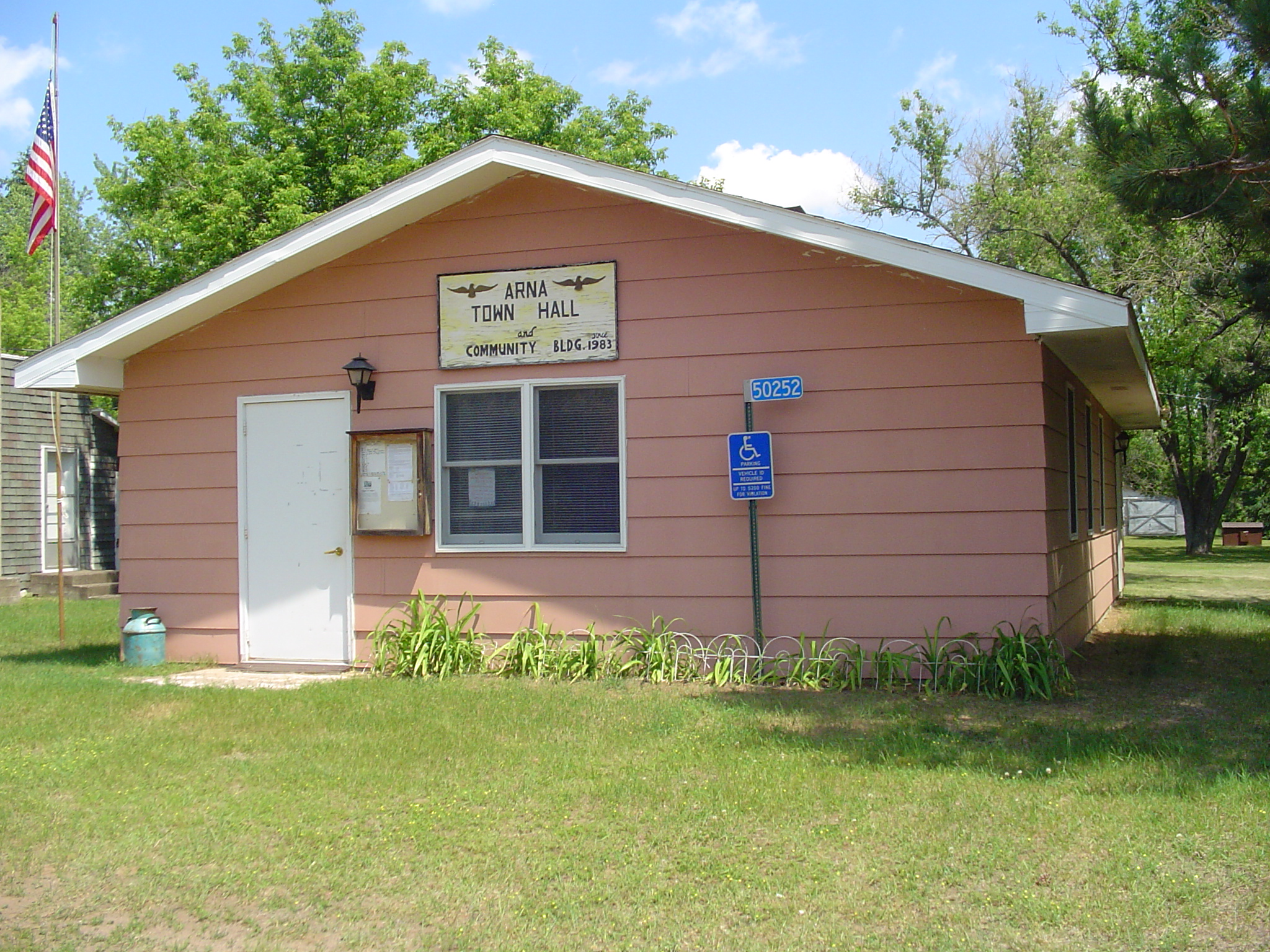
- Arna Township town hall and community building in Markville

- Location within Minnesota Location within the United States
- Coordinates: 46°05′31″N 92°19′51″W
- Country: United States
- State: Minnesota
- County: Pine
- Township: Arna Township
- Elevation: 1,001 ft (305 m)
- Time zone: UTC-6 (Central (CST))
  - Summer (DST): UTC-5 (CDT)
- ZIP code: 55072
- Area code: 320
- GNIS feature ID: 647545

Markville is an unincorporated community in Arna Township, Pine County, Minnesota, United States, located along the Saint Croix River.

The community is located east of Sandstone at the junction of Pine County Roads 31 and 25 (Markville Road).

Markville is located within ZIP code 55072, based in Sandstone. The Upper Tamarack River flows through the community. The Saint Croix State Forest is nearby. The Gandy Dancer Trail passes through Markville.

Markville is located near the Minnesota–Wisconsin state line. Nearby places in Minnesota include Cloverton, Kingsdale, and Duxbury. Nearby places in Wisconsin include Riverside, Cozy Corner, Dairyland, and Danbury.

Markville is located 28 miles east of Sandstone and 39 miles east-northeast of Hinckley.

A post office called Markville was established in 1912, and remained in operation until 1985. Markville had a depot on the Soo Railroad.
