= Tamarack (disambiguation) =

Tamarack is a common name for Larix laricina, a medium-size species of larch tree native to North America.

Tamarack may also refer to:

== Trees ==
- Tamarack pine, Pinus contorta var. murrayana, sometimes considered a subspecies

== Places ==
=== Canada ===
- Tamarack, Edmonton, Alberta
- Tamarack, Ontario

=== United States ===
- Tamarack, California, in Calaveras County
- Tamarack, Michigan, an unincorporated community in Gogebic County
- Tamarack City, Michigan, unincorporated community in Houghton County
- Tamarack, Minnesota, incorporated place in Aitkin County
- Tamarack, Wisconsin, unincorporated community
- Upper Tamarack River, Minnesota
- Lower Tamarack River, Minnesota
- Little Tamarack River, Minnesota
- Tamarack Lake, a lake in Minnesota
- Tamarack River (Minnesota)
- Tamarack River (Michigan)
- Tamarack Swamp, Pennsylvania

=== Recreational areas ===
- Camp Tamarack, California
- Camp Tamarack, Indiana
- Camp Tamarack, New Jersey
- Camp Tamarack (Oregon)
- Tamarack, Best of West Virginia, tourist attraction in Beckley, West Virginia
- Tamarack Flat Campground, campground in Yosemite National Park, California
- Tamarack Golf Club, Labrador City, Newfoundland and Labrador, Canada
- Tamarack Resort, all-season resort southwest of Donnelly in Valley County, Idaho
- Tamarack Ski Area (Troy, Idaho), defunct ski hill northwest of Troy in Latah County, Idaho

== Other uses ==
- Tamarack (band), Canadian folk group
- Tamarack Developments Corporation, home builder in the Ottawa-Carleon region of Canada
- Tamarack Microelectronics (1987–2002), Taiwan
- Tamarack mine, Calumet, Michigan
- Tamarack Peak, a mountain in Nevada
- Tamarack Review, Canadian literary magazine
- USS Tamarack (SP-561), a United States Navy patrol vessel in commission from 1917 to 1919

== See also ==
- Tamarac (disambiguation)
