= Duxbury, Minnesota =

Duxbury
- Unincorporated community
- Location within Minnesota Location within the United States
- Coordinates: 46°07′40″N 92°30′32″W
- Country: United States
- State: Minnesota
- County: Pine
- Township: Wilma Township
- Elevation: 1,063 ft (324 m)
- Time zone: UTC-6 (Central (CST))
  - Summer (DST): UTC-5 (CDT)
- ZIP code: 55072
- Area code: 320
- GNIS feature ID: 643002

Duxbury is an unincorporated community in Wilma Township, Pine County, Minnesota, United States.

The community is located east of Sandstone at the junction of Pine County Roads 24, 30, and 141 (Duxbury Road).

Nearby places include Askov, Sandstone, Bruno, Cloverton, and Markville.

Duxbury is located 17 miles east of Sandstone; and 18 miles southeast of Bruno. Duxbury is 28 miles east-northeast of Hinckley; and 15 miles northwest of Danbury, Wisconsin.

The Lower Tamarack River flows through the community. Duxbury is located within ZIP code 55072 based in Sandstone. The community is located on the edge of the St. Croix State Forest. The Nemadji State Forest is also nearby.

Local business establishments include the historic Duxbury Store, consisting of a general store and cafe. The Gandy Dancer Trail is also nearby.
