= Arna Township, Pine County, Minnesota =

Arna Township, Minnesota
- Township
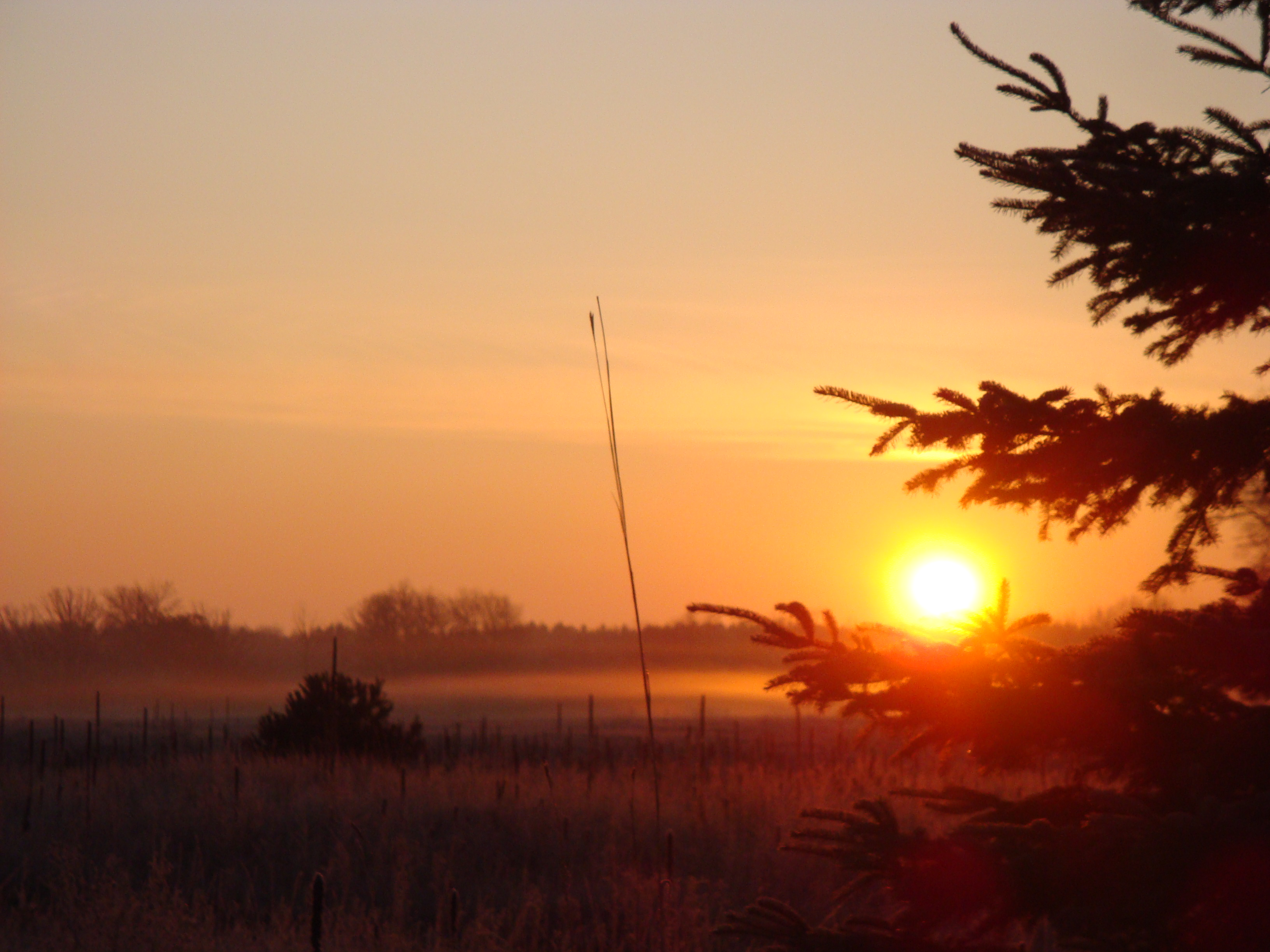
- A field in Arna Township at sunrise

- Location within the state of Minnesota Arna Township, Minnesota (the United States)
- Coordinates: 46°6′29″N 92°21′34″W
- Country: United States
- State: Minnesota
- County: Pine

Area
  - Total: 37.8 sq mi (98.0 km^{2})
  - Land: 37.6 sq mi (97.5 km^{2})
  - Water: 0.19 sq mi (0.5 km^{2})
- Elevation: 1,020 ft (311 m)

Population (2000)
  - Total: 86
  - Density: 2.3/sq mi (0.9/km^{2})
- Time zone: UTC-6 (Central (CST))
  - Summer (DST): UTC-5 (CDT)
- FIPS code: 27-02224
- GNIS feature ID: 0663459
- Website: https://arna.gov

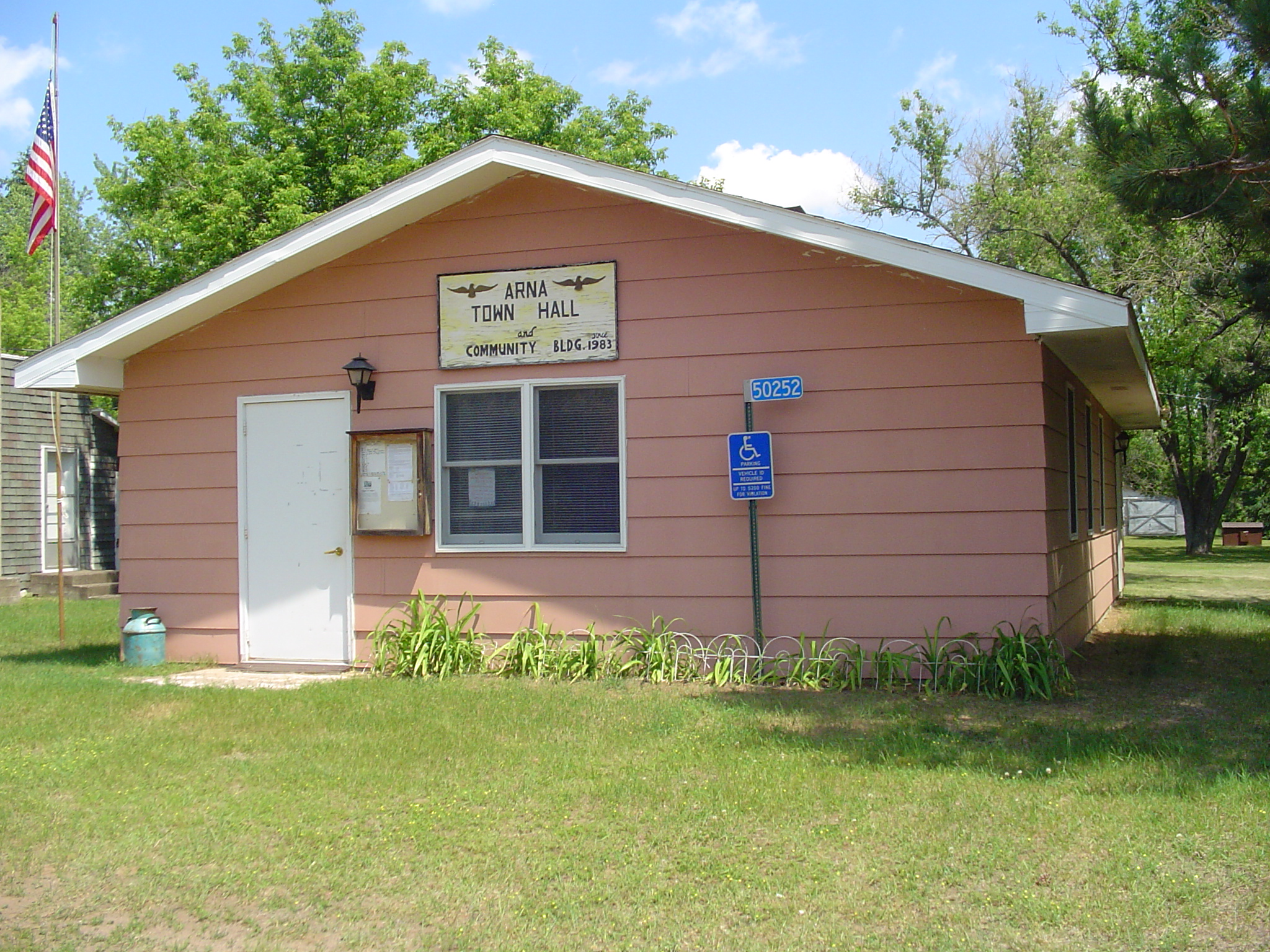
Arna Township's current town hall and community building, located in Markville

Arna Township is a township in Pine County, Minnesota, United States. The population was 86 at the 2000 census.

== History ==
Arna Township was founded on March 11, 1910. Its name was proposed by a county auditor by the name of W.H. Hamlin. Early settlers to the area were attracted by land sales and the lumber industry. In 1912 the Soo Line Railroad passed through Arna Township, and the community of Markville sprang up with the railroad. By 1920 the population of Arna had reached a peak of 350, but this number steadily decreased over the following decades. In 1981, the last train passed through Markville, and the railroad bed was subsequently dismantled and replaced by the Gandy Dancer Trail, which is currently used almost exclusively by All Terrain Vehicles and snowmobiles.

== Geography ==
According to the United States Census Bureau, the township has a total area of 37.8 square miles (98 km^{2}), of which 37.7 square miles (98 km^{2}) is land and 0.2 square miles (0.52 km^{2}) (0.45%) is water.

Located within Arna Township is the community of Markville, with a population of approximately 30 people.

Major bodies of water include the Saint Croix River; Hay Creek Flowage; the Upper Tamarack River; and the Lower Tamarack River.

The topography of the area is fairly level, but there are several low hills and ridges in the township.

== Demographics ==
As of the census of 2000, there were 86 people, 43 households, and 22 families residing in the township. The population density was 2.3 inhabitants per square mile (0.89/km^{2}). There were 194 housing units at an average density of 5.2 per square mile (2.0/km^{2}). The racial makeup of the township was 74.42% White, 1.16% African American, 17.44% Native American, 5.81% from other races, and 1.16% from two or more races. Hispanic or Latino of any race were 2.33% of the population.

There were 43 households, out of which 11.6% had children under the age of 18 living with them, 41.9% were married couples living together, 2.3% had a female householder with no husband present, and 48.8% were non-families. 34.9% of all households were made up of individuals, and 16.3% had someone living alone who was 65 years of age or older. The average household size was 2.00 and the average family size was 2.55.

In the township the population was spread out, with 12.8% under the age of 18, 8.1% from 18 to 24, 18.6% from 25 to 44, 38.4% from 45 to 64, and 22.1% who were 65 years of age or older. The median age was 50 years. For every 100 females, there were 126.3 males. For every 100 females age 18 and over, there were 120.6 males.

The median income for a household in the township was $30,875, and the median income for a family was $30,875. Males had a median income of $31,389 versus $28,500 for females. The per capita income for the township was $19,521. There were 8.6% of families and 10.3% of the population living below the poverty line, including 33.3% of under eighteens and none of those over 64.
