= Tamarack River =

The Tamarack River may refer to a water body in the United States:

- Tamarack River (Michigan), a tributary of the Middle Branch Ontonagon River in Iron and Gogebic counties on the Upper Peninsula of Michigan
- Tamarack River (Minnesota), a tributary of the Prairie River in Aitkin and Carlton counties on Minnesota
- Little Tamarack River, a tributary of the Tamarack River in Minnesota
- Lower Tamarack River, a tributary of the St. Croix River in Pine County, Minnesota
- Upper Tamarack River, a tributary of the St. Croix River in Pine County, Minnesota

== See also ==
- Tamarac River (disambiguation)
- Tamarack (disambiguation)
