= Camp Tamarack =

Camp Tamarack may be:

- Camp Tamarack, California
- Camp Tamarack, Indiana
- Camp Tamarack, New Jersey
- Camp Tamarack (Oregon)

== See also ==
- Tamarack (disambiguation)
