= Agnes Charbonneau =

American politician (1886–1961)

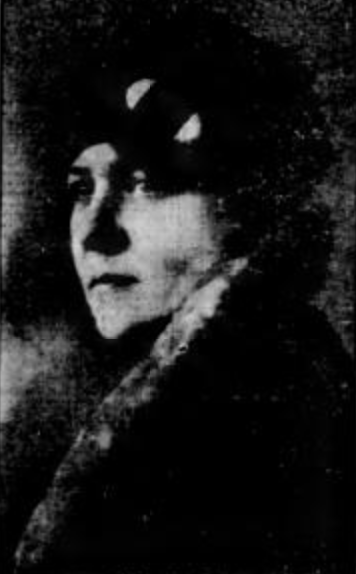
- Charbonneau, from a 1930 newspaper

Member of the Wisconsin State Assembly from the Douglas 1st district
- In office January 5, 1931 – January 2, 1933
- Preceded by: Roy L. Pinn
- Succeeded by: Maurice Weinberg

Personal details
- Born: Agnes Marie Carroll; October 4, 1886 Ironwood, Michigan, U.S.
- Died: March 20, 1961 (aged 74) Ventura, California, U.S.
- Resting place: Wisconsin
- Party: Republican
- Spouse: Emanuel Charbonneau (m. 1907; div. 1931)
- Children: Emanuel William Charbonneau; (b. 1911; died 1988)
- Occupation: Politician, clubwoman, educator, lecturer

Agnes Marie Carroll Charbonneau (October 4, 1886 – March 20, 1961) was an American educator and Republican politician. She was one of the earliest female members of the Wisconsin State Assembly, representing Douglas County, Wisconsin, during the 1931 term. She was also an active clubwoman in Superior, Wisconsin.

== Early life and education ==
Charbonneau was born in Ironwood, Michigan, the daughter of John M. Carroll and Margaret M. (née Rice) Carroll. She attended Bessemer High School and earned a bachelor's degree from Northwestern University in physical education and public speaking.

== Career ==
Charbonneau lived in Superior, Wisconsin, and was involved in club work and public affairs. She was a Republican, and defeated five men in the primary and the Progressive incumbent, Roy L. Pinn in the election, to win a seat in the Wisconsin state legislature in 1930. She was the only female legislator in the Wisconsin State Assembly when her term began in 1931. The League of Women Voters in Superior gave her a send-off luncheon as she prepared to move to Madison to serve her term. She rarely spoke on the floor; "she listens more and talks less than most of the men," according to a 1931 report. She spoke to women's club audiences about her work in government.

In 1933, Charbonneau gave radio addresses on national defense. She was president of the Superior Woman's Club in 1933 and 1934. In 1936, she directed and performed in an amateur musical comedy for the Superior Woman's Club. Later in life, she made ceramics and taught art classes in California.

== Personal life ==
Carroll married French Canadian physician Emanuel Charbonneau in 1907. They had a son, Emanuel William, and they divorced in 1931, just before she assumed her seat in the legislature. She moved to California in the 1940s, and died in 1961, at the age of 73, in Ventura, California.

Wisconsin State Assembly
Preceded by Roy L. Pinn	Member of the Wisconsin State Assembly from the Douglas 1st district January 5, 1931 – January 2, 1933	Succeeded by Maurice Weinberg
