= Tamarac River =

Tamarac River may refer to:

- Tamarac River (Red River of the North tributary), Minnesota, United States
- Tamarac River (Red Lake), Minnesota, United States
- Little Tamarac River, Minnesota, United States
- Tamarac River (Gatineau River tributary), Quebec, Canada

== See also ==
- Tamarack River (disambiguation)
- Tamarac (disambiguation)
