= Cloverdale, Minnesota =

Cloverdale
- Unincorporated community
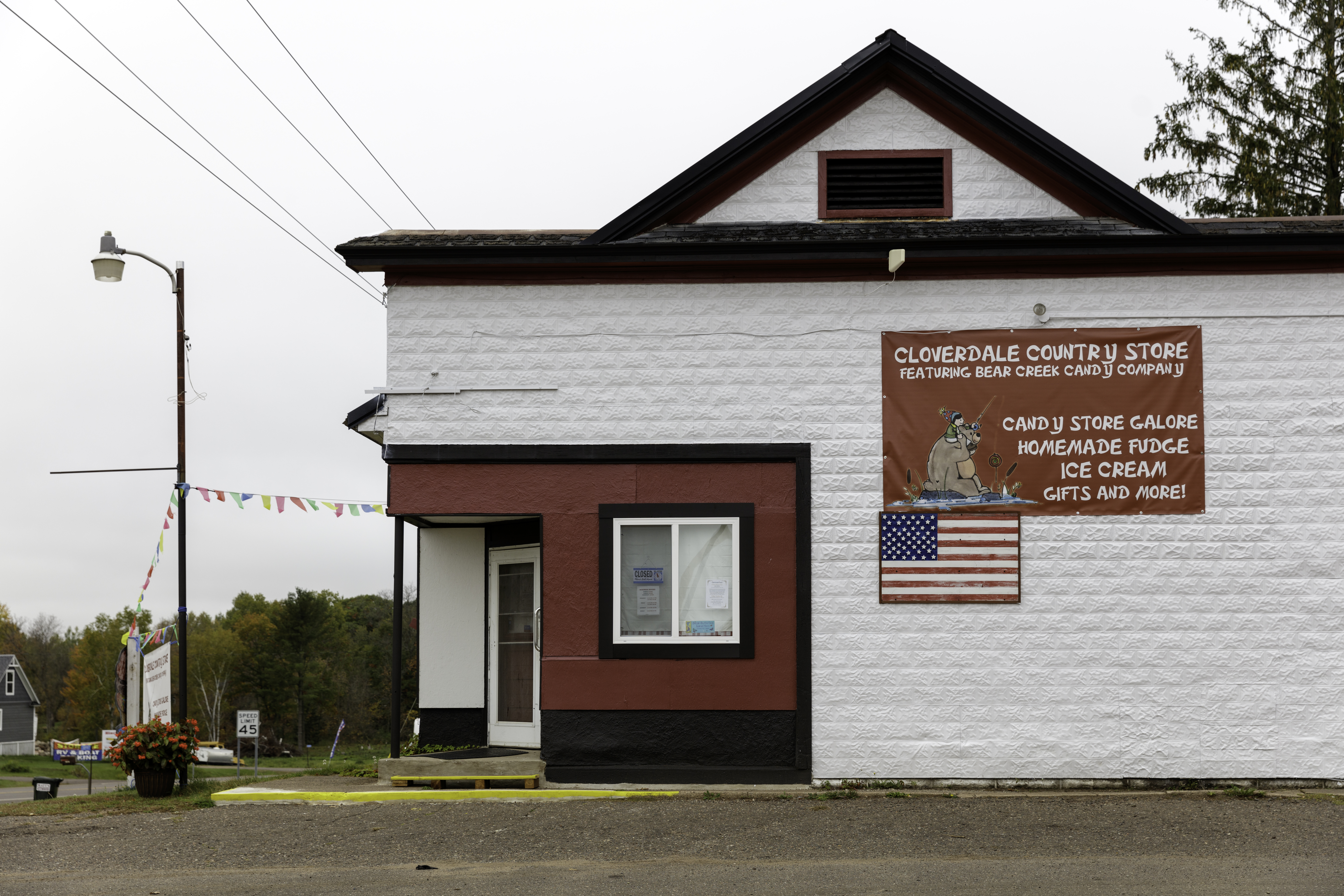
- Cloverdale Country Store

- Location within Minnesota Location within the United States
- Coordinates: 46°00′44″N 92°44′24″W
- Country: United States
- State: Minnesota
- County: Pine
- Township: Arlone Township
- Elevation: 978 ft (298 m)

Population
  - Total: 40
- Time zone: UTC-6 (Central (CST))
  - Summer (DST): UTC-5 (CDT)
- ZIP code: 55037
- Area code: 320
- GNIS feature ID: 641355

Cloverdale is an unincorporated community in Arlone Township, Pine County, Minnesota, United States.

State Highway 48 (MN 48) and Pine County Road 21 are two of the main routes in the community.

Cloverdale is located ten miles east of Hinckley; and 18 miles west of Danbury, Wisconsin.

Bear Creek flows through the community.

St. Croix State Park and St. Croix State Forest are immediately east of Cloverdale.

The community was originally known as Turpville.
