= L. C. Pedersen =

American politician

L. C. Pedersen (Lauritz C. Pedersen) (May 10, 1862 – February 16, 1929) was an American businessman and politician.

Born in Denmark, he moved to Minnesota and settled in Askov, Minnesota. He was in farming, livestock, and the dairy business, creamery, banking, hardware, and merchandise business in Askov, Minnesota and Pine City, Minnesota. Pedersen served in the Minnesota House of Representatives from 1919 to 1922. He died in Askov, Minnesota.
