= Banning, Minnesota =

Coordinates: 46°09′38″N 92°51′07″W

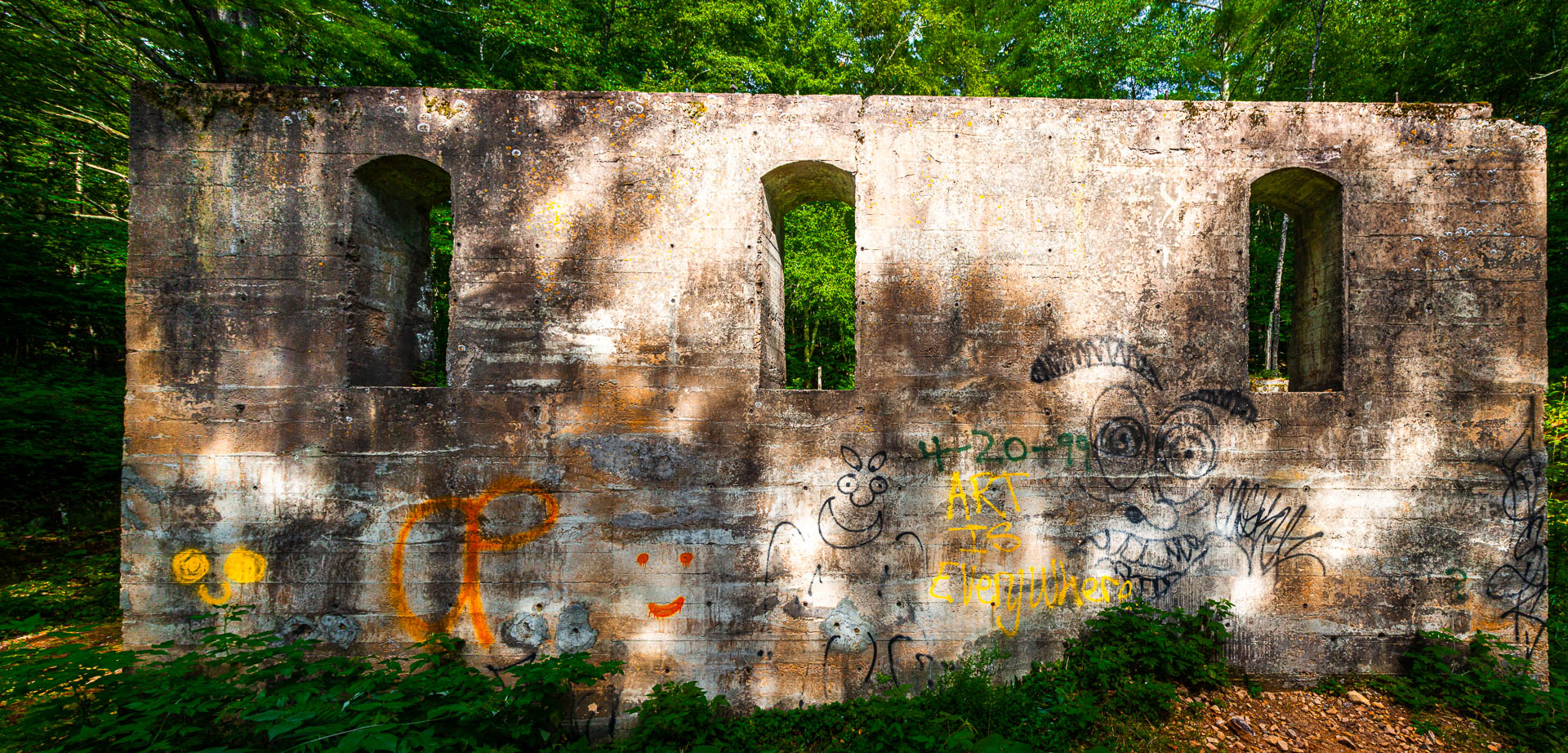
The Banning Quarry in 2019

Banning is a ghost town in Pine County, in the U.S. state of Minnesota. It is now a state park.

== History ==
A post office called Banning was established in 1896, and remained in operation until 1912. The community was named for William L. Banning, a railroad contractor and Democratic politician. It is now located in Banning State Park, which was established in 1963.

Historical population
Census	Pop.	Note	%±
1910	149		—
1920	44		−70.5%
U.S. Decennial Census
