= Finlayson station =

- Northern Pacific Depot
- U.S. National Register of Historic Places
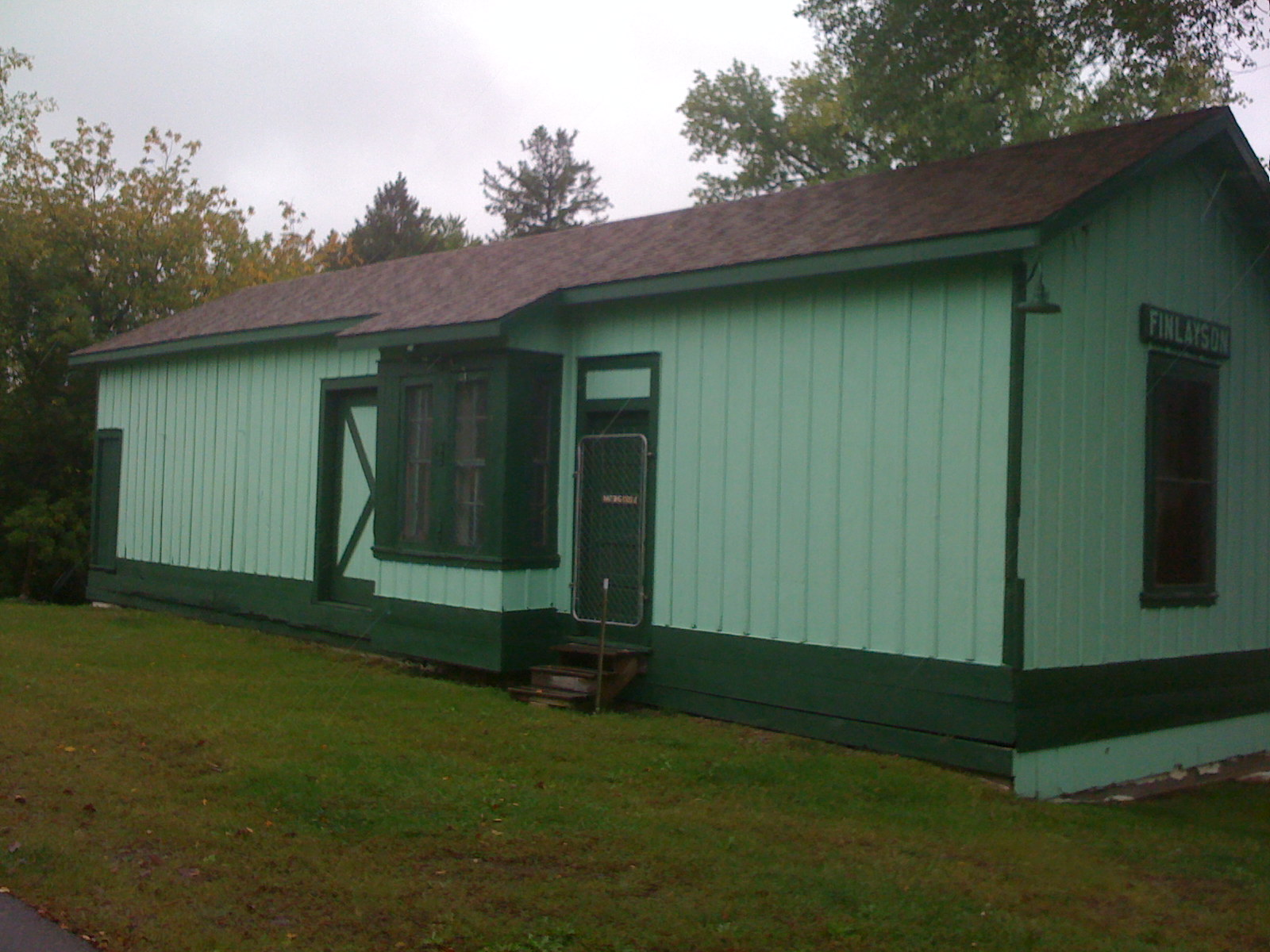
- Finlayson Depot (2008)

- Location within Minnesota Location within the United States
- Location: Front St. at Finland Ave., Finlayson, Minnesota
- Coordinates: 46°12′02″N 92°54′58″W
- Built: 1909
- NRHP reference No.: 80002107
- Added to NRHP: August 18, 1980

The Northern Pacific Depot in Finlayson, Minnesota, United States, is a one-story wood frame passenger depot built on the Northern Pacific Railway line in 1909 to replace an earlier smaller depot. The rail line was originally built by the Lake Superior and Mississippi Railroad in 1870. Its successor, the St. Paul and Duluth Railroad first located a depot in Finlayson in the mid 1880s. The line was acquired by the Northern Pacific Railway in 1900. In 1970, the line became part of Burlington Northern, which abandoned the line in 1977. Today, the former right-of-way is part of the Willard Munger State Trail.

The interior of the depot consists of a freight room at the southern end, the office at the center, and the waiting room at the northern end. The office's trackside bay window is flanked by a wide freight door to the south and a single-leafed five paneled passenger entrance to the north.

Finlayson depot lost passenger service on January 4, 1967.

Preceding station	Northern Pacific Railway	Following station
Groningen toward Minneapolis	Minneapolis – Duluth	Rutledge toward Duluth
