= Moose Junction, Wisconsin =

- Unincorporated community
- Location within Wisconsin Location within the United States
- Coordinates: 46°17′15″N 92°09′18″W
- Country: United States
- State: Wisconsin
- County: Douglas
- Town: Dairyland
- Elevation: 1,220 ft (370 m)
- Time zone: UTC-6 (Central (CST))
  - Summer (DST): UTC-5 (CDT)
- Area codes: 715 and 534
- GNIS feature ID: 1569710

Moose Junction is an unincorporated community in the town of Dairyland, Douglas County, Wisconsin, United States.

Wisconsin Highway 35 and County Road M are two of the main routes in the community.

The community is located 20 miles southwest of Solon Springs; 31 miles south of the city of Superior; and 25 miles northeast of Danbury.
