= Askov Finlayson =

Midwestern outfitter and Minneapolis-based fashion brand

- Industry: Apparel/Clothing/Fashion
- Founded: 2011; 15 years ago
- Founders: Andrew and Eric Dayton
- Defunct: 2023
- Headquarters: Minneapolis, Minnesota U.S.
- Products: Premium men's apparel and accessories
- Website: www.askovfinlayson.com

Askov Finlayson was a Minneapolis-based fashion brand and outfitter featuring primarily menswear, men's outdoor apparel, gear and accessories. Askov Finlayson was founded in 2011 by Eric and Andrew Dayton, grandsons of Bruce Dayton and sons of Minnesota governor Mark Dayton.

== Etymology ==
Askov Finlayson is derived from a combination of the names of two small towns, Askov and Finlayson, in east-central Minnesota who share a freeway exit on Interstate 35, Exit 195.

== History ==
In 2014, Askov Finlayson was named by Esquire to the list of "The 11 Best Men's Stores In America". In 2015, GQ named it among "The Top 10 Men's Stores in America".

In 2017-2018, as the company began shifting to making and selling its own outdoor gear, the company hired Adam Fetcher, a former Patagonia executive and spokesman for President Obama, to develop an innovative climate positive impact model – launched with the name "Give 110%" – in which the company would calculate the social cost of its global carbon footprint and donate 110% of that amount to support climate change solutions.

In January 2019, Askov Finlayson’s North Loop store closed, for the company to focus on its own product development and stop selling third-party brands. In November 2019, Askov Finlayson was relaunched as a direct-to-consumer outerwear brand, to eliminate the retail markup and undercut competitors on price.

A January 2025 article in Minnesota Star Tribune suggests that the brand is no longer active, as the Daytons have moved on to other environment-focused ventures.

== See also ==
- Belen Echandia
