= Finlayson, Minnesota =

City in Minnesota, United States

Finlayson
- City
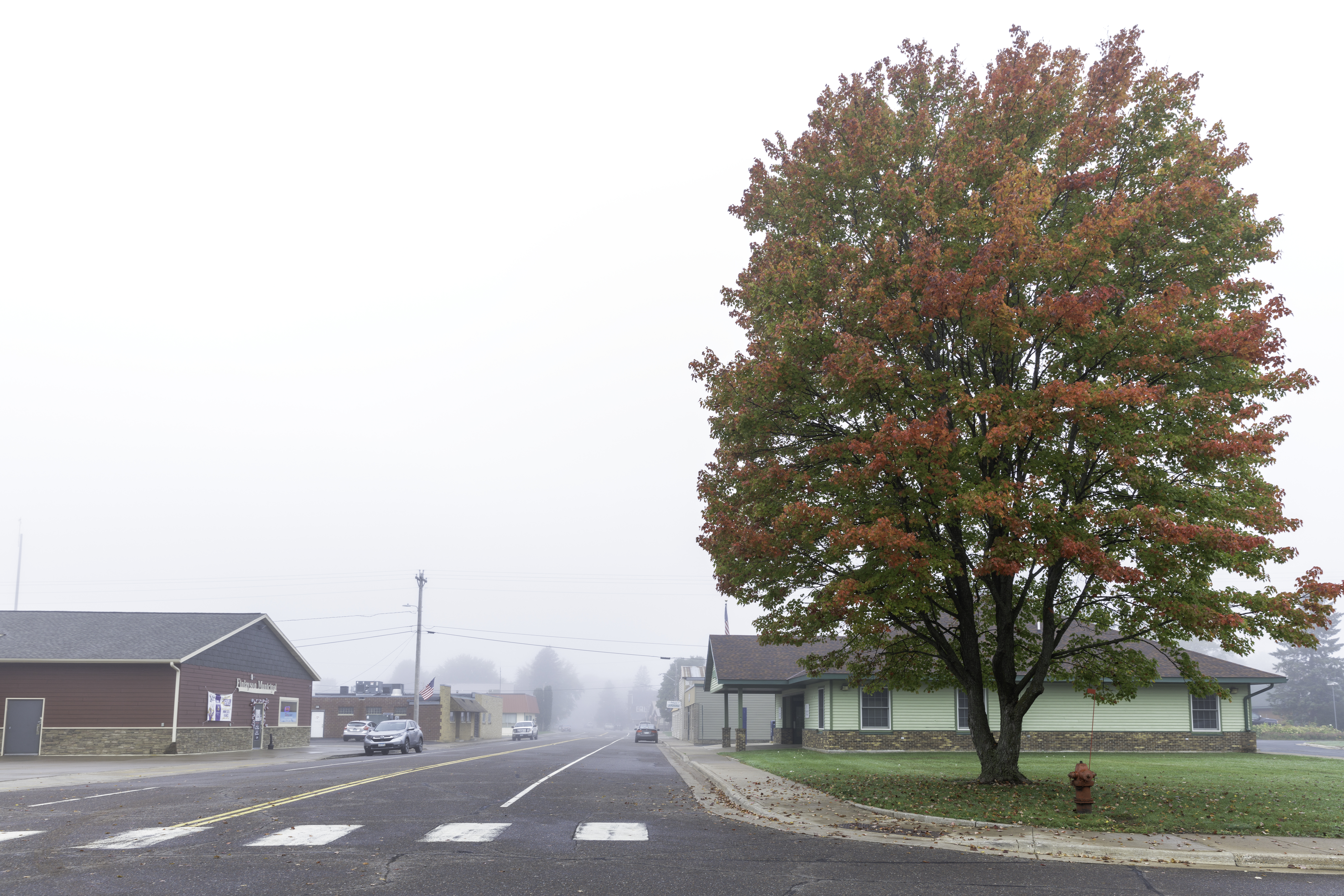
- Finland Avenue
- Nickname: Fintown
- Location of the city of Finlayson within Pine County, Minnesota
- Coordinates: 46°12′19″N 92°55′38″W
- Country: United States
- State: Minnesota
- County: Pine
- Incorporated: August 24, 1905

Government
  - Mayor: David Auchter

Area
  - Total: 2.51 sq mi (6.51 km^{2})
  - Land: 2.41 sq mi (6.24 km^{2})
  - Water: 0.10 sq mi (0.27 km^{2})
- Elevation: 1,099 ft (335 m)

Population (2020)
  - Total: 295
  - Density: 122.4/sq mi (47.27/km^{2})
  - Demonym: Finlaysonite
- Time zone: UTC-6 (Central (CST))
  - Summer (DST): UTC-5 (CDT)
- ZIP code: 55735
- Area code: 320
- FIPS code: 27-21122
- GNIS feature ID: 2394766
- Website: https://finlayson.gov/

Finlayson is a city in Pine County, Minnesota, United States. The population was 295 at the 2020 census. The city's area was incorporated from Finlayson Township, the remainder of which is still adjacent to it. https://finlayson.municipalimpact.com/

Interstate 35 and Minnesota State Highways 18 and 23 are three of the main routes in the area.

== Geography ==
According to the United States Census Bureau, the city has an area of 2.92 square miles (7.56 km^{2}), of which 2.79 square miles (7.23 km^{2}) is land and 0.13 square miles (0.34 km^{2}) is water. Its lakes include Fish Lake, Indian Lake, Big Pine Lake, Upper Little Pine Lake, Upper Big Pine Lake, and Rhine Lake. Finlayson is the halfway point between Forest Lake and Duluth. The cities surrounding Finlayson are Sandstone, Hinckley, Giese and Askov.

== Demographics ==
Historical population
| Census | Pop. | Note | %± |
|---|---|---|---|
| 1910 | 186 | | — |
| 1920 | 293 | | 57.5% |
| 1930 | 241 | | −17.7% |
| 1940 | 225 | | −6.6% |
| 1950 | 195 | | −13.3% |
| 1960 | 213 | | 9.2% |
| 1970 | 192 | | −9.9% |
| 1980 | 202 | | 5.2% |
| 1990 | 242 | | 19.8% |
| 2000 | 314 | | 29.8% |
| 2010 | 315 | | 0.3% |
| 2020 | 295 | | −6.3% |
U.S. Decennial Census

=== 2010 census ===
As of the census of 2010, there were 315 people, 134 households, and 78 families living in the city. The population density was 112.9 inhabitants per square mile (43.6/km^{2}). There were 145 housing units at an average density of 52.0 per square mile (20.1/km^{2}). The racial makeup of the city was 97.5% White, 1.0% African American, 0.6% Native American, and 1.0% from two or more races. Hispanic or Latino of any race were 1.3% of the population.

There were 134 households, of which 30.6% had children under the age of 18 living with them, 49.3% were married couples living together, 7.5% had a female householder with no husband present, 1.5% had a male householder with no wife present, and 41.8% were non-families. 35.8% of all households were made up of individuals, and 20.2% had someone living alone who was 65 years of age or older. The average household size was 2.35 and the average family size was 3.00.

The median age in the city was 45.1 years. 23.5% of residents were under the age of 18; 7.3% were between the ages of 18 and 24; 19% were from 25 to 44; 32% were from 45 to 64; and 18.1% were 65 years of age or older. The gender makeup of the city was 49.2% male and 50.8% female.

=== 2000 census ===
As of the census of 2000, there were 314 people, 132 households, and 76 families living in the city. The population density was 114.1 inhabitants per square mile (44.1/km^{2}). There were 136 housing units at an average density of 49.4 per square mile (19.1/km^{2}). The racial makeup of the city was 96.50% White, 0.64% African American, 0.32% Asian, 1.27% from other races, and 1.27% from two or more races. Hispanic or Latino of any race were 1.27% of the population.

There were 132 households, out of which 27.3% had children under the age of 18 living with them, 45.5% were married couples living together, 10.6% had a female householder with no husband present, and 42.4% were non-families. 40.2% of all households were made up of individuals, and 18.9% had someone living alone who was 65 years of age or older. The average household size was 2.38 and the average family size was 3.20.

In the city, the population was spread out, with 28.0% under the age of 18, 6.4% from 18 to 24, 30.6% from 25 to 44, 21.0% from 45 to 64, and 14.0% who were 65 years of age or older. The median age was 37 years. For every 100 females, there were 98.7 males. For every 100 females age 18 and over, there were 89.9 males.

The median income for a household in the city was $36,250, and the median income for a family was $46,875. Males had a median income of $35,313 versus $31,250 for females. The per capita income for the city was $16,818. About 3.4% of families and 8.2% of the population were below the poverty line, including 11.5% of those under age 18 and 15.9% of those age 65 or over.

== History ==
Finlayson Township, organized October 22, 1895, and the city in Finlayson and Pine Lake Townships were named in honor of David Finlayson, the former proprietor of a sawmill in this village. The city was incorporated as a village on August 24, 1905; it had a station of the Northern Pacific Railroad, a sawmill, a pickle factory, and two potato warehouses among its early businesses. The post office was established in 1887.

The fashion brand Askov Finlayson was named after this city and neighboring Askov, Minnesota, which share a freeway exit on I-35.

The Northern Pacific station still stands and is listed on the National Register of Historic Places.

== Government ==
Regular meetings of the Finlayson City Council are held at City Hall on the second Monday of each month at 6:30pm

== Education ==
Finlayson is served by the Hinckley-Finlayson Public Schools. The district was established in 1994 by consolidating the Hinckley and Finlayson districts.

East Central Schools has a Finlayson postal address, but its facilities are not in the Finlayson city limits, nor do they serve the Finlayson city limits.

Elementary school

Finlayson Elementary School is right off of Highway 18 and is referred to as "the School Growing in the Pines", being surrounded by pine trees. The school is dedicated to John W. Osborne, a former superintendent at the school. It hosts grades K-6 and provides preschool a few days a week. All classes have fewer than 20 students, making the enrollment around 80 for seven grades.

Due to budget cuts, the teacher to student ratio is approximately 1/14. In 2006, classes were combined; first and second, third and fourth, and fifth and sixth grades were taught together in one room by one teacher.

High school

The former Finlayson High School was torn down in 2004 due to instability. The last class to graduate was the class of 1990. Students who attend high school in Finlayson were moved to Hinckley High School to finish their education. Finlayson High School's colors were maroon and gold and the mascot was a falcon. Later, the high school in Hinckley changed its name to Hinckley-Finlayson High School. Hinckley changed its mascot from the Vulcans (red and silver) to the Jaguars (red, black, and silver) during this switch. Finlayson students make a 30-minute commute to Hinckley for high school. The average class size is between 50-80 students with around 400 students total. Finlayson students make up about 18% of the school.

== Annual celebrations ==
=== 4th of July ===
On July 3 and 4, Finlayson's main street is packed with food stands provided by local churches and community groups. There is live music and local performances. On the night of the 4th, people can camp in a large field to watch the county firework show.

=== St. Urho's Day ===
St. Urho's Day is the Finnish tradition of celebrating when St. Urho chased the crickets, and other vermin, out of Finland. Finlayson embraces its Finnish background by celebrating St. Urho's feast day on March 27. The city's fire department, elementary school, and community center are open to the public for a day of basketball, volleyball, and fried bread. The community center hosts a free pancake breakfast while the fire department hosts the fried bread.

=== Deer hunting ===
During deer season, Finlayson is packed with hunters. The city's land consists of many fields and swamp where deer are common. The Municipal hosts a gun raffle and a meat raffle during these weeks that attract outsiders to join the festivities.

== Gallery ==
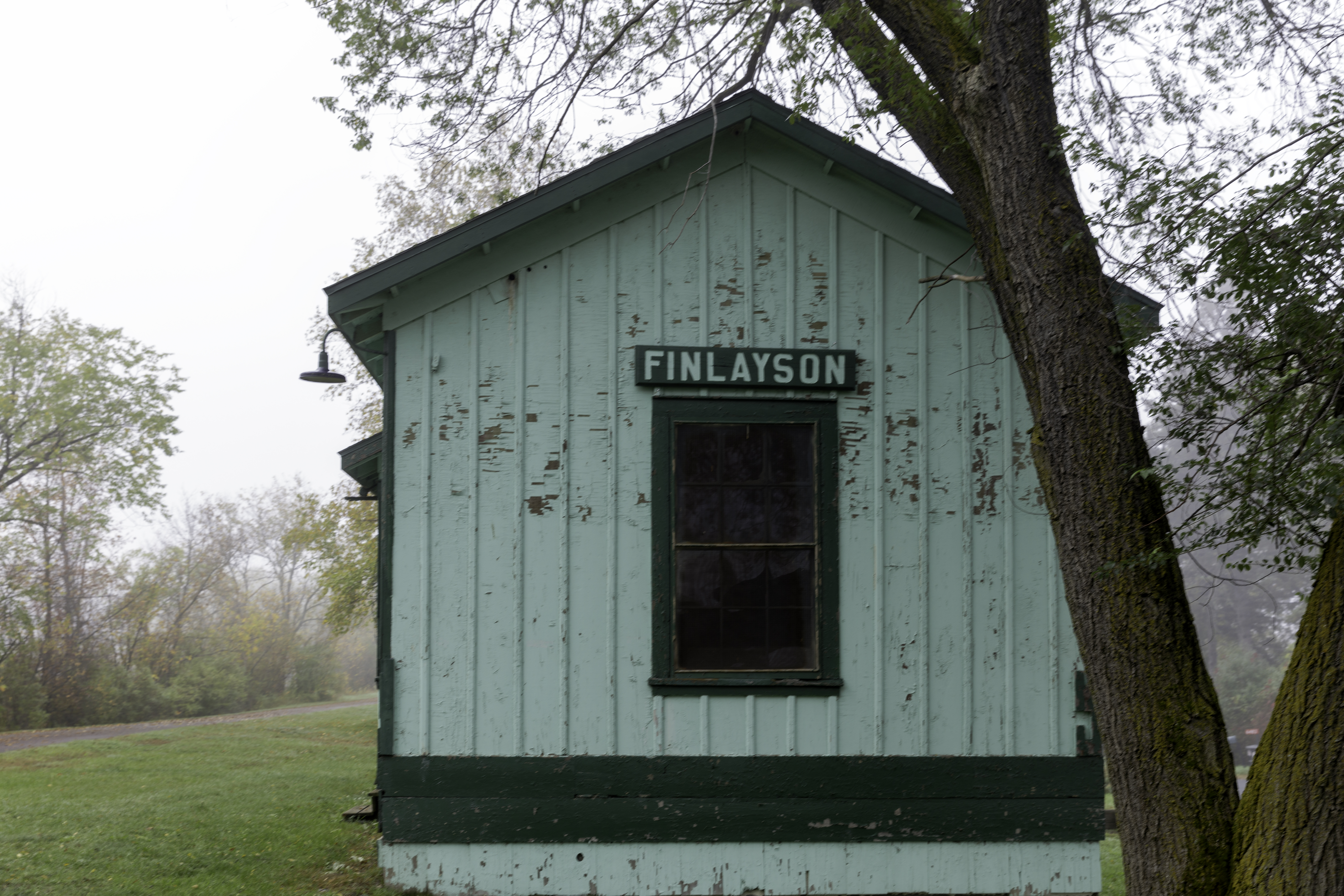
Northern Pacific Depot building

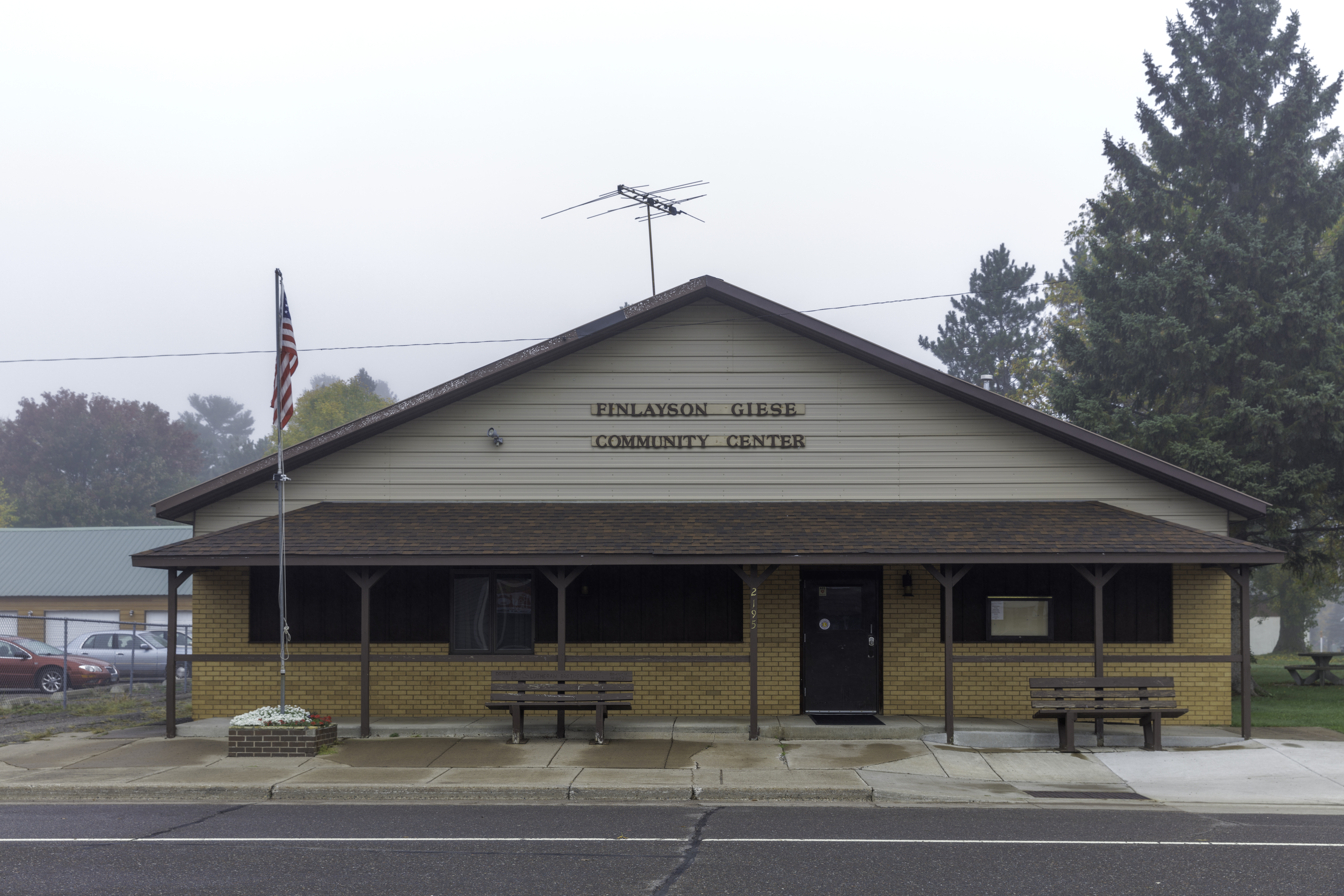
Finlayson Giese Community Center

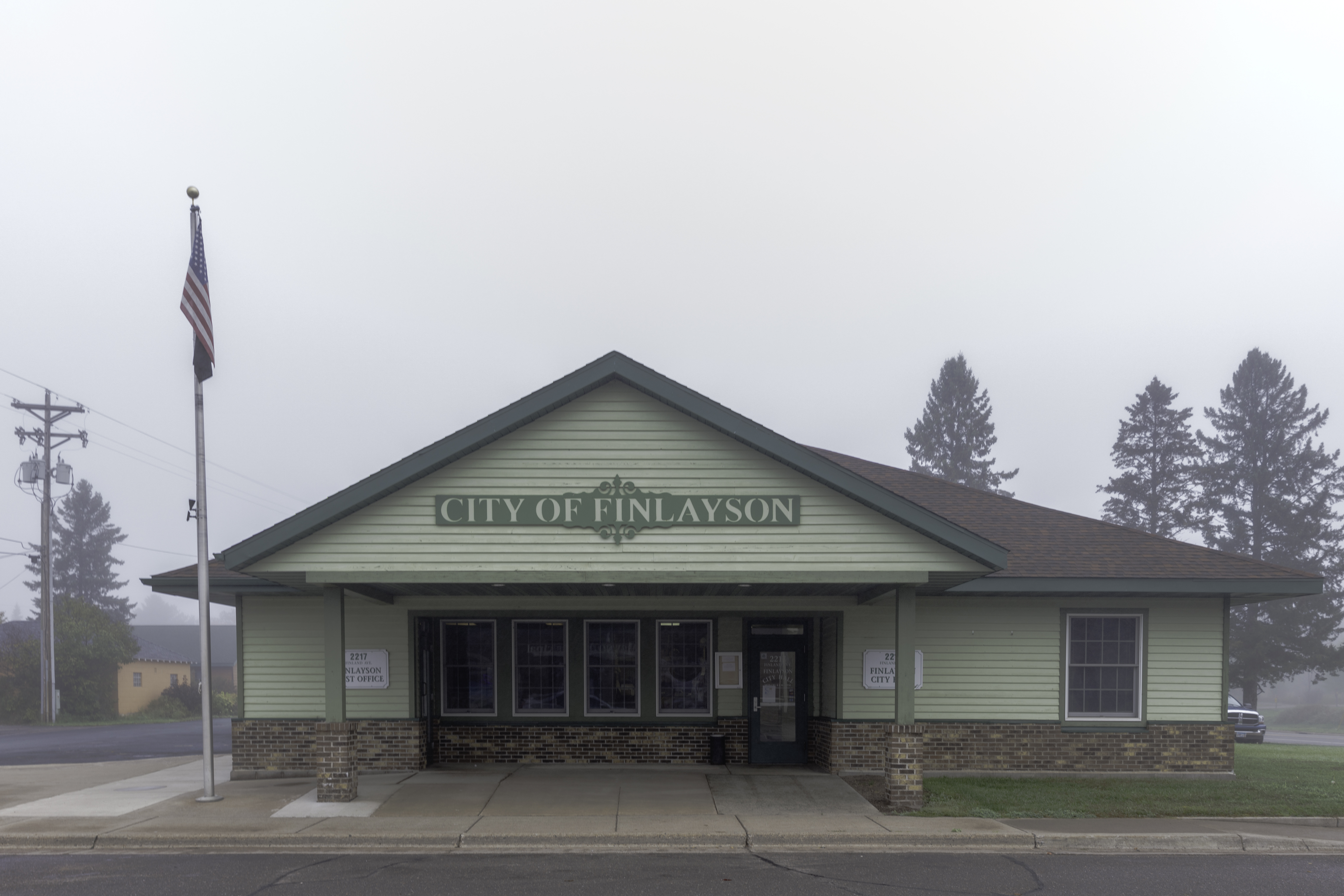
City of Finlayson building
