= Tamarac =

Tamarac may refer to:

== Settlements ==
- Tamarac, Florida
- Tamarac Township, Minnesota

== Wild areas in Minnesota ==
- Tamarac National Wildlife Refuge
  - Tamarac Wilderness, within the Refuge

== Rivers in Minnesota ==
- Tamarac River (Red River of the North)
- Tamarac River (Red Lake)
- Little Tamarac River

== Rivers of Quebec ==
- Tamarac River (Gatineau River tributary), a tributary of Pain de Sucre Lake, in Quebec, in Canada

== See also ==
- Tamarack (disambiguation)
