= Roy L. Pinn =

American carpenter and politician

Roy Lorin Pinn (May 9, 1888 – June 3, 1950) was an American carpenter and politician.

Born in Unique, Iowa, Pinn was a journeyman carpenter and was involved with the state executive council of carpenters. He served as clerk and director of the school district in the Town of Dairyland, Wisconsin, in Douglas County, Wisconsin. In 1929, Pinn served in the Wisconsin State Assembly on the Wisconsin Progressive Party ticket.
