= Banning State Park =

State park in Pine County, Minnesota

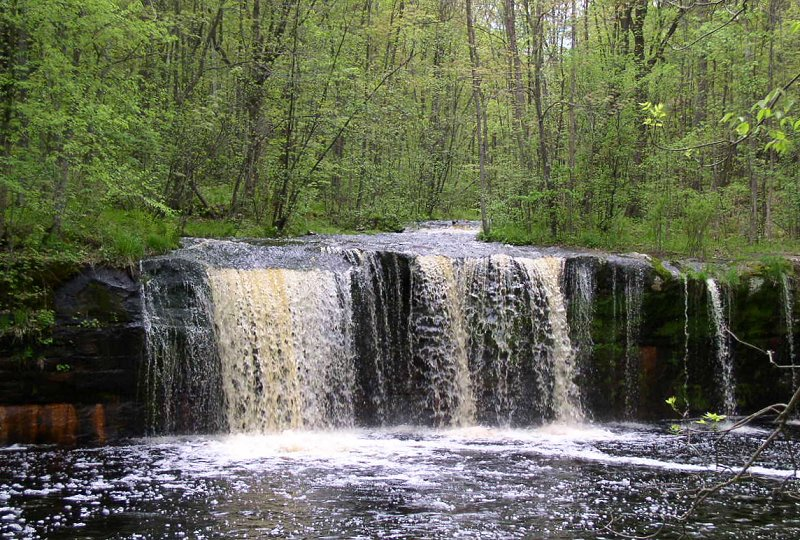
- Wolf Creek Falls

- Location within Minnesota Location within the United States
- Location: Pine County, Minnesota, United States
- Coordinates: 46°9′53″N 92°51′16″W
- Area: 6,237 acres (25.24 km^{2})
- Elevation: 1,122 ft (342 m)
- Established: 1963
- Governing body: Minnesota Department of Natural Resources

Banning State Park is a state park in Pine County, Minnesota, United States, stretched along 10 miles (16 km) of the Kettle River near the town of Sandstone. The centerpiece of the park is 1.5 miles (2.4 km) of churning rapids, some up to Class IV. The daring kayakers and canoeists who shoot Blueberry Slide, Mother's Delight, Dragon's Tooth, Little Banning, and Hell's Gate each spring attract spectators to the park. Landbound visitors can hike along the state's first Wild and Scenic River amid dramatic sandstone rock formations, large potholes carved by the river, and the remains of a historic quarry. Other features are Wolf Creek Falls and Robinson Ice Cave. The park is located directly off Interstate 35. Banning State Park is open daily from 8am until 10pm. Each vehicle entering the park requires an up-to-date permit which can be purchased online or at the park office.

== Natural history ==
=== Geology ===
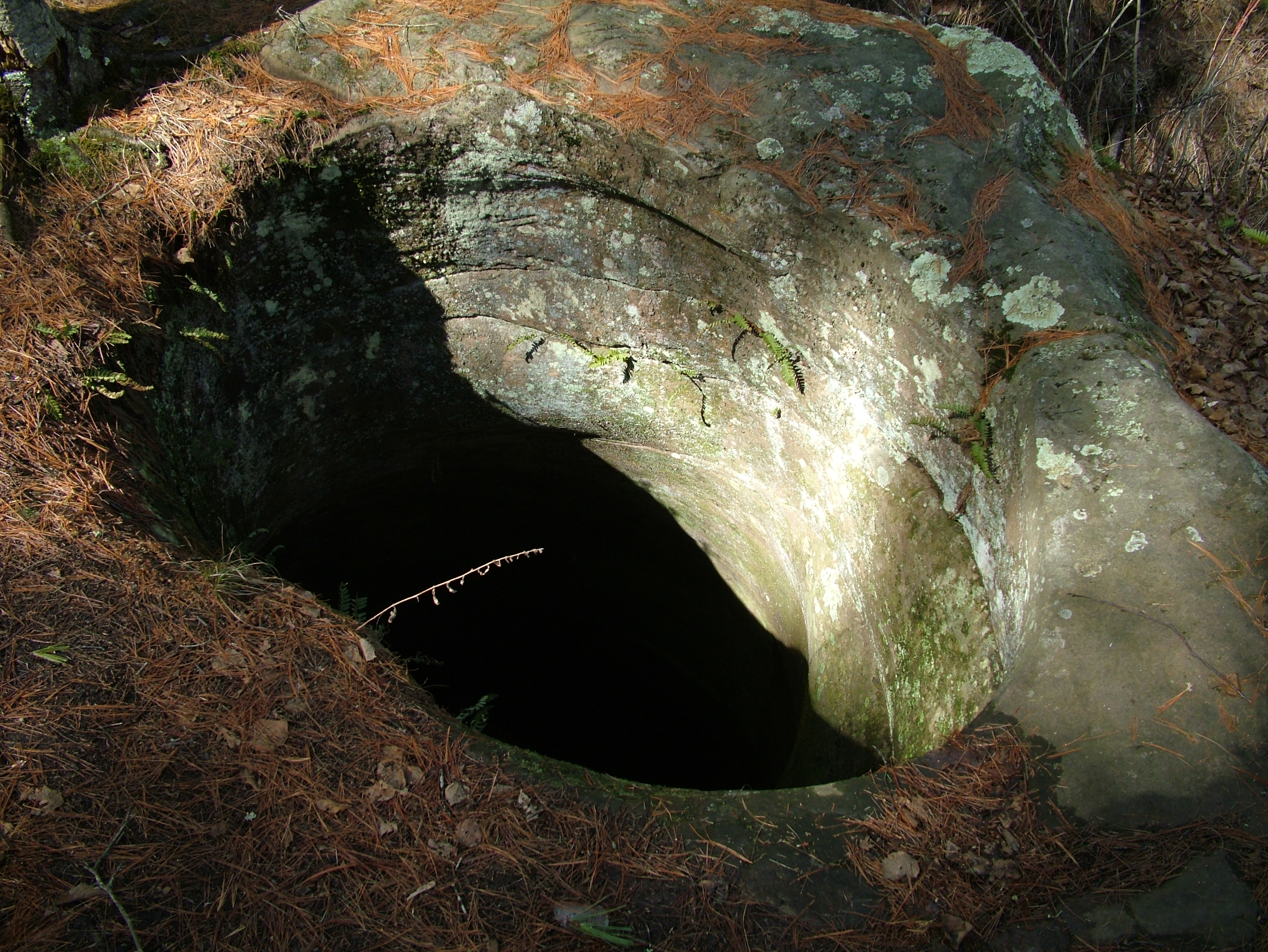
One of the many stone potholes carved out by the Kettle River

The park lies in a shallow, narrow valley worn by the Kettle River. The topsoil is very thin and in the center of the park the river has cut down through Precambrian sandstone known as the Hinckley Formation and on into the bedrock, resulting in a gorge—up to 40 feet (12 m) tall at Hell's Gate—and 1.5 miles (2.4 km) of rapids.

The park is also notable for its numerous glacial potholes, smooth shafts scoured into rock. These were formed at the end of the Wisconsin glaciation when the river was swollen by the melting ice, and powerful eddies sent debris swirling around and around, literally drilling shafts into the streambed. The Log Creek Arches in the northern section are potholes whose bottoms have been worn away on one side.

Robinson Ice Cave is a 200-foot (61 m) deep cave in the bluffs between Wolf Creek Falls and Sandstone. The cave is not open to the public and the entrance is gated to protect the little brown bats, big brown bats, and Keen's myotis bats that hibernate in it. In winter, large stalagmites of ice often form on the cave floor, but in a strict sense it is not an ice cave because the ice does not persist year-round.

Below the rapids, the valley once again begins to widen. Away from the river valley, the topography is generally level to gently-rolling glacial till plain.

=== Flora ===
The vegetation in this part of the Mille Lacs Uplands is still recovering from 19th century human industry and forest fires. The forest was logged, and around the quarry the ground was stripped bare. Today middle-successional species like birch and aspen are more prevalent than the Norway and eastern white pines that would have originally dominated the area.

=== Fauna ===
184 bird species have been sighted in Banning State Park, including ruffed grouse. Commonly spotted mammals include white-tailed deer, black bear, fox, coyote, raccoon, beaver, and snowshoe hare. 17 species of reptiles and amphibians and 34 species of mammals live in this park.

== Cultural history ==
Banning State Park

The durable, pink-colored sandstone exposed by the river was an ideal construction material, and in 1892 quarrying began after the St. Paul and Duluth Railroad laid a spur to the outcrop. The 1894 Great Hinckley Fire was a major setback, but quarrying bounced back quickly, and two years later a town arose just outside the quarry. It was named Banning after the president of the railroad, whose tracks allowed the stones to be shipped to St. Paul, Duluth, and beyond. The quarrying frenzy was over by 1905, a victim of local and national factors. Within the quarry most of the easily extractable high-quality sandstone was gone, and there was a nationwide architectural move away from stone to structural steel. An asphalt company lingered on until 1912, but when it closed so too did the town of Banning. The railroad company removed its tracks later that decade.

In 1959 the Pine County Historical Society interested the state in acquiring the Banning ghost town as a historical site. Given the obvious scenic value of the area, the proposal quickly evolved into a call for a new state park. A bill to this effect was ratified in 1963, although the state didn't acquire enough land to begin developing recreational facilities until 1967. An undeveloped northern section was added in 1986. In 1995 a dam at the southern tip of the park was removed, restoring a waterfall and another series of rapids. Ironically the remains of the town, which prompted the creation of the park, are no longer even visible.

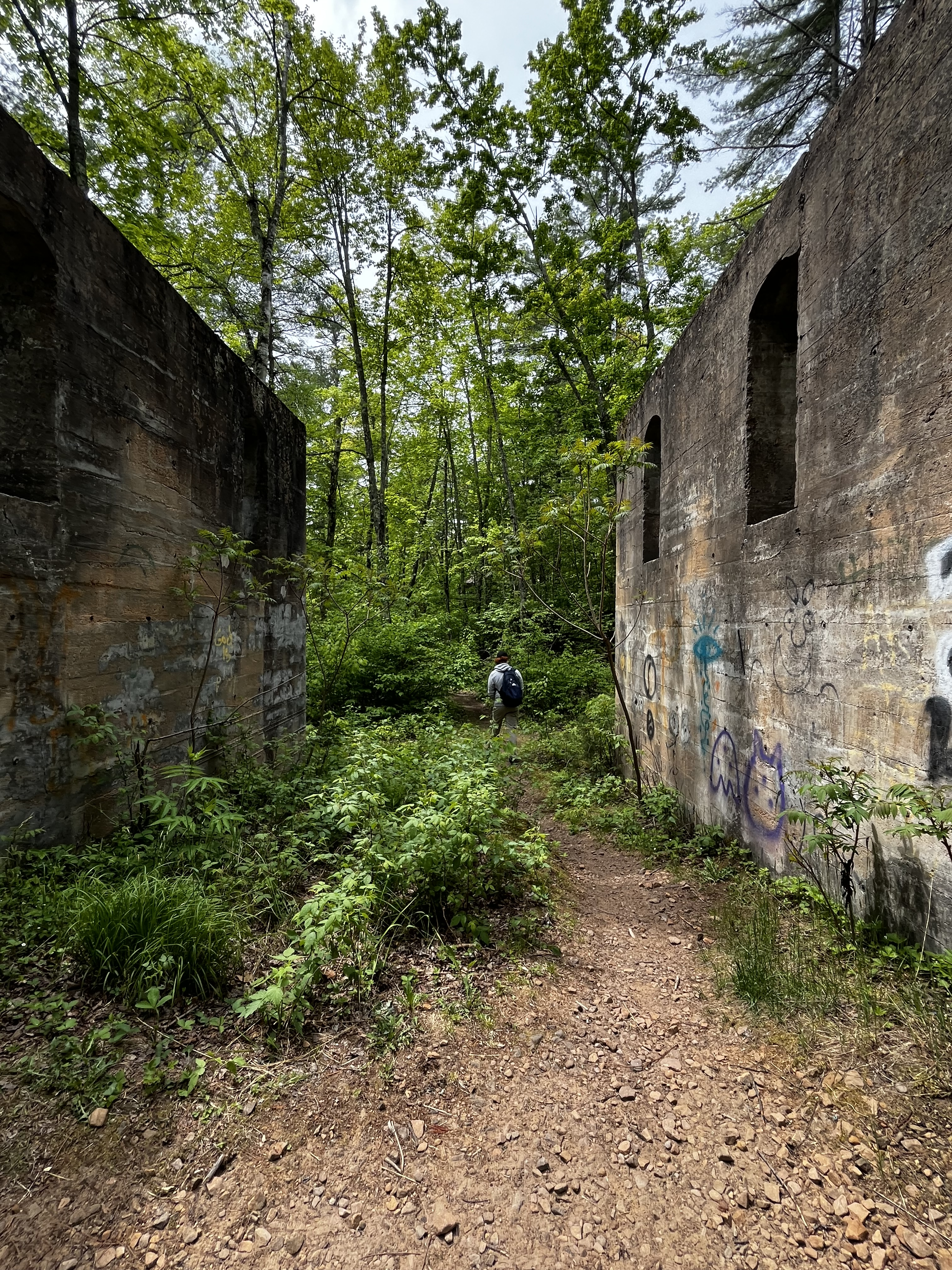
Walls in the Banning State Park of Pine County MN

== Recreation ==
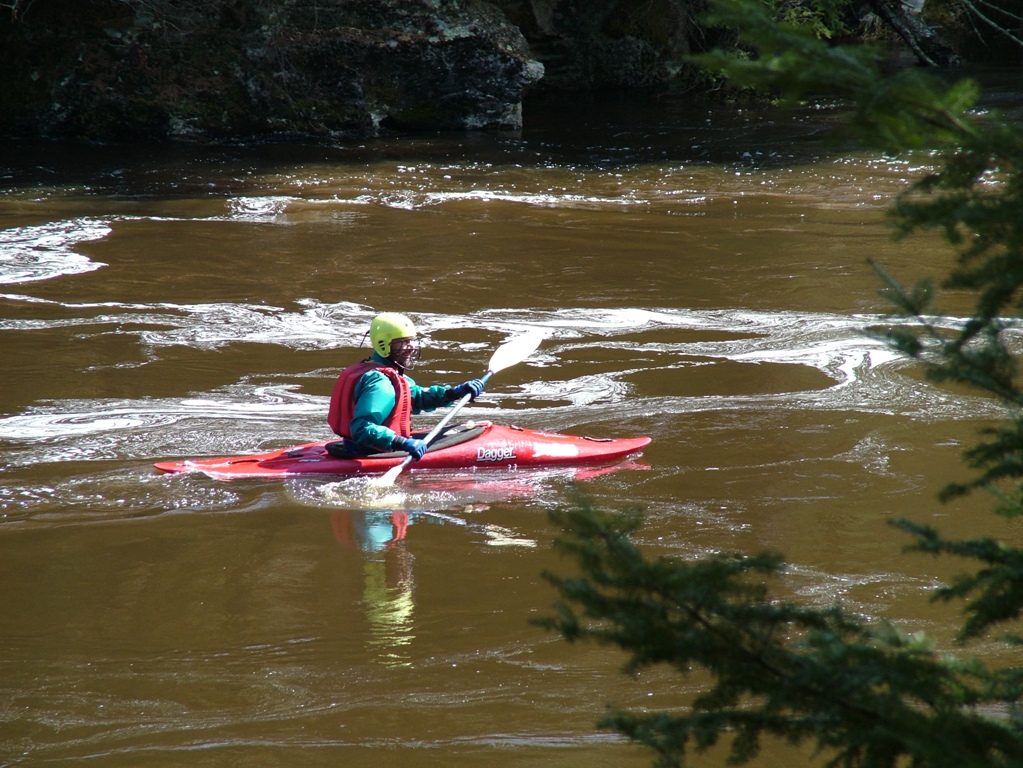
A kayaker on the Kettle River

The Kettle River is a destination for whitewater paddling including rafting, canoeing and kayaking. Within the park there are two carry-in access points and two boat ramps. Much of the river is Class I, with portages around the rapids. Fishing is also available along the Kettle River, which has held and produced state-record sturgeon.

Banning State Park's drive-in campground has 33 sites (11 with electrical hookups), a camper cabin, and showers. There are four canoe campsites spaced along the river. Banning State Park staff also manage a campground within nearby General C. C. Andrews State Forest that boasts 38 drive-in sites, 2 walk-in sites, and a group tent camp.

The park has 17 miles (27 km) of hiking trails. A paved bicycling path leads out of the park and connects with the Willard Munger State Trail. In winter 11 miles (18 km) of trail are groomed for cross-country skiing and 6 miles (9.7 km) are open for snowmobiling; snowshoeing is allowed anywhere in the park except for the groomed trails. Banning State Park hosts a number of bouldering locations for rock climbers. The boulders are listed in the guidebook Minnesota & Wisconsin bouldering.

== See also ==
- List of waterfalls
