= Partridge Township, Pine County, Minnesota =

Township in Minnesota, United States

Partridge Township
- Township
- Location within the state of Minnesota Partridge Township (the United States)
- Coordinates: 46°12′22″N 92°44′21″W
- Country: United States
- State: Minnesota
- County: Pine

Area
  - Total: 34.9 sq mi (90.4 km^{2})
  - Land: 34.9 sq mi (90.3 km^{2})
  - Water: 0.039 sq mi (0.1 km^{2})
- Elevation: 1,198 ft (365 m)

Population (2000)
  - Total: 518
  - Density: 15/sq mi (5.7/km^{2})
- Time zone: UTC-6 (Central (CST))
  - Summer (DST): UTC-5 (CDT)
- ZIP code: 55704
- Area code: 320
- FIPS code: 27-49876
- GNIS feature ID: 0665262
- Website: https://partridgetownship.com/

Partridge Township is a township in Pine County, Minnesota, United States. The population was 518 at the 2000 census.

Partridge bears the name of a pioneer settler.

== Geography ==
According to the United States Census Bureau, the township has a total area of 34.9 square miles (90.4 km^{2}), of which 34.9 square miles (90.3 km^{2}) is land and 0.04 square miles (0.1 km^{2}) (0.06%) is water.

== Demographics ==
At the 2000 census, there were 518 people, 191 households and 145 families residing in the township. The population density was 14.9 per square mile (5.7/km^{2}). There were 247 housing units at an average density of 7.1/sq mi (2.7/km^{2}). The racial makeup of the township was 96.72% White, 0.39% African American, 0.77% Native American, 0.77% from other races, and 1.35% from two or more races. Hispanic or Latino of any race were 1.16% of the population.

There were 191 households, of which 31.9% had children under the age of 18 living with them, 62.8% were married couples living together, 7.3% had a female householder with no husband present, and 23.6% were non-families. 17.3% of all households were made up of individuals, and 4.7% had someone living alone who was 65 years of age or older. The average household size was 2.71 and the average family size was 3.08.

27.6% of the population were under the age of 18, 6.9% from 18 to 24, 25.1% from 25 to 44, 26.6% from 45 to 64, and 13.7% who were 65 years of age or older. The median age was 40 years. For every 100 females, there were 98.5 males. For every 100 females age 18 and over, there were 92.3 males.

The median household income was $34,722 and the median family income was $40,313. Males had a median income of $31,042 versus $19,712 for females. The per capita income for the township was $23,262. About 4.3% of families and 4.7% of the population were below the poverty line, including none under the age of 18 and 5.4% of those 65 and older.

== In popular culture ==
The township shares a name with the fictional hometown of Adam Scott's character Ben Wyatt in the NBC sitcom Parks and Recreation. Scott's character Ben Wyatt was elected mayor at the age of 18. After he was elected he decided to fund a winter sports complex called Ice Town, which bankrupted the city and prompted his impeachment. The incident was documented in the local newspaper with the headline “Ice Town Costs Ice Clown His Town Crown.”
