= Arlone Township, Pine County, Minnesota =

Arlone Township, Minnesota
- Township
- Location within the state of Minnesota Arlone Township, Minnesota (the United States)
- Coordinates: 46°1′8″N 92°43′30″W
- Country: United States
- State: Minnesota
- County: Pine

Area
  - Total: 36.7 sq mi (95.0 km^{2})
  - Land: 36.6 sq mi (94.8 km^{2})
  - Water: 0.077 sq mi (0.2 km^{2})
- Elevation: 1,001 ft (305 m)

Population (2000)
  - Total: 345
  - Density: 9.3/sq mi (3.6/km^{2})
- Time zone: UTC-6 (Central (CST))
  - Summer (DST): UTC-5 (CDT)
- FIPS code: 27-02188
- GNIS feature ID: 0663458

Arlone Township is a township in Pine County, Minnesota, United States. The population was 345 at the 2000 census.

Arlone Township was organized in 1911, and named for Lois Arlone Hamlin, the daughter of a county official.

== Geography ==
According to the United States Census Bureau, the township has a total area of 36.7 square miles (95 km^{2}), of which 36.6 square miles (95 km^{2}) is land and 0.1 square miles (0.26 km^{2}) (0.25%) is water.

== Demographics ==
As of the census of 2000, there were 345 people, 132 households, and 93 families residing in the township. The population density was 9.4 people per square mile (3.6/km^{2}). There were 224 housing units at an average density of 6.1/sq mi (2.4/km^{2}). The racial makeup of the township was 95.94% White, 0.29% African American, 1.16% Native American, 0.29% Asian, and 2.32% from two or more races. Hispanic or Latino of any race were 0.87% of the population.

There were 132 households, out of which 35.6% had children under the age of 18 living with them, 59.8% were married couples living together, 4.5% had a female householder with no husband present, and 29.5% were non-families. 27.3% of all households were made up of individuals, and 5.3% had someone living alone who was 65 years of age or older. The average household size was 2.61 and the average family size was 3.17.

In the township the population was spread out, with 30.1% under the age of 18, 4.9% from 18 to 24, 29.3% from 25 to 44, 24.9% from 45 to 64, and 10.7% who were 65 years of age or older. The median age was 38 years. For every 100 females, there were 114.3 males. For every 100 females age 18 and over, there were 109.6 males.

The median income for a household in the township was $32,361, and the median income for a family was $39,531. Males had a median income of $27,917 versus $20,000 for females. The per capita income for the township was $14,867. About 5.0% of families and 6.7% of the population were below the poverty line, including 8.3% of those under age 18 and 5.6% of those age 65 or over.
