= Askov, Minnesota =

City in Minnesota, United States

Askov
- City
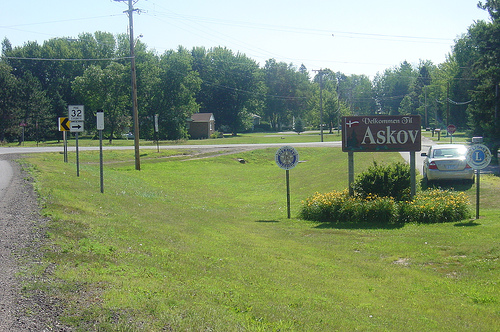
- Askov, Minnesota; July 2007

- Location of the city of Askov within Pine County, Minnesota
- Coordinates: 46°11′19″N 92°46′57″W
- Country: United States
- State: Minnesota
- County: Pine
- Incorporated: April 25, 1918

Government
  - Mayor: Paul Paulsen

Area
  - Total: 1.26 sq mi (3.26 km^{2})
  - Land: 1.26 sq mi (3.26 km^{2})
  - Water: 0 sq mi (0.00 km^{2})
- Elevation: 1,168 ft (356 m)

Population (2020)
  - Total: 331
  - Density: 263.2/sq mi (101.62/km^{2})
  - Demonym: Askovian
- Time zone: UTC-6 (Central (CST))
  - Summer (DST): UTC-5 (CDT)
- ZIP code: 55704
- Area code: 320
- FIPS code: 27-02548
- GNIS feature ID: 2394004
- Website: cityofaskov.com

Askov (/ˈæskoʊ/ ASS-koh) is a city in Pine County, Minnesota, United States. The population was 331 at the 2020 census.

Minnesota State Highway 23 serves as a main route in the community, and Interstate 35 is nearby.

== History ==
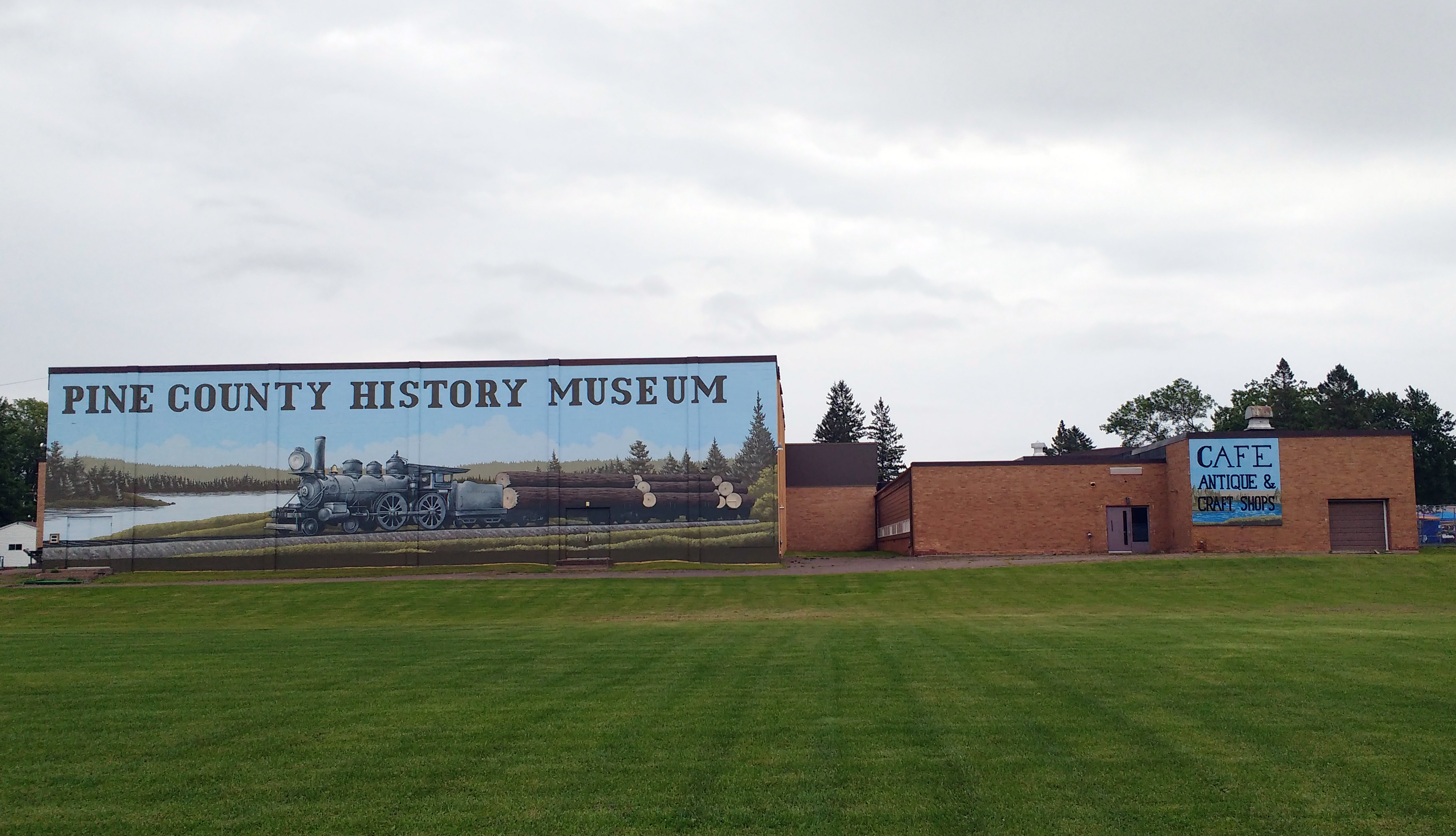
Pine County History Museum

The village was originally within the lands of the village of Partridge, at a stop far outside the original village along Great Northern Railway; here a post office was set up, called Partridge from 1889 to 1909, before changing its name to Askov in 1909. Most of the original village of Partridge was destroyed in the 1894 Hinckley fire. The immigrants to the Danish "colony" of Askov were nationalistic Lutheran followers of the theologian and cultural leader N. F. S. Grundtvig. Danish immigrants had previously been mostly economic migrants fleeing poverty, but the first migrants to Askov were almost all Grundvigian Danes from elsewhere in the U.S. The Dansk Folkesamfund (Danish Peoples Society) was founded in 1887 by Svend Hersleb Grundtvig, N. F. S. Grundtvig's son, to conserve Danish social heritage and promote immigration to the U.S. The Dansk Folkesamfund, with help from the railroad company, bought 45 parcels of land around the train station and post office in 1906 and by 1909 had sold them exclusively to Danish settlers, some 25 families. The name "Askov" was chosen to commemorate the village of Askov, Denmark, the site of one of the largest folk high schools (Askov Højskole) founded by N. F. S. Grundtvig. The name Askov is derived from "ash forest" (ask skov) in Danish. By 1916, almost 1,000 settlers of Danish descent lived here, although 1920 U.S. census data records only 242 inhabitants in Askov; most people lived in Partridge. This was Minnesota's largest concentration of Danish settlers. The new village was incorporated on April 25, 1918, and officially separated from the township as the City of Askov on April 8, 1921. Initially the main economic activity was dairy (the first cooperative creamery being built in 1910) supplemented by mixed intensive farming. Nearly all the streets in Askov have Danish names.

Askov's population now has the following ancestries: German (20.8%), Irish (12.0%), Norwegian (7.3%), Danish (6.3%), Scandinavian (5.2%), American (4.7%).

The fashion brand Askov Finlayson was named after this city and neighboring Finlayson, Minnesota, which share a freeway exit on I-35.

== Geography ==
According to the United States Census Bureau, the village has an area of 1.26 square miles (3.26 km^{2}), all land.

The Kettle River and Partridge Creek both flow nearby. Banning State Park is also nearby.

== Demographics ==
Historical population
Census	Pop.	Note	%±
1920	242		—
1930	298		23.1%
1940	312		4.7%
1950	387		24.0%
1960	331		−14.5%
1970	287		−13.3%
1980	350		22.0%
1990	343		−2.0%
2000	368		7.3%
2010	364		−1.1%
2020	331		−9.1%
U.S. Decennial Census

=== 2010 census ===
As of the census of 2010, there were 364 people, 171 households, and 88 families living in the village. The population density was 288.9 inhabitants per square mile (111.5/km^{2}). There were 188 housing units at an average density of 149.2 per square mile (57.6/km^{2}). The racial makeup of the village was 97.3% White, 0.3% Native American, 0.3% Asian, and 2.2% from two or more races. Hispanic or Latino of any race were 1.4% of the population.

There were 171 households, of which 24.0% had children under the age of 18 living with them, 36.8% were married couples living together, 8.8% had a female householder with no husband present, 5.8% had a male householder with no wife present, and 48.5% were non-families. 41.5% of all households were made up of individuals, and 21.7% had someone living alone who was 65 years of age or older. The average household size was 2.13 and the average family size was 2.88.

The median age in the village was 41 years. 21.7% of residents were under the age of 18; 5% were between the ages of 18 and 24; 28% were from 25 to 44; 25.5% were from 45 to 64; and 19.8% were 65 years of age or older. The gender makeup of the village was 47.0% male and 53.0% female.

=== 2000 census ===
As of the census of 2000, there were 368 people, 165 households, and 92 families living in the city. The population density was 288.3 inhabitants per square mile (111.3/km^{2}). There were 181 housing units at an average density of 141.8 per square mile (54.7/km^{2}). The racial makeup of the city was 95.92% White, 0.27% African American, 1.63% Native American, 0.54% Asian, 0.54% from other races, and 1.09% from two or more races.

There were 165 households, out of which 29.1% had children under the age of 18 living with them, 40.6% were married couples living together, 9.7% had a female householder with no husband present, and 44.2% were non-families. 40.0% of all households were made up of individuals, and 24.8% had someone living alone who was 65 years of age or older. The average household size was 2.23 and the average family size was 3.05.

In the city, the population was spread out, with 25.8% under the age of 18, 11.1% from 18 to 24, 22.0% from 25 to 44, 20.9% from 45 to 64, and 20.1% who were 65 years of age or older. The median age was 38 years. For every 100 females, there were 101.1 males. For every 100 females age 18 and over, there were 89.6 males.

The median income for a household in the city was $28,472, and the median income for a family was $36,250. Males had a median income of $27,375 versus $24,375 for females. The per capita income for the city was $14,583. About 5.3% of families and 9.2% of the population were below the poverty line, including 6.3% of those under age 18 and 16.7% of those age 65 or over.

== Tradition ==
Askov formerly called itself "rutabaga capital of the world" due to the large amount of rutabaga grown and exported by the town up until the 1970's. The village is now home to an annual "Fair and Rutabaga Festival", a beauty pageant and fair held during the fourth weekend of August, a few months before rutabaga is harvested.

== Education ==
The local school district is East Central Schools.

== Notable people ==
Askov is also the hometown of Minneapolis Lakers star and NBA Hall of Famer Vern Mikkelsen and was the residence of former Minnesota governor Hjalmar Petersen. L. C. Pedersen, businessman and politician, also lived in Askov.
