= Little Tamarack River =

Coordinates: 46.7368921°N 93.1054945°W

Location
- Country: United States

Physical characteristics
- Source
  - location: Minnesota

The Little Tamarack River is a tributary of the Tamarack River of Minnesota in the United States. After flowing into the Tamarack River, it flows into the Prairie River and then into the Big Sandy Lake.

== See also ==
- List of rivers of Minnesota
