= Tamarack, California =

Unincorporated community in California, United States

Tamarack
- Unincorporated community
- Location in California Tamarack (the United States)
- Coordinates: 38°26′20″N 120°04′34″W
- Country: United States
- State: California
- County: Calaveras
- Elevation: 6,913 ft (2,107 m)

Tamarack, formerly known as Camp Tamarack, is an unincorporated community in Calaveras County, California, United States. It was founded in the 1920s. A nearby weather station, located across the Alpine County line, has been the site of several United States meteorological records.

Tamarack is located at an elevation of 6,913 feet (2,107 m), on the west slope of the Sierra Nevada near Bear Valley and south of South Lake Tahoe.

== Climate ==
The Tamarack weather station was located at an elevation of 8,060 feet (2,460 m) ("upon the Summit" according to the first observer) and operated by PG&E employees from 1903 to 1948; its exact location is uncertain, but it is believed to have been located between Lower Blue Lake and Tamarack Lake, approximately 11 miles (18 km) southeast of Kirkwood Ski Resort. Here, the greatest snow depth ever recorded was measured at the Tamarack station: in January 1911, 390 inches (9,900 mm) of snow fell, leading to a snow depth in March of 451 inches (11,500 mm). Tamarack also holds the record for greatest seasonal snowfall in California: during the winter of 1906−1907, it received 883 or 884 inches (22,400 or 22,500 mm) of snow.

Tamarack has a subarctic climate (Köppen climate classification Dsc) with mild to warm summers coupled with chilly nights and moderately cold winter days with frigid nights and extremely heavy annual snowfall averaging 443.7 inches (11,270 mm).

Climate data for Tamarack, California
Month	Jan	Feb	Mar	Apr	May	Jun	Jul	Aug	Sep	Oct	Nov	Dec	Year
Record high °F (°C)	65 (18)	70 (21)	68 (20)	76 (24)	82 (28)	88 (31)	90 (32)	88 (31)	85 (29)	86 (30)	70 (21)	65 (18)	90 (32)
Mean daily maximum °F (°C)	38.4 (3.6)	40.4 (4.7)	44.2 (6.8)	49.2 (9.6)	55.9 (13.3)	63.2 (17.3)	72.5 (22.5)	72.5 (22.5)	65.1 (18.4)	55.0 (12.8)	44.9 (7.2)	39.1 (3.9)	53.4 (11.9)
Daily mean °F (°C)	24.9 (−3.9)	27.0 (−2.8)	30.3 (−0.9)	35.0 (1.7)	41.0 (5.0)	48.3 (9.1)	57.2 (14.0)	56.7 (13.7)	50.1 (10.1)	41.3 (5.2)	32.7 (0.4)	26.2 (−3.2)	39.2 (4.0)
Mean daily minimum °F (°C)	11.4 (−11.4)	13.6 (−10.2)	16.3 (−8.7)	20.7 (−6.3)	26.1 (−3.3)	33.3 (0.7)	41.9 (5.5)	40.9 (4.9)	35.0 (1.7)	27.6 (−2.4)	20.4 (−6.4)	13.2 (−10.4)	25.0 (−3.9)
Record low °F (°C)	−45 (−43)	−26 (−32)	−17 (−27)	−8 (−22)	0 (−18)	2 (−17)	24 (−4)	14 (−10)	14 (−10)	−1 (−18)	−12 (−24)	−26 (−32)	−45 (−43)
Average precipitation inches (mm)	8.88 (226)	8.47 (215)	8.06 (205)	3.10 (79)	2.34 (59)	1.47 (37)	0.76 (19)	0.43 (11)	1.17 (30)	2.46 (62)	4.81 (122)	6.45 (164)	52.78 (1,341)
Average snowfall inches (cm)	87.7 (223)	91.2 (232)	79.3 (201)	28.9 (73)	20.0 (51)	6.7 (17)	0.0 (0.0)	0.0 (0.0)	5.5 (14)	16.0 (41)	42.6 (108)	69.5 (177)	447.4 (1,137)
