= Tamarack River (Minnesota) =

Coordinates: 46°46′34″N 93°09′10″W

Location
- Country: United States

Physical characteristics
- Source
  - location: Minnesota

The Tamarack River is a river in Aitkin and Carlton counties, in the U.S. state of Minnesota. The river flows into the Prairie River, which then flows into the Big Sandy Lake.

Tamarack River was named from growth of tamarack along its banks.

== See also ==
- List of rivers of Minnesota
- Tamarack River (disambiguation)
