= Cozy Corner, Wisconsin =

- Unincorporated community
- Location within Wisconsin Location within the United States
- Coordinates: 46°09′53″N 92°14′17″W
- Country: United States
- State: Wisconsin
- County: Douglas
- Town: Dairyland
- Elevation: 1,060 ft (320 m)
- Time zone: UTC-6 (Central (CST))
  - Summer (DST): UTC-5 (CDT)
- Area codes: 715 and 534
- GNIS feature ID: 1563470

Cozy Corner is an unincorporated community in the town of Dairyland, Douglas County, Wisconsin, United States.

The community is located 33 miles southwest of Solon Springs; 42 miles south of the city of Superior, and 14 miles northeast of Danbury.

Wisconsin Highway 35 and County Road T are two of the main routes in the community.
