= New Dosey Township, Pine County, Minnesota =

New Dosey Township, Minnesota
- Township
- Location within the state of Minnesota New Dosey Township, Minnesota (the United States)
- Coordinates: 46°12′36″N 92°21′42″W
- Country: United States
- State: Minnesota
- County: Pine

Area
  - Total: 112.9 sq mi (292.4 km^{2})
  - Land: 112.8 sq mi (292.2 km^{2})
  - Water: 0.077 sq mi (0.2 km^{2})
- Elevation: 1,234 ft (376 m)

Population (2000)
  - Total: 74
  - Density: 0.78/sq mi (0.3/km^{2})
- Time zone: UTC-6 (Central (CST))
  - Summer (DST): UTC-5 (CDT)
- FIPS code: 27-45484
- GNIS feature ID: 0665092
- Website: https://newdoseytownship.com/

New Dosey Township is a township in Pine County, Minnesota, United States. The population was 74 at the 2000 census.

== Geography ==
According to the United States Census Bureau, the township has a total area of 112.9 square miles (292.4 km^{2}), of which 112.8 square miles (292.2 km^{2}) is land and 0.1 square mile (0.2 km^{2}) (0.07%) is water.

== History ==
Originally established as three separate townships of Dosey (organized 1909), Keene (organized 1920) and Belden (organized 1921), the three townships merged in 1949 to form New Dosey.

== Demographics ==
As of the census of 2000, there were 74 people, 38 households, and 22 families residing in the township. The population density was 0.7 people per square mile (0.3/km^{2}). There were 212 housing units at an average density of 1.9/sq mi (0.7/km^{2}). The racial makeup of the township was 91.89% White, 1.35% Native American, 2.70% Asian, 2.70% from other races, and 1.35% from two or more races. Hispanic or Latino of any race were 2.70% of the population.

There were 38 households, out of which 13.2% had children under the age of 18 living with them, 55.3% were married couples living together, 5.3% had a female householder with no husband present, and 39.5% were non-families. 34.2% of all households were made up of individuals, and 18.4% had someone living alone who was 65 years of age or older. The average household size was 1.95 and the average family size was 2.43.

In the township the population was spread out, with 14.9% under the age of 18, 2.7% from 18 to 24, 12.2% from 25 to 44, 39.2% from 45 to 64, and 31.1% who were 65 years of age or older. The median age was 56 years. For every 100 females, there were 89.7 males. For every 100 females age 18 and over, there were 75.0 males.

The median income for a household in the township was $24,500, and the median income for a family was $55,625. Males had a median income of $0 versus $29,167 for females. The per capita income for the township was $24,298. There were no families and 7.1% of the population living below the poverty line, including no under eighteens and 25.0% of those over 64.
