= Dairyland, Wisconsin =

Dairyland
- Town
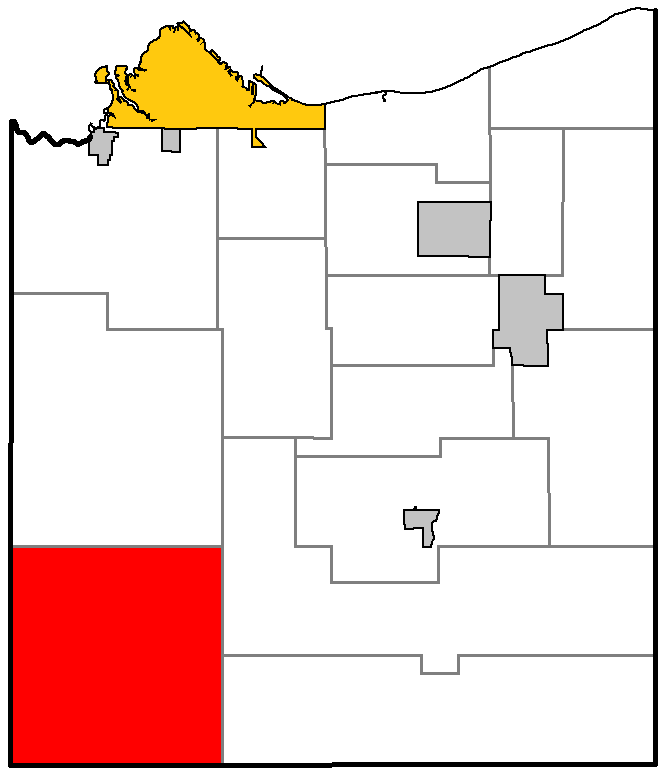
- Location of Dairyland, within Douglas County
- Coordinates: 46°13′47″N 92°11′2″W
- Country: United States
- State: Wisconsin
- County: Douglas

Area
  - Total: 140.8 sq mi (364.7 km^{2})
  - Land: 140.2 sq mi (363.1 km^{2})
  - Water: 0.62 sq mi (1.6 km^{2})
- Elevation: 1,168 ft (356 m)

Population (2020)
  - Total: 211
  - Density: 1.51/sq mi (0.581/km^{2})
- Time zone: UTC-6 (Central (CST))
  - Summer (DST): UTC-5 (CDT)
- Area codes: 715 and 534
- FIPS code: 55-18425
- GNIS feature ID: 1583042
- Website: http://townofdairyland.com/

Dairyland is a town in Douglas County, Wisconsin, United States. The population was 211 at the 2020 census. The unincorporated communities of Cozy Corner, Dairyland, and Moose Junction are located in the town.

== Transportation ==
Wisconsin Highway 35 and County Roads M and T are main routes in the town.

== Geography ==
According to the United States Census Bureau, the town has a total area of 140.8 square miles (364.7 km^{2}), of which 140.2 square miles (363.1 km^{2}) is land and 0.6 square miles (1.6 km^{2}) (0.43%) is water.

== Demographics ==
At the 2000 census, there were 186 people, 87 households and 56 families residing in the town. The population density was 1.3 per square mile (0.5/km^{2}). There were 139 housing units at an average density of 1.0 per square mile (0.4/km^{2}). The racial makeup of the town was 97.31% White, 0.54% Native American, and 2.15% from two or more races.

There were 87 households, of which 13.8% had children under the age of 18 living with them, 54.0% were married couples living together, 6.9% had a female householder with no husband present, and 35.6% were non-families. 31.0% of all households were made up of individuals, and 12.6% had someone living alone who was 65 years of age or older. The average household size was 2.14 and the average family size was 2.59.

13.4% of the population were under the age of 18, 4.3% from 18 to 24, 22.6% from 25 to 44, 40.9% from 45 to 64, and 18.8% who were 65 years of age or older. The median age was 48 years. For every 100 females, there were 116.3 males. For every 100 females age 18 and over, there were 120.5 males.

The median household income was $35,313 and the median income for a family was $48,333. Males had a median income of $27,917 and females $22,083. The per capita income was $18,155. About 7.6% of families and 9.0% of the population were below the poverty line, including none of those under the age of eighteen and 14.3% of those 65 or over.

As of the latest U.S. Census Bureau estimates done in 2020, the population of the Town of Dairyland in Douglas County, Wisconsin is approximately 215 people, with a median age of about 62 years according to 2023 American Community Survey data. The town has around 115 households, and the estimated median household income is approximately $55,417.

== Notable people ==
- Roy L. Pinn, Wisconsin State Representative
