= Lower Tamarack River =

- Mouth of the Lower Tamarack River

Location
- Country: United States
- State: Minnesota
- County: Pine

Physical characteristics
- Source
  - coordinates: 46.3154989°N 92.4288065°W
- Mouth
  - coordinates: 46.0274455°N 92.4193612°W
- Length: 39.0 mi-long (62.8 km)

Basin features
- Progression: Lower Tamarack→ St. Croix River→ Mississippi River→ Gulf of Mexico
- River system: St. Croix River

The Lower Tamarack River is a 39.0-mile-long (62.8 km) river in Pine County near the eastern border of Minnesota, in the United States. It is a tributary of the St. Croix River, which flows southwards to the Mississippi River.

The Upper Tamarack River is a separate stream also flowing into the St. Croix River several miles upstream from the mouth of the Lower Tamarack River.

== See also ==
- List of rivers of Minnesota
- List of longest streams of Minnesota
- Tamarack River (disambiguation)
