= Upper Tamarack River =

- Mouth of the Upper Tamarack River

Location
- Country: United States
- States: Wisconsin, Minnesota
- Counties: Douglas County, Wisconsin, Pine County, Minnesota

Physical characteristics
- Source
  - location: Empire Swamp, Douglas County, Wisconsin
  - coordinates: 46.3332747°N 92.0863024°W
- Mouth
  - location: Pine County, Minnesota, Danbury East
  - coordinates: 46°04′13″N 92°19′09″W
  - elevation: 886 feet (270 meters)
- Length: 31 mi-long (50 km)

Basin features
- River system: St. Croix River

The Upper Tamarack River is a 31.0-mile-long (49.9 km) tributary of the St. Croix River in Wisconsin and Minnesota, United States. The Lower Tamarack River is a separate stream also flowing into the St. Croix River several miles downstream from the mouth of the Upper Tamarack River.

== See also ==
- List of rivers of Minnesota
- List of longest streams of Minnesota
- List of rivers of Wisconsin
- Tamarack River (disambiguation)
