= Gandy Dancer State Trail =

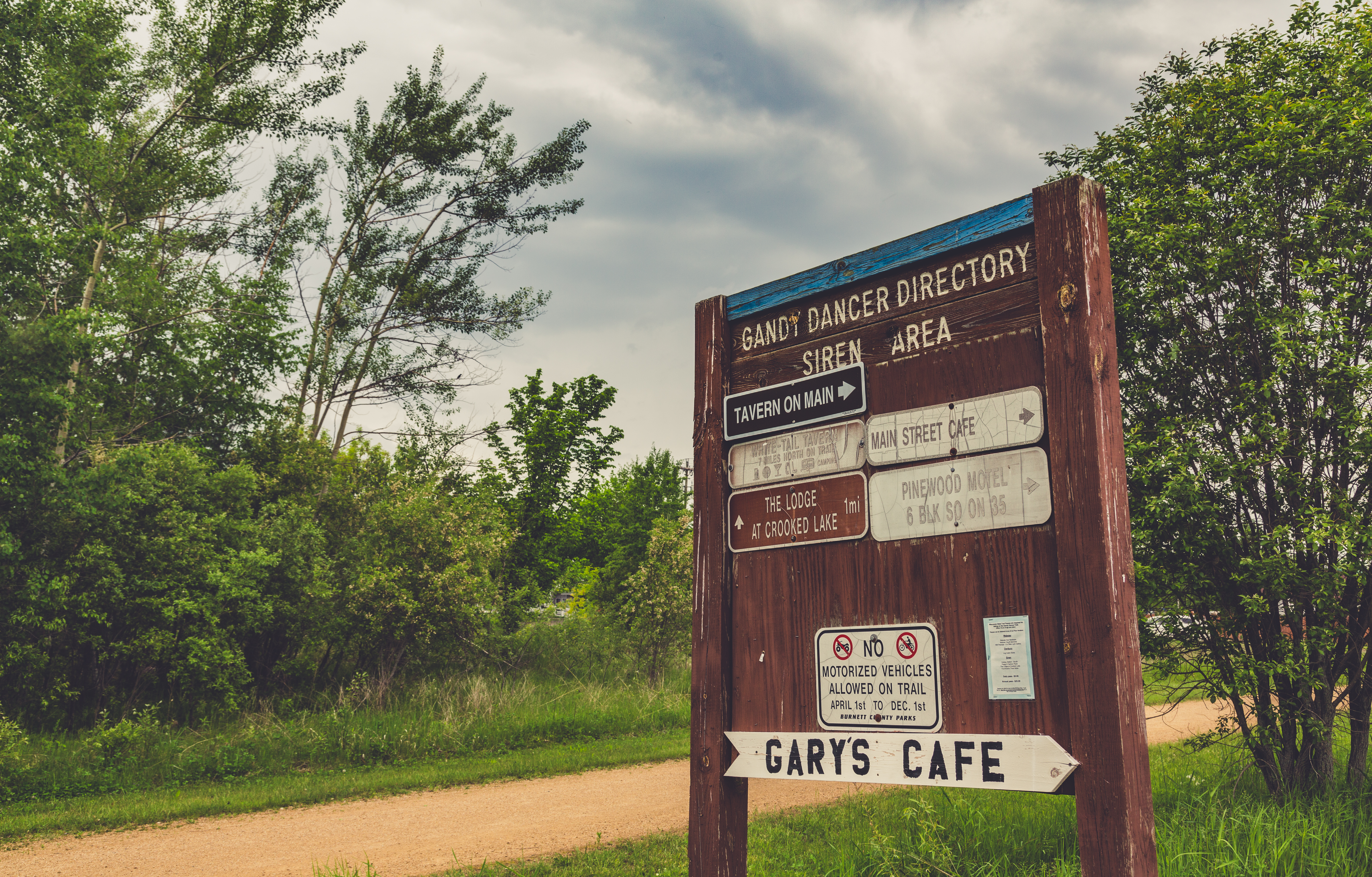
- Gandy Dancer State Trail in Siren, Wisconsin
- Length: 98 mi (158 km)
- Location: Wisconsin and Minnesota, USA
- Designation: multi-use
- Trailheads: St. Croix Falls, Wisconsin and Superior, Wisconsin
- Difficulty: easy
- Surface: crushed stone
- Website: https://dnr.wisconsin.gov/topic/parks/gandydancer

Trail map
- Map

The Gandy Dancer State Trail is a 98-mile recreational trail spanning through Wisconsin and Minnesota. The trail is managed by Polk, Burnett, and Douglas County in Wisconsin and the Minnesota Department of Natural Resources in Minnesota.

== Route ==
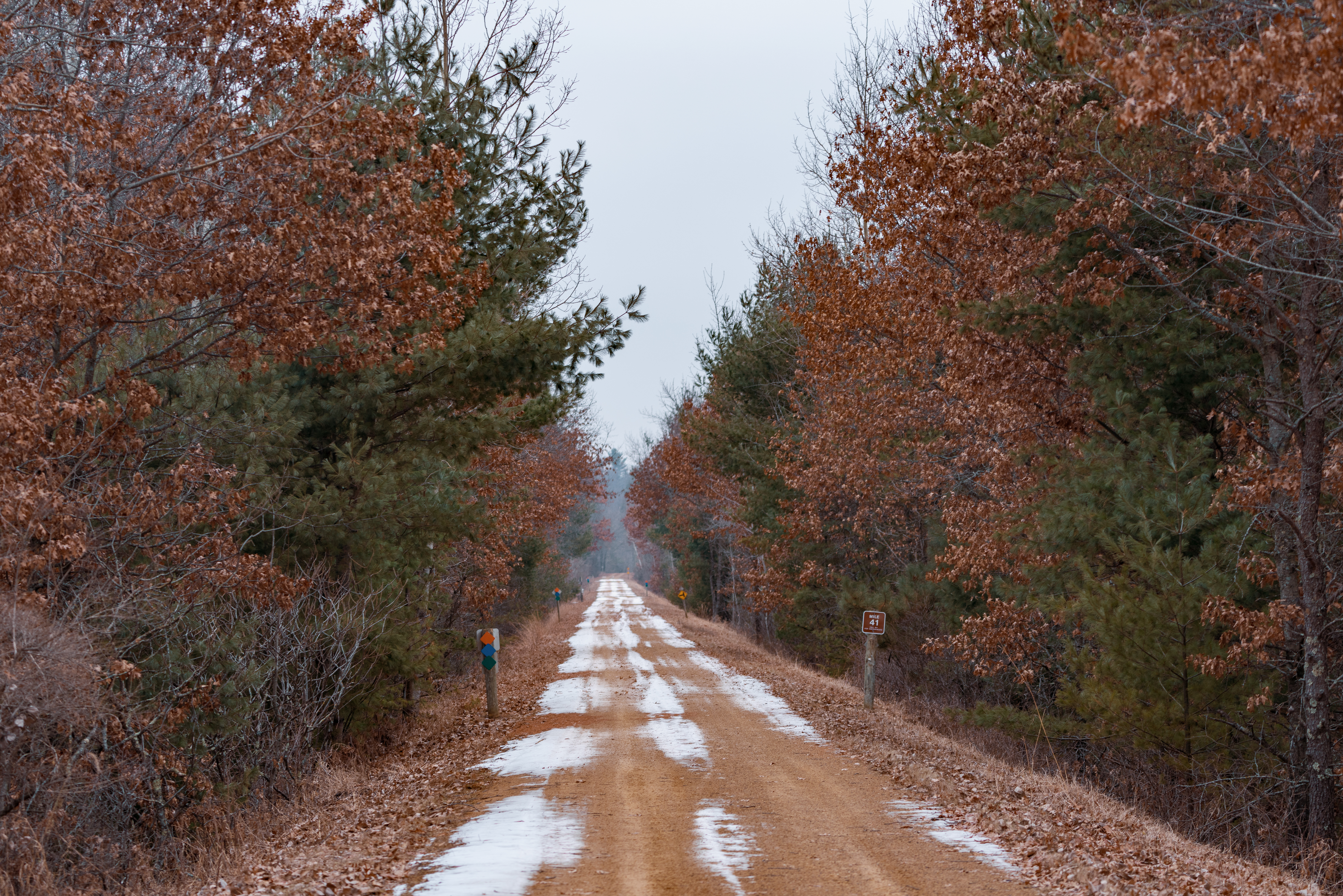
Gandy Dancer State Trail in Webster, Wisconsin

The trail follows the old Minneapolis, St. Paul and Sault Ste. Marie railroad grade from St. Croix Falls to Superior. The trail is divided up into a north and south segment with the southern segment accounting for 47 miles all in Wisconsin and the northern segment accounting for 51 miles in both Minnesota and Wisconsin. The Ice Age Trail follows the Gandy Dancer State Trail for 19 miles from St. Croix Falls past the town of Luck.

== History ==
A gandy dancer was a slang term used for American railroad workers that would build and maintain tracks by hand. The term likely originated from the Gandy Manufacturing Company based in Chicago which produced railroad tools. These workers were known to sing and keep their voices and feet in unison which led to them being described as dancers. In 1990 a naming contest was held for the naming of the trail. The name Gandy Dancer was chosen to honor the railroad workers who built the tracks.

== Use ==
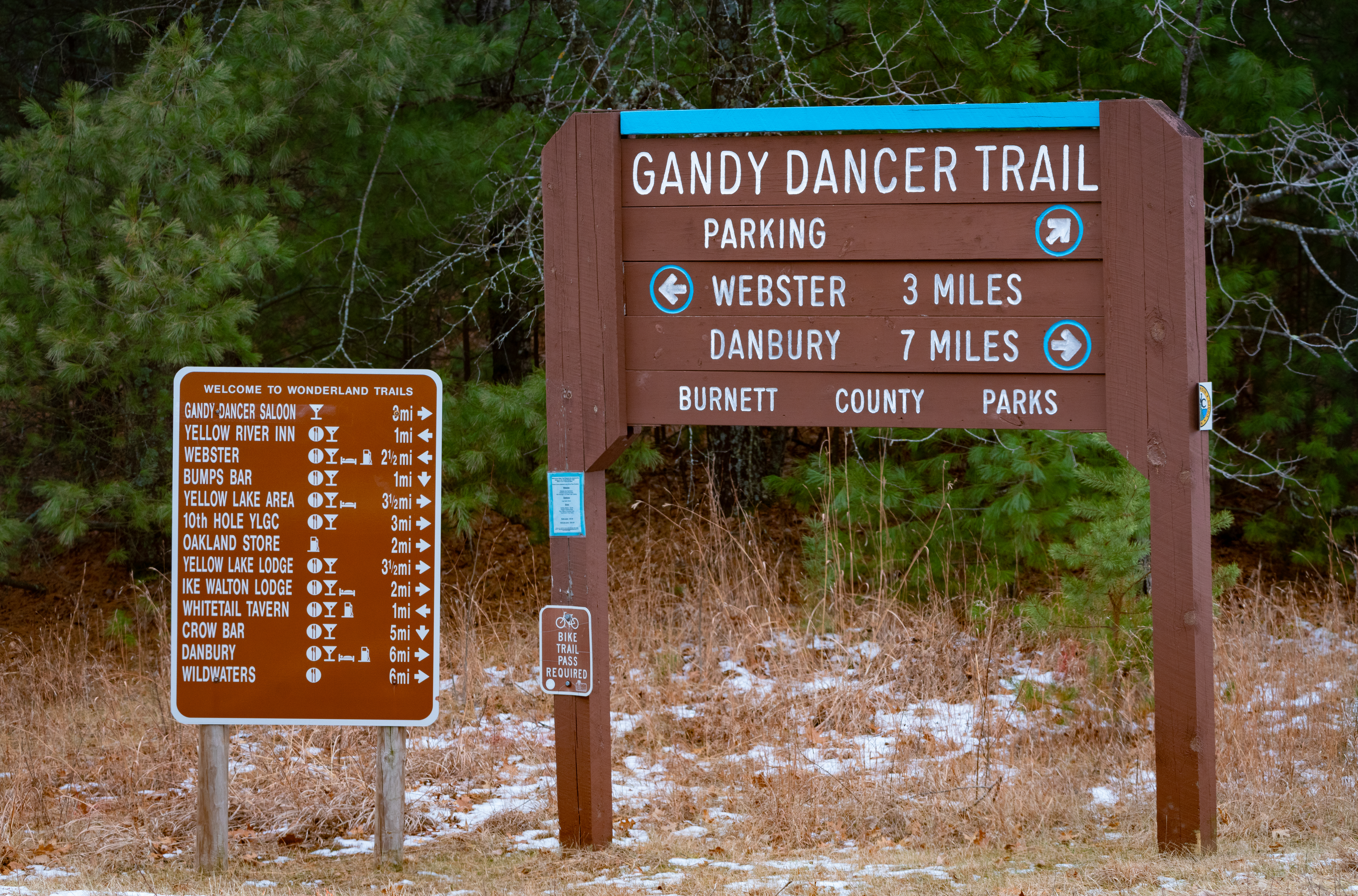
Gandy Dancer Trail Sign

Trail activities vary depending on the trail segment and time of year. Hiking and bicycling is open throughout the entire trail however bikes with an off-road tread are recommended for the northern segment due to the soft and uneven parts of the trail. The Douglas County section in the northern segment also allows all-terrain vehicles year-round and horseback riding. Snowmobiling is allowed on the trail with the local counties deciding when to open and close the trails to snowmobilers. Hunting and trapping is not permitted anywhere along the trail.
