= Danbury, Wisconsin =

Census-designated place in Wisconsin, United States

Danbury, Wisconsin Bikoganaagan
- Census-designated place
- Location within the state of Wisconsin
- Coordinates: 46°0′22″N 92°22′16″W
- Country: United States
- State: Wisconsin
- County: Burnett
- Town: Swiss

Area
  - Total: 1.264 sq mi (3.27 km^{2})
  - Land: 1.264 sq mi (3.27 km^{2})
  - Water: 0 sq mi (0 km^{2})

Population (2010)
  - Total: 172
  - Density: 136/sq mi (52.5/km^{2})
- Time zone: UTC-6 (Central (CST))
  - Summer (DST): UTC-5 (CDT)
- ZIP Codes: 54830
- Area codes: 715 & 534

Danbury is an unincorporated census-designated place in Burnett County, Wisconsin, United States. The community is located in the southwest corner of the town of Swiss. Its ZIP Code is 54830. As of the 2020 census, Danbury had a population of 165. The main intersection in the community is located at the intersection of two state highways, (Wisconsin Highway 35 and Wisconsin Highway 77).

== Geography ==
Danbury is located at 46.006N. The longitude is -92.371W. It is in the Central Standard Time Zone. The elevation is 938 feet (286 m) above sea level.

=== Climate ===
Climate data for Danbury, Wisconsin (1991–2020)
Month	Jan	Feb	Mar	Apr	May	Jun	Jul	Aug	Sep	Oct	Nov	Dec	Year
Mean daily maximum °F (°C)	21.6 (−5.8)	27.4 (−2.6)	39.7 (4.3)	53.9 (12.2)	67.3 (19.6)	75.5 (24.2)	79.7 (26.5)	78.1 (25.6)	70.0 (21.1)	55.9 (13.3)	40.2 (4.6)	26.8 (−2.9)	53.0 (11.7)
Daily mean °F (°C)	11.9 (−11.2)	16.9 (−8.4)	29.4 (−1.4)	42.7 (5.9)	55.4 (13.0)	64.2 (17.9)	69.0 (20.6)	67.1 (19.5)	59.1 (15.1)	45.9 (7.7)	32.0 (0.0)	18.8 (−7.3)	42.7 (6.0)
Mean daily minimum °F (°C)	2.2 (−16.6)	6.5 (−14.2)	19.0 (−7.2)	31.4 (−0.3)	43.6 (6.4)	52.8 (11.6)	58.3 (14.6)	56.0 (13.3)	48.3 (9.1)	35.9 (2.2)	23.8 (−4.6)	10.8 (−11.8)	32.4 (0.2)
Average precipitation inches (mm)	0.72 (18)	0.79 (20)	1.26 (32)	2.67 (68)	3.59 (91)	4.08 (104)	4.22 (107)	3.89 (99)	3.58 (91)	3.01 (76)	1.39 (35)	0.90 (23)	30.1 (764)
Average snowfall inches (cm)	10.3 (26)	10.2 (26)	9.3 (24)	3.6 (9.1)	0.1 (0.25)	0.0 (0.0)	0.0 (0.0)	0.0 (0.0)	0.0 (0.0)	0.5 (1.3)	6.7 (17)	11.9 (30)	52.6 (133.65)
Source: NOAA

== Demographics ==
As of the census of 2000, there were 2,851 people and 1,312 households residing in the Danbury ZCTA. The racial makeup of the ZCTA was 91.1% White, 0.4% Black or African American, 6.1% Native American or Alaska Native, 0.1% Asian, and 2.1% from two or more races. Hispanic or Latino of any race were 0.6% of the population.

There were 1,312 households, out of which 15.9% had children under the age of 18 living with them, 57.5% were married couples living together, 6.1% had a female householder with no husband present, and 32.9.3% were non-families. 28.4% of all households were made up of individuals, and 12.2% had someone living alone who was 65 years of age or older. The average household size was 2.16 and the average family size was 2.57.

3.5% of the total population was under 5 years of age, 83.5% were 18 years and over, and 26.4% are 65 years and over.

The median household income in the ZCTA was $32,219, and the median income for a family was $37,845. Males had a median income of $31,133 versus $18,167 for females. The per capita income for the ZCTA was $17,596. About 5.4% of families and 9.2% of the population were below the poverty line, including 8.8% of individuals.

== Local events and attractions ==
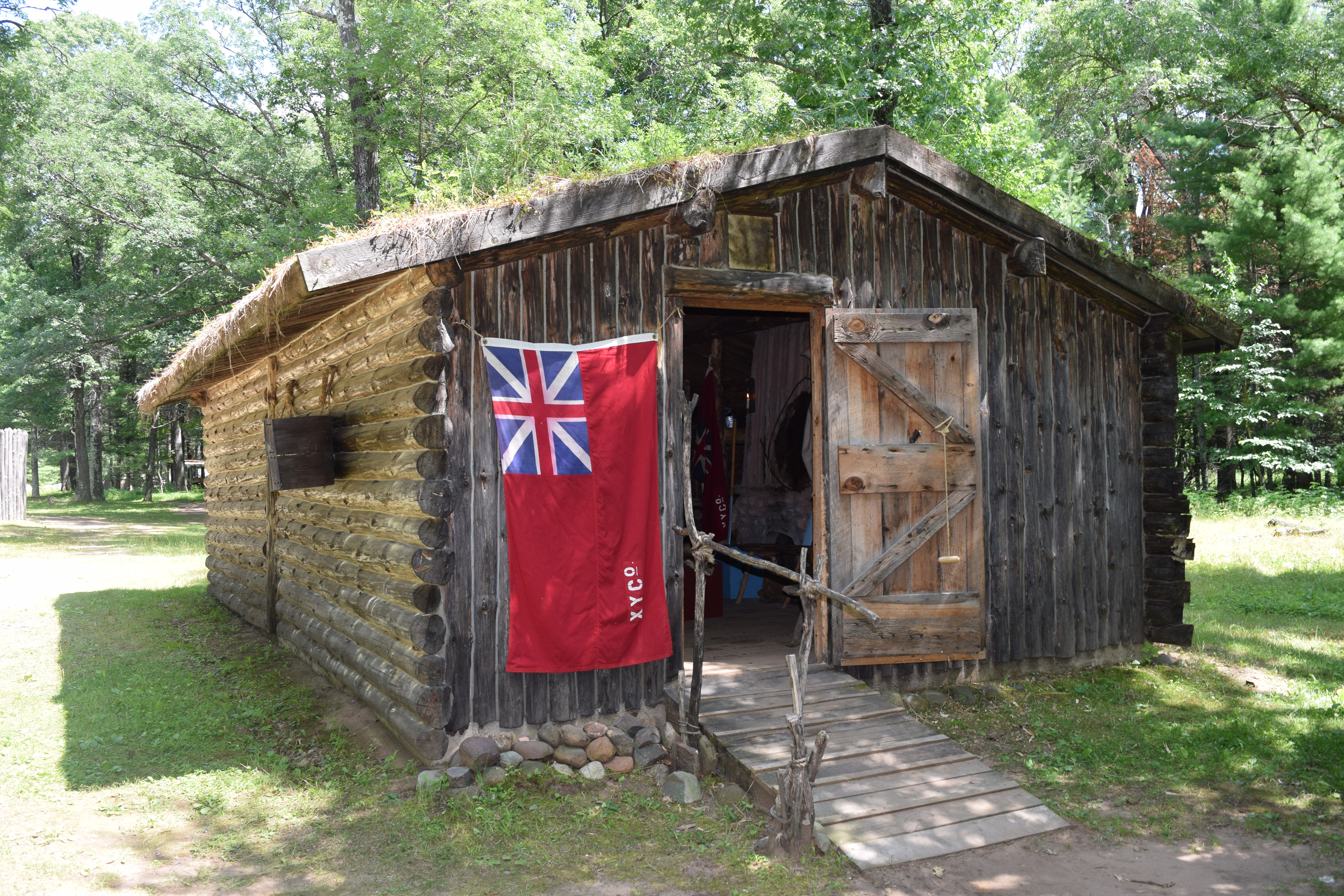
The reconstructed XY Company trading post at Forts Folle Avoine Historical Park

- Danbury Days is a 4 July weekend parade that draws over 2500 people each year with vendors and food.
- Forts Folle Avoine Historical Park is located on 80 acres (320,000 m^{2}) wooded along the Yellow River. The park is listed on the National Register of Historic Places and consists of reconstructed fur trade posts that occupy the actual sites where they were once operated from 1802 to 1805. The trade post were re-discovered in 1969 by Harris and Francis Palmer and Gene and Lafayette Connor and information in the journals of George Nelson, the XY Company clerk, eventually led researchers to the site.
- The St. Croix Chippewa Indian Band of the Lake Superior Chippewa holds its annual St. Croix Wild Rice Pow-wow hosting drums and singers from all over North America. The three-day celebration features drum and dance contests, huge feasts and a large variety of food and craft vendors.
- The Village Players Community Theatre was formed in 1999 to provide theater for the Northwestern Wisconsin. The theater provides a source of entertainment and opportunity for all participants, including actors, stage production, directors, and the viewing audience.
- James Jordan Buck Day was officially proclaimed to be on November 20, 2014, by Wisconsin State Governor, Scott Walker. The day is a remembrance of the record setting white-tailed deer harvested by James Jordan in 1914. The James Jordan Buck is the largest typical white-tailed deer ever harvested in the United States using the Boone and Crockett Club's scoring system. The buck scored 206 1/8 points, which currently ranks it as the number two white-tailed deer in the world behind the Milo Hanson Buck, which was shot in 1993 in Saskatchewan and scores 213 5/8 points.
