= Becklin =

Becklin is a surname. Notable people with the surname include:

- Cooper Becklin (born 2004), American racing driver
- Eric Becklin (born 1940), American astrophysicist
- Lynn H. Becklin (born 1932), American politician
- Robert C. Becklin (1926–2012), American businessman and politician
