= Brian Johnson (politician) =

American politician (born 1961)

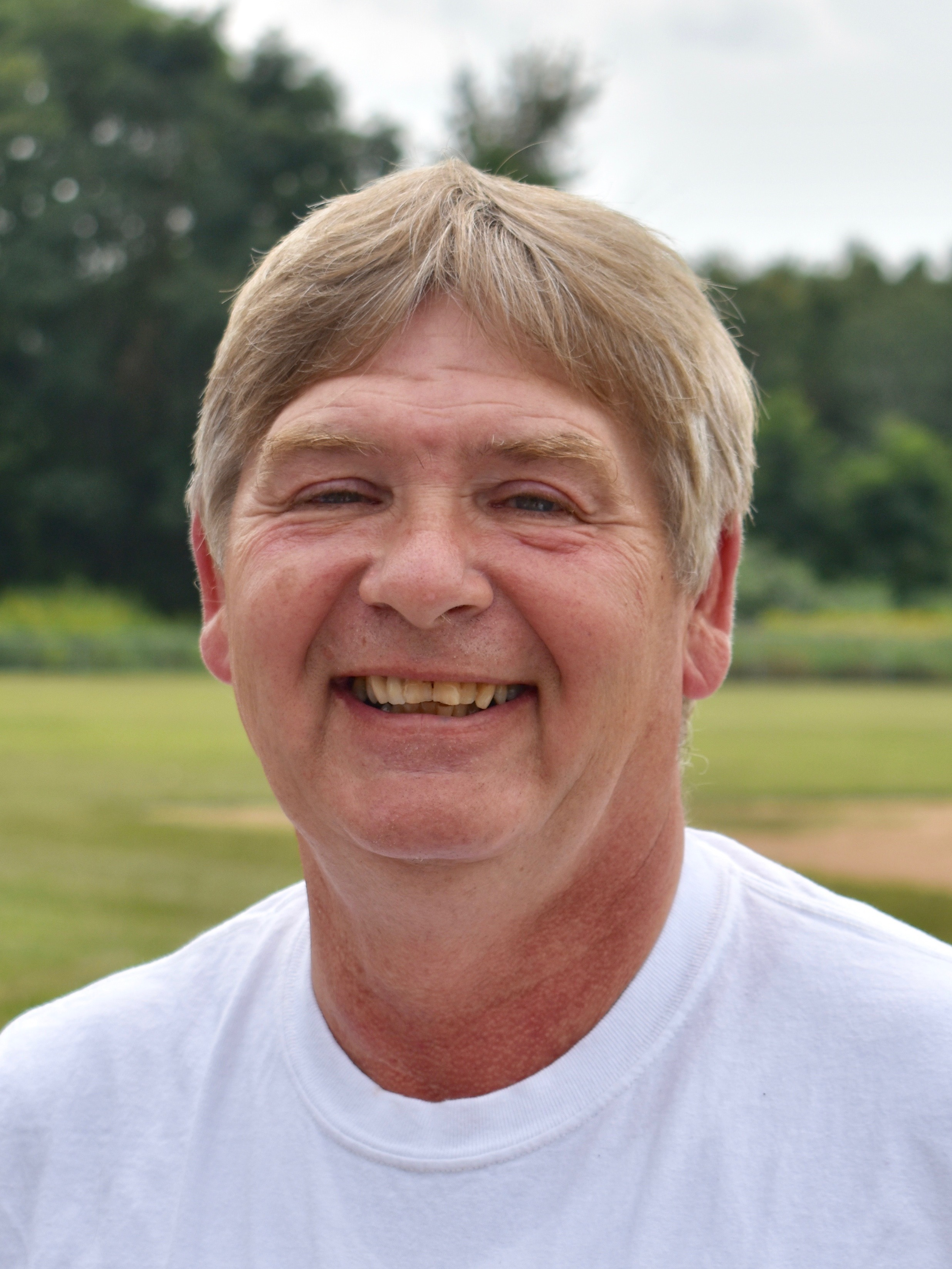
- Johnson in 2018

Member of the Minnesota House of Representatives from the 28A district
- In office January 8, 2013 – January 14, 2025
- Preceded by: Roger Crawford
- Succeeded by: Jimmy Gordon

Personal details
- Born: June 27, 1961 (age 65)
- Party: Republican
- Spouse: Diane
- Children: 1
- Education: Hibbing Area Vocational Technical Institute (A.A.S.)
- Occupation: Retired law enforcement; Legislator
- Website: Government website Campaign website

Brian Johnson (born June 27, 1961) is an American politician who served in the Minnesota House of Representatives from 2013 to 2025. A member of the Republican Party of Minnesota, Johnson represented District 28A in eastern Minnesota, which includes the cities of Cambridge, Isanti, and North Branch, and parts of Chisago and Isanti Counties.

== Early life, education, and career ==
Johnson grew up on a dairy farm and attended Cambridge High School. He graduated from Hibbing Community College, now Minnesota North College Hibbing, with an associate degree in law enforcement.

Johnson worked as a firefighter and EMT in Braham and was a deputy sheriff in Isanti County for 17 years.

== Minnesota House of Representatives ==
Johnson was elected to the Minnesota House of Representatives in 2012 and was reelected every two years through 2022. He first ran after redistricting and after one-term Republican incumbent Roger Crawford announced he would not seek reelection. Johnson supported Jason Lewis's 2020 campaign for U.S. Senate.

Johnson was the minority lead on the Housing Finance and Policy Committee and sat on the Judiciary Finance and Civil Law Committee. He served as vice chair of the Public Safety & Security Policy and Finance Committee during the 2017 legislative session. After chair Tony Cornish resigned following multiple allegations of sexual harassment, Johnson became chair of the committee for the 2018 session.

In the 2024 election, Johnson lost the Republican primary to Isanti mayor Jimmy Gordon.

=== Public safety ===
Johnson opposed various criminal justice reform proposals put forward by House Democrats, and accused the DFL of being "hostile" to police and "pushing an anti-law enforcement and defund the police policies". He opposed legislation requiring law enforcement to release unedited body camera footage after deadly force incidents to the families of the victims within 48 hours of the event. After the police killing of Daunte Wright, Johnson said, "it's unfortunate that he didn't comply and go to jail". He voted against legislation to ban no-knock warrants and opposed a bipartisan bill to return the right to vote to felons on parole, saying he believed it was unconstitutional. Johnson opposed legislation to legalize marijuana in Minnesota and a bill to provide driver's licenses to all Minnesotans regardless of immigration status.

Johnson supported "tough on crime" policies, such as increasing patrols in high-risk areas, increasing police recruiting, and stronger penalties for violent crime. He introduced a bill that would make assaulting police officers a felony and prevent cities from disarming officers. He also sponsored a bill making it more difficult to release convicted sex offenders and people with mental illness seeking unconditional release and a bill requiring law enforcement officials to get a warrant before using drones. He supported bipartisan legislation to allow courts to reduce or waive certain court fines based on someone's ability to pay.

Johnson authored legislation to limit the power of the Minnesota Sentencing Guidelines Commission, an independent board that helps set criminal sentences. He said he believed the commission went "way too far" when reducing penalties for drug offenders and again overstepped when it set a five-year felony probation cap.

==== Gun control ====
Johnson consistently opposed gun control legislation, saying we "have pretty good laws in place" to address gun violence. He opposed increasing background checks and red flag laws, saying, "we have to quit blaming the tool and look at what's causing it". In 2018, as public safety chair, he refused to hold hearings on gun control proposals introduced by DFLers, and later said it was too late in session to consider proposals authored by suburban Republican members.

== Electoral history ==
2012 Minnesota State House - District 32A
Party	Candidate	Votes	%
Republican	Brian Johnson	10,014	51.37
Democratic (DFL)	Paul Gammel	8,601	44.13
Constitution	Paul Bergley	851	4.37
Write-in		26	0.13
Total votes		19,492	100.0
Republican hold			

2014 Minnesota State House - District 32A
Party	Candidate	Votes	%
Republican	Brian Johnson (incumbent)	8,006	57.48
Democratic (DFL)	Paul Gammel	5,907	42.41
Write-in		15	0.11
Total votes		13,928	100.0
Republican hold			

2016 Minnesota State House - District 32A
Party	Candidate	Votes	%
Republican	Brian Johnson (incumbent)	12,928	63.00
Democratic (DFL)	Paul Gammel	7,551	36.79
Write-in		43	0.21
Total votes		20,522	100.0
Republican hold			

2018 Minnesota State House - District 32A
Party	Candidate	Votes	%
Republican	Brian Johnson (incumbent)	11,351	63.47
Democratic (DFL)	Renae Berg	6,522	36.47
Write-in		12	0.07
Total votes		17,886	100.0
Republican hold			

2020 Minnesota State House - District 32A
Party	Candidate	Votes	%
Republican	Brian Johnson (incumbent)	16,381	68.20
Democratic (DFL)	Renae Berg	7,607	31.67
Write-in		31	0.13
Total votes		24,019	100.0
Republican hold			

2022 Minnesota State House - District 28A
Party	Candidate	Votes	%
Republican	Brian Johnson (incumbent)	12,903	68.03
Democratic (DFL)	Erik Johnson	6,043	31.86
Write-in		20	0.11
Total votes		18,966	100.0
Republican hold			

2024 Minnesota House - District 28A, Republican primary
Party	Candidate	Votes	%
Republican	Jimmy Gordon	2,561	65.99
Republican	Brian Johnson (incumbent)	1,320	34.01
Total votes		3,881	100

== Personal life ==
Johnson lives with his wife, Diane, in Cambridge, Minnesota.
