= Claudia Meier Volk =

American politician

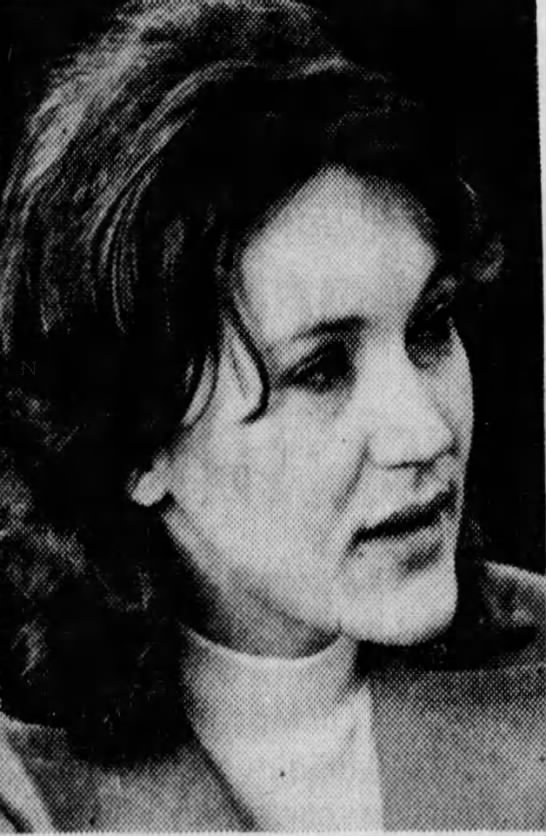
- Claudia Meier in 1975

Member of the Minnesota House of Representatives from district 18-A
- In office January 7, 1975 – January 3, 1977
- Preceded by: Lynn H. Becklin

Personal details
- Born: Claudia Meier; November 6, 1947 (age 78) Strasburg, North Dakota, U.S.
- Party: Democratic–Farmer–Labor
- Spouse: Martin Volk (m. 1975)
- Education: University of Minnesota

Claudia Meier Volk (born Claudia Meier; November 6, 1947) is an American politician and nurse. After serving in multiple executive positions in government, politics, and public health in the U.S. state of Minnesota, Meier was elected to the Minnesota House of Representatives at the age of 26 from district 18-A, on a platform primarily focused on health care.

Meier's tenure included efforts to bolster the rights of women, gays, and lesbians; she coauthored a bill that would have banned discrimination against gays and lesbians. She also wrote a law that freed women from having to take their husbands' last names when they got married; shortly after the law was passed, Meier married Martin Volk and took his last name. Claudia Volk moved to Ray, North Dakota, to live with Volk, and chose not to seek reelection in 1976. Her term expired in 1977.

== Career ==
Before her election to office, Meier was a registered nurse who served as the Stearns and Benton County Public Health Nurse. She was also the chairwoman of the Benton County Democratic–Farmer–Labor (DFL) Party and the vice president of the Little Rock Lake Improvement Association, and served on the boards of Minnesota Politically Involved Nurses and People United for Sound Health, as well as the Central Minnesota Health Planning Task Force.

In 1974, she was unanimously endorsed by the DFL as a candidate for the Minnesota House of Representatives from district 18-A, which covers parts of the counties of Benton, Sherburne, Millie Lacs, and Isanti. Meier was a resident of Rice at the time. The incumbent representative, Lynn Becklin, was retiring and chose not to seek the seat for another term. A month after the endorsement, she filed for office with the Secretary of State, emphasizing health care in rural Minnesota as a part of her platform.

Meier had no challengers in the primary, so she won that election in nearly every precinct except for one, where she tied. She won the November 5 general election that year with 5,516 votes, to Republican Mike Ives' 4,639, thus securing her first term in the legislature one day before she turned 27. Mike Ives told the St. Cloud Times that he got "caught in the DFL sweep that took place across the nation".

=== Minnesota House of Representatives ===
Meier took office on January 7, 1975; she served on the Agriculture and Judiciary committees, as well as the Health and Welfare committee. That year, a bill came up on the House floor to appropriate $3.8 million to St. Cloud's healthcare system. Meier spoke out against an offered amendment which would have prohibited using state funds for family planning services, including contraception. Meier voted against the amendment, which failed, and for the final bill.

Meier also cosponsored a bill which sought to repeal a state requirement that a bride take the last name of the groom in getting married. The bill was enacted shortly before Meier herself got married, although she chose to take her husband's last name. Meier was also part of a group that proposed a bill prohibiting violation of the Ten Commandments, after being frustrated by other legislators who used moral and biblical arguments to allow the state to regulate the sexual practices of consenting adults. The group also proposed legislation banning discrimination against gays and lesbians.

== Personal life ==
Claudia Meier was born in Strasburg, North Dakota, on November 6, 1947. Her family moved to Minneapolis when she was five. Meier says that she has been active in politics since ninth grade; she attended Osseo High School, the College of St. Scholastica, and the University of Minnesota, receiving a B.S.N. in nursing from the last.

In 1975, Meier married 38-year-old Martin Volk, a longtime friend and business manager at a telephone co-op in Ray, North Dakota. Due to her work as a legislator in another state, they chose to maintain separate homes and commute to each other on the weekends. Despite her push for the maiden names bill, she chose to take Volk's last name; she told the St. Cloud Times that "I sponsored it because I believe everybody should have the choice, but we're both pretty traditional". Rick Nolan attended the wedding. Claudia Volk did not seek reelection in 1976, having moved to Ray.
