= Minnesota State Highway 107 =

State highway in Minnesota, United States

Trunk Highway 107
- MN 107 highlighted in red

Route information
- Maintained by MnDOT
- Length: 17.571 mi (28.278 km)
- Existed: April 22, 1933–present

Major junctions
- South end: MN 65 near Braham
- MN 70 near Braham; MN 70 near Grasston
- North end: MN 23 near Brook Park

Location
- Country: United States
- State: Minnesota
- Counties: Isanti, Kanabec, Pine

Highway system
- Minnesota Trunk Highway System; Interstate; US; State; Legislative; Scenic
← MN 106	→ MN 108

Minnesota State Highway 107 (MN 107) is a 17.571-mile-long (28.278 km) highway in east-central Minnesota, which runs from its intersection with State Highway 65 in Stanchfield Township near Braham and continues north to its northern terminus at its intersection with State Highway 23 in Pine County near Brook Park.

Highway 107 passes through the communities of Braham, Grasston, and Henriette.

== Route description ==
Highway 107 serves as a north–south route between Braham, Grasston, Henriette, and Brook Park. It is geographically located between the cities of Cambridge and Hinckley in east-central Minnesota and parallels Interstate 35 and State Highway 65 throughout its route.

The route intersects State Highway 70 twice. Highway 107 and Highway 70 are concurrent for two miles between Braham and Grasston.

Highway 107 is also known as Main Avenue in Braham.

The original part of the route is legally defined as Route 134 in the Minnesota Statutes. The southern portion is part of Minnesota Constitutional Route 5. It is not marked with either of these numbers.

== History ==
Highway 107 was authorized in 1933 between Grasston and Brook Park.

Present day Highway 107 was originally numbered Highway 65 between Braham and Grasston from 1934 to 1942. Nearby Highway 65 was built on a new alignment c. 1942 and this old section of 65 between Braham and Grasston was renumbered 107 as a southerly extension of the existing Highway 107.

All of Highway 107 was paved by 1960.

== Major intersections ==
County	Location	mi	km	Destinations	Notes
Isanti	Stanchfield Township	0.000	0.000	MN 65 – Cambridge	Southern terminus
Isanti	Braham	1.238	1.992	CSAH 4 east, CR 66 west	
Isanti	Braham	2.226	3.582	CSAH 4 west	
Kanabec	Grass Lake Township	4.286	6.898	MN 70 east to I-35	Southern end of MN 70 concurrency
Kanabec	Grass Lake Township	5.565	8.956	CSAH 28 east, CR 42 west	
Kanabec	Grass Lake Township	6.055	9.745	MN 70 west to MN 65	Northern end of MN 70 concurrency
Kanabec	Grasston	6.779	10.910	CSAH 7 east, CSAH 17 west (Pine Street)	
Pine	Pokegama Township	11.986	19.290	CSAH 11 west	
Pine	Pokegama Township	12.234	19.689	CSAH 11 east (Pokegama Avenue) – Pine City	
Pine	Brook Park Township	17.537	28.223	MN 23 – Hinckley, Mora	Northern terminus
1.000 mi = 1.609 km; 1.000 km = 0.621 mi: Concurrency terminus
