= Minnesota State Highway 361 =

State highway in Minnesota, United States

Trunk Highway 361
- MN 361 highlighted in red

Route information
- Maintained by MnDOT
- Length: 7.281 mi (11.718 km)
- Existed: 1969–2011

Major junctions
- South end: I-35 at Rush City
- North end: MN 70 at Rock Creek

Location
- Country: United States
- State: Minnesota
- Counties: Chisago, Pine

Highway system
- Minnesota Trunk Highway System; Interstate; US; State; Legislative; Scenic
← MN 336	→ MN 371

Minnesota State Highway 361 (MN 361 or TH 361) was a 7.281-mile-long (11.718 km) highway in east-central Minnesota, which ran from an interchange with Interstate 35 (I-35) in Rush City and continued briefly east and then north to MN 70 in Rock Creek. The roadway was formerly part of the U.S. Highway 61.

== Route description ==
MN 361 began at a diamond interchange with I-35 in Rush City and traveled east along 4th Street. The route ran through the business district of the city and crossed the St. Croix Valley Railroad before turning north on Bremer Avenue. Once on Bremer Avenue, MN 361 curved slightly to the northeast and left Rush City. North of the city limits, the highway passed to the west of the Rush City Regional Airport. It then continued north, leaving Chisago County and entering Pine County, while closely paralleling the railroad. As the route entered Pine County, it also entered the city limits of Rock Creek, in which it was known as Forest Boulevard. In Rock Creek, MN 361 turned to the northwest and passed under the railroad before ending at an intersection with MN 70.

== History ==
Highway 361 was established in 1969 to maintain unmarked Minnesota Constitutional Route 1 through the cities of Rush City, Rock Creek, and Pine City after U.S. Highway 61 was moved to Interstate 35. The section of Highway 361 between Rock Creek and Pine City was turned back to Pine County maintenance in 2003, and was renumbered Pine County Highway 61. Its previous northern terminus from 1967 to 2003 was at its intersection with old State Highway 324 in Pine City, now marked as Pine County Highway 7. The rest of the roadway was turned over Chisago and Pine counties in 2011.

== Major intersections ==
County	Location	mi	km	Destinations	Notes
Chisago	Rush City	0.074	0.119	I-35 CSAH 1 west (Rush Lake Road)	Southern terminus
Chisago	Rush City	0.488	0.785	CSAH 39 (Fairfield Avenue)	
Chisago	Rush City	1.415	2.277	CSAH 30 south (Forest Boulevard) / CR 55 east (Rushseba Trail)	
Chisago	Rushseba Township	3.690	5.938	CSAH 3 east / CR 56 (550th Street)	
Pine	Rock Creek	6.650	10.702	CSAH 2 east / CR 109 west	
Pine	Rock Creek	7.281	11.718	MN 70 CSAH 61 north (Forest Avenue)	Northern terminus
1.000 mi = 1.609 km; 1.000 km = 0.621 mi
