= Braham, Minnesota =

City in Minnesota, United States

Braham
- City
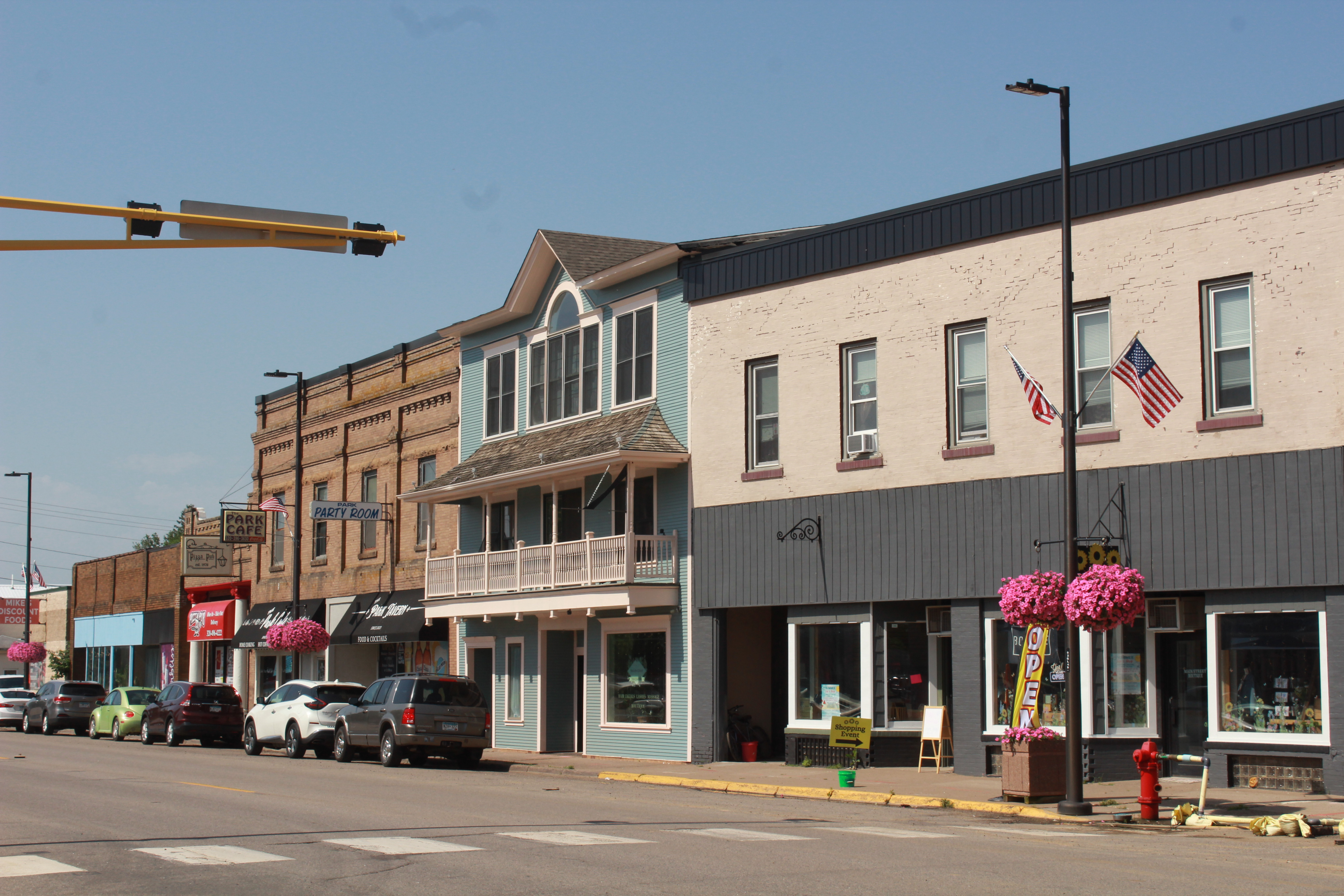
- Commercial businesses along Main Avenue
- Motto: "Homemade Pie Capital of Minnesota"
- Interactive map of Braham
- Coordinates: 45°43′20″N 93°10′18″W
- Country: United States
- State: Minnesota
- Counties: Isanti, Kanabec

Area
  - Total: 1.62 sq mi (4.19 km^{2})
  - Land: 1.61 sq mi (4.17 km^{2})
  - Water: 0.0077 sq mi (0.02 km^{2})
- Elevation: 958 ft (292 m)

Population (2020)
  - Total: 1,769
  - Density: 1,098.1/sq mi (423.96/km^{2})
- Time zone: UTC-6 (Central (CST))
  - Summer (DST): UTC-5 (CDT)
- ZIP code: 55006
- Area code: 320
- FIPS code: 27-07282
- GNIS feature ID: 2394236
- Website: https://brahammn.gov/

Braham is a city in Isanti and Kanabec Counties in the U.S. state of Minnesota. The population was 1,769 at the 2020 census.

Braham is 12 miles north of Cambridge, 15 miles southwest of Pine City, 16 miles south-southeast of Mora, and 12 miles west of Rush City.

== History ==
A post office called Braham has been in operation since 1891. The city was named by railroad officials.

== Pie Day ==
Every year on the first Friday in August, the people of Braham celebrate Pie Day. This celebration includes craft sales, music, food stands, games, entertainment, and various types of pie.

Braham was declared the Pie Capital of Minnesota by former Governor Rudy Perpich in 1990. It became famous for its pie in the 1930s and 1940s when Minnesotans took the "shortcut to Duluth through Braham." While taking this shortcut, people stopped in Braham and visited the Park Cafe, the cafe that made Braham pie famous. Pie Day began in July 1990, after Independence Day, as an ice-cream social for fundraising and other charitable activities. The date was changed to the first Friday in August when the Isanti County Historical Society took charge of the event in 1992.

== Geography ==
According to the United States Census Bureau, the city has an area of 1.62 square miles (4.20 km^{2}), of which 1.61 square miles (4.17 km^{2}) is land and 0.01 square miles (0.03 km^{2}) is water.

Braham is along Lower Stanchfield Branch.

== Demographics ==
Historical population
| Census | Pop. | Note | %± |
|---|---|---|---|
| 1910 | 406 | | — |
| 1920 | 511 | | 25.9% |
| 1930 | 579 | | 13.3% |
| 1940 | 578 | | −0.2% |
| 1950 | 697 | | 20.6% |
| 1960 | 728 | | 4.4% |
| 1970 | 744 | | 2.2% |
| 1980 | 1,015 | | 36.4% |
| 1990 | 1,139 | | 12.2% |
| 2000 | 1,276 | | 12.0% |
| 2010 | 1,793 | | 40.5% |
| 2020 | 1,769 | | −1.3% |
U.S. Decennial Census

=== 2020 census ===
As of the 2020 census, Braham had a population of 1,769. The median age was 34.5 years. 27.0% of residents were under the age of 18 and 14.5% of residents were 65 years of age or older. For every 100 females there were 91.5 males, and for every 100 females age 18 and over there were 86.7 males age 18 and over.

0.0% of residents lived in urban areas, while 100.0% lived in rural areas.

There were 739 households in Braham, of which 35.2% had children under the age of 18 living in them. Of all households, 38.4% were married-couple households, 17.1% were households with a male householder and no spouse or partner present, and 33.3% were households with a female householder and no spouse or partner present. About 31.1% of all households were made up of individuals and 12.8% had someone living alone who was 65 years of age or older.

There were 768 housing units, of which 3.8% were vacant. The homeowner vacancy rate was 1.4% and the rental vacancy rate was 4.0%.

Racial composition as of the 2020 census
| Race | Number | Percent |
|---|---|---|
| White | 1,611 | 91.1% |
| Black or African American | 17 | 1.0% |
| American Indian and Alaska Native | 7 | 0.4% |
| Asian | 8 | 0.5% |
| Native Hawaiian and Other Pacific Islander | 3 | 0.2% |
| Some other race | 8 | 0.5% |
| Two or more races | 115 | 6.5% |
| Hispanic or Latino (of any race) | 48 | 2.7% |

=== 2010 census ===
As of the census of 2010, there were 1,793 people, 708 households, and 457 families living in the city. The population density was 1,113.7 inhabitants per square mile (430.0/km^{2}). There were 755 housing units at an average density of 468.9 per square mile (181.0/km^{2}). The racial makeup of the city was 96.7% White, 0.5% African American, 0.2% Native American, 0.4% Asian, 0.1% from other races, and 2.1% from two or more races. Hispanic or Latino of any race were 1.1% of the population.

There were 708 households, of which 39.0% had children under the age of 18 living with them, 41.9% were married couples living together, 16.0% had a female householder with no husband present, 6.6% had a male householder with no wife present, and 35.5% were non-families. 29.9% of all households were made up of individuals, and 15.1% had someone living alone who was 65 years of age or older. The average household size was 2.52 and the average family size was 3.09.

The median age in the city was 30.5 years. 30.5% of residents were under the age of 18; 8.1% were between the ages of 18 and 24; 29% were from 25 to 44; 19.5% were from 45 to 64; and 12.8% were 65 years of age or older. The gender makeup of the city was 46.3% male and 53.7% female.

=== 2000 census ===
As of the census of 2000, there were 1,276 people, 511 households, and 331 families living in the city. The population density was 1,010.9 inhabitants per square mile (390.3/km^{2}). There were 566 housing units at an average density of 448.4 per square mile (173.1/km^{2}). The racial makeup of the city was 97.18% White, 0.31% Black or African American, 0.94% Native American, 0.31% Asian, and 1.25% from two or more races. Hispanic or Latino of any race were 0.24% of the population.

There were 511 households, out of which 37.8% had children under the age of 18 living with them, 44.8% married couples lived together, 15.1% had a female householder with no husband present, and 35.2% were non-families. 29.7% of all households were of individuals and 16.8% had someone living alone 65 years of age or older. The average household size was 2.49 and the average family size was 3.06.

In the city, the population was dispersed with 29.7% under the age of 18, 10.0% from 18 to 24, 30.2% from 25 to 44, 16.8% from 45 to 64, and 13.4% who were 65 years of age or older. The median age was 32 years. For every 100 females, there were 95.7 males. For every 100 females age 18 and over, there were 87.3 males.

The median income for a household in the city was $34,830, and the median income for a family was $43,229. Males had a median income of $32,455 versus $22,750 for females. The per capita income for the city was $16,693. About 13.1% of families and 14% of the population were below the poverty line, including 18.1% of those under age 18 and 12.0% of those age 65 or over.

== Sports ==
=== Former basketball champions ===
Braham's boys basketball team, the Bombers, won three straight Class AA state championships in 2004–2006. The girls basketball team won the 2011 Class AA state championship. The boys team won another state title in 2016.

== Infrastructure ==
=== Transportation ===
==== Major highways ====
The following routes are in the Braham area.

- Minnesota State Highway 65
- Minnesota State Highway 70
- Minnesota State Highway 107

Highways 65 and 107 are two of the main routes in Braham. Highway 70 is nearby.

==== County Roads ====
- Isanti County Road 4
- Isanti County Road 36

== Notable people ==
- Robert C. Becklin, Minnesota state representative
- Noah Dahlman, professional basketball player
- Marlene Johnson, lieutenant governor of Minnesota
- Jerome P. Peterson, Minnesota state representative

== Gallery ==
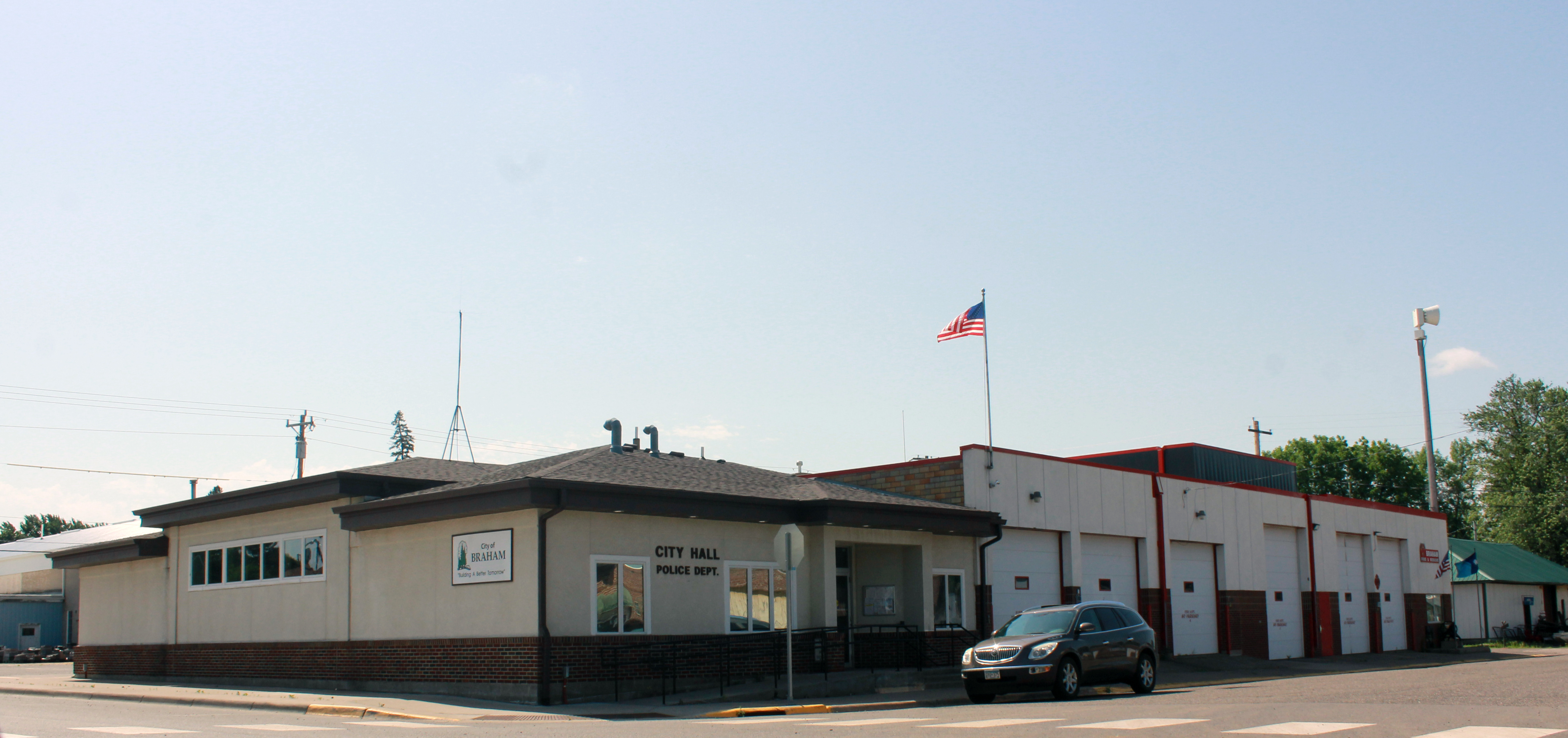
City Hall and Police Department

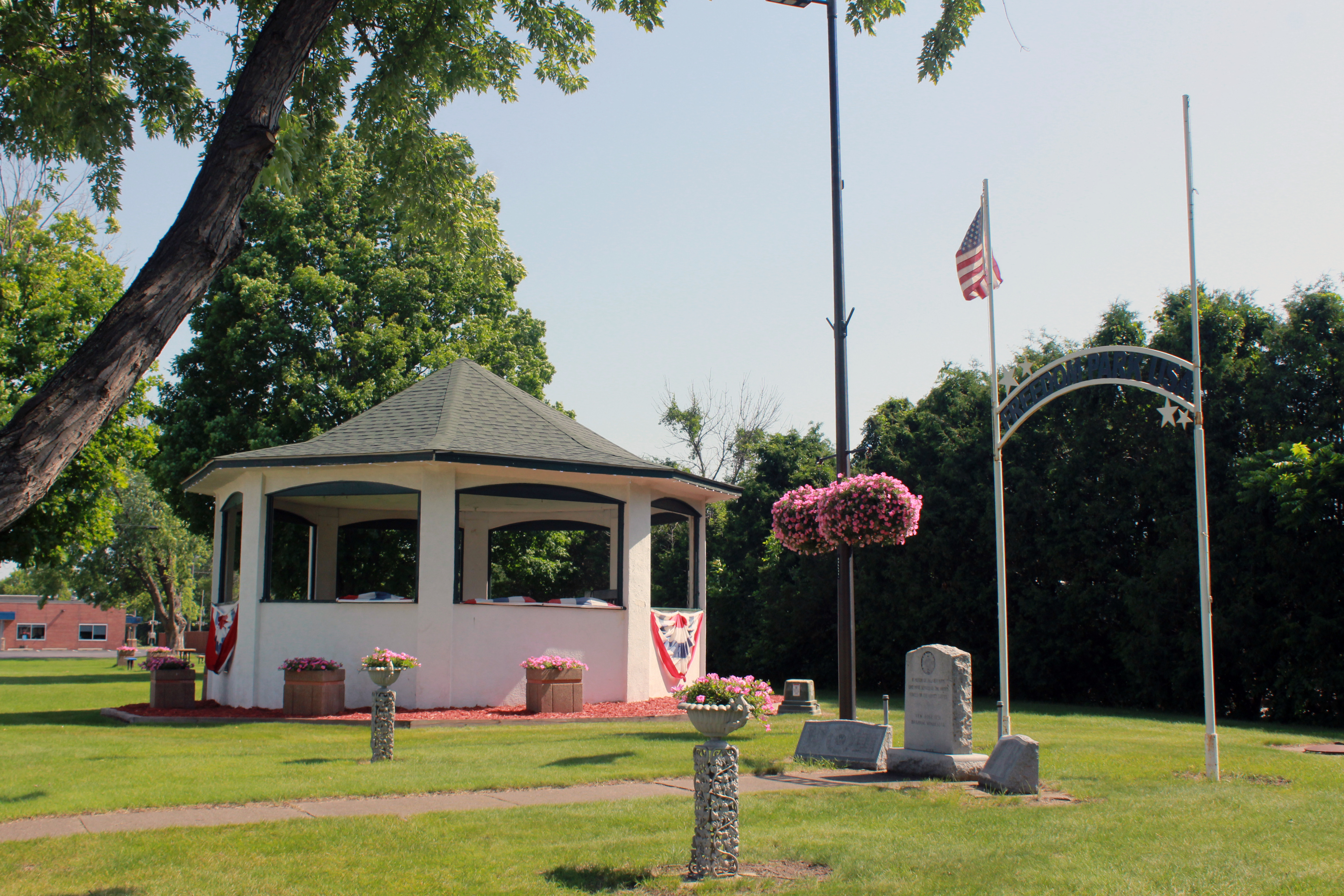
Freedom Park USA

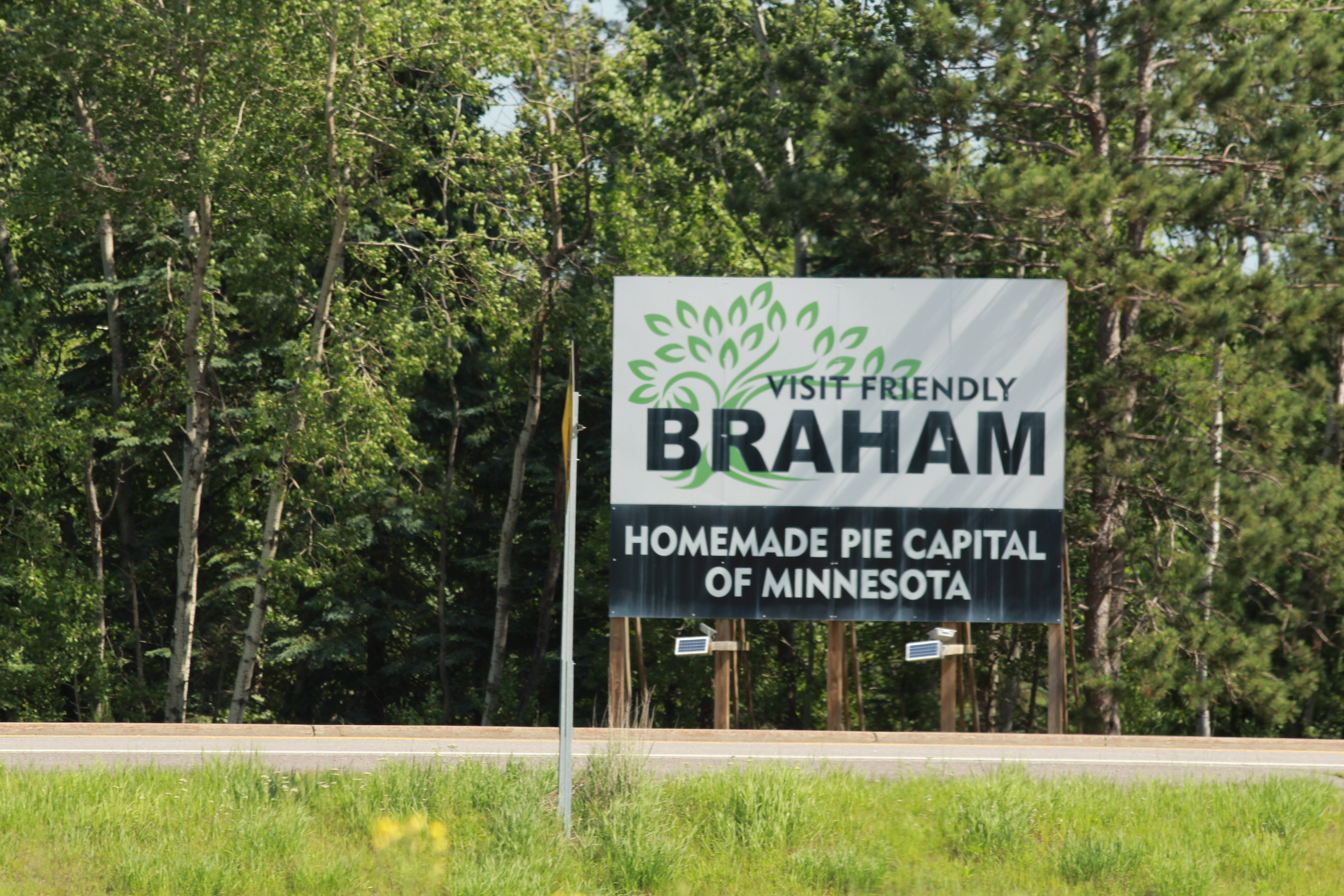
Welcome sign "Homemade Pie Capitol of Minnesota"
