= Minnesota State Highway 70 =

State highway in Minnesota, United States

Trunk Highway 70
- MN 70 highlighted in red

Route information
- Maintained by MnDOT
- Length: 29.333 mi (47.207 km)
- Existed: 1933–present

Major junctions
- West end: MN 65 at Brunswick
- MN 107 near Grasston; I-35 at Rock Creek
- East end: WIS 70 at the St. Croix River, near Grantsburg, WI

Location
- Country: United States
- State: Minnesota
- Counties: Kanabec, Pine

Highway system
- Minnesota Trunk Highway System; Interstate; US; State; Legislative; Scenic
← US 69	→ US 71

Minnesota State Highway 70 (MN 70) is a 29.333-mile-long (47.207 km) highway in east-central Minnesota, which runs from its intersection with State Highway 65 in Brunswick and continues east to its eastern terminus at the Wisconsin state line (near Grantsburg, WI), where it becomes Wisconsin Highway 70 upon crossing the St. Croix River.

== Route description ==
Highway 70 serves as an east–west route between Mora, Brunswick, Rock Creek, and Grantsburg, WI.

The route has an interchange with Interstate 35 at the city of Rock Creek.

Highway 70 in Minnesota is a narrow roadway. The connecting route in Wisconsin, Wisconsin Highway 70, is a wide roadway with large shoulders. Highway 70 in Minnesota carries a great amount of recreational traffic to Wisconsin, as Twin Cities residents try to avoid nearby U.S. Highway 8, which is often a traffic congested route.

The maximum speed limit across the entirety of Highway 70 is 55 mph.

== History ==
The route in Minnesota was numbered to correspond with Wisconsin Highway 70.

Minnesota 70 was authorized east of State Highway 107 (at Grasston / Braham) to the Wisconsin state line in 1933.

The portion of Highway 70 between State Highway 65 (at Brunswick) and State Highway 107 (at Grasston) was part of the original route of Highway 65 until c. 1942 when the current short-cut of Highway 65 was built.

Highway 70 in Minnesota was completely paved c. 1949.

== Major intersections ==
County	Location	mi	km	Destinations	Notes
Kanabec	Brunswick Township	0.000	0.000	MN 65 / CSAH 47 – Cambridge, Mora	
Kanabec	Brunswick Township	7.248	11.665	MN 107 north to MN 23	West end of MN 107 concurrency
Kanabec	Grass Lake Township	10.446	16.811	MN 107 south / CSAH 41 – Braham	East end of MN 107 concurrency
Pine	Rock Creek	18.668– 18.800	30.043– 30.256	I-35 – Duluth, Saint Paul, Minneapolis	Interchange
Pine	Rock Creek	19.841	31.931	CSAH 61 / Old US 61 / Truck MN 70 west	Former MN 361
Pine	Rock Creek	20.685	33.289	CSAH 70 / Truck MN 70 east	
Pine	Rock Creek	22.048	35.483	CSAH 4 / CR 106	Old Point Douglas to Superior Military Road
St. Croix River		29.398	47.311	Wisconsin state line	
St. Croix River		29.398	47.311	WIS 70 east – Grantsburg	Continuation into Wisconsin
1.000 mi = 1.609 km; 1.000 km = 0.621 mi: Concurrency terminus
