= Jimmy Gordon (politician) =

American politician (born 1987)

James "Jimmy" Gordon

Member of the Minnesota House of Representatives from the 28A district
- Incumbent
- Assumed office January 14, 2025
- Preceded by: Brian Johnson

Mayor of Isanti, Minnesota
- In office January 9, 2023 – December 31, 2024
- Preceded by: Jeff Johnson
- Succeeded by: Luke Merrill (interim)

Personal details
- Born: 1987 (age 38–39) Cambridge, Minnesota, U.S.
- Party: Republican
- Spouse: Megan
- Children: 4
- Occupation: Business owner; Mayor; Legislator

James "Jimmy" Gordon (born 1987) is an American politician serving since 2025 in the Minnesota House of Representatives. A member of the Republican Party of Minnesota, Gordon represents District 28A, which includes parts of North Branch, Cambridge, and Isanti in southeastern Minnesota. He previously served as the mayor of Isanti.

== Political career ==
=== Mayor of Isanti ===
Gordon was elected mayor of Isanti in 2022 with 55% of the vote, defeating incumbent Jeff Johnson. As mayor, he cast a tie-breaking vote to provide a special permit to open a CBD shop in the city. After being elected to the Minnesota House of Representatives in 2024, Gordon announced his resignation as mayor, effective December 31 of that year.

=== Minnesota House of Representatives ===
In January 2024, Gordon announced his intention to challenge incumbent Republican Brian Johnson in the primary for District 28A of the Minnesota House of Representatives. Despite reporting on his past tax deliquency during the primary campaign, he won the Republican endorsement, then defeated Johnson in the primary with 65.99% of the vote. He was the only challenger to successfully primary an incumbent in Minnesota in 2024.

In the general election, he defeated Democratic nominee Tim Dummer by nearly 37 points. He was sworn in at the start of session on January 14, 2025.

== Electoral history ==
2022 Isanti mayoral election
Candidate	Votes	%
James "Jimmy" Gordon	1,338	55.18
Jeff Johnson	1,077	44.41
Write-in	10	0.41
Total votes	2,425	100.0

2024 Minnesota State House - District 28A, Republican primary
Party	Candidate	Votes	%
Republican	Jimmy Gordon	2,561	65.99
Republican	Brian Johnson (incumbent)	1,320	34.01
Total votes		3,881	100

2024 Minnesota State House - District 28A
Party	Candidate	Votes	%
Republican	Jimmy Gordon	17,550	68.11
Democratic (DFL)	Tim Dummer	8,163	31.68
Write-in		54	0.21
Total votes		25,767	100
Republican hold			

== Personal life ==
Gordon was born in 1987 in Cambridge, Minnesota. He lives in Isanti with his wife, Megan, and four children and attends North Isanti Baptist Church.
