= Minnesota State Highway 322 =

State highway in Minnesota, United States

Trunk Highway 322
- Oak Street
- MN 322 highlighted in red

Route information
- Maintained by MnDOT
- Length: 0.13 mi (210 m)
- Existed: 1959–2001

Major junctions
- West end: MN 371 in Brainerd
- East end: MN 18 in Brainerd

Location
- Country: United States
- State: Minnesota

Highway system
- Minnesota Trunk Highway System; Interstate; US; State; Legislative; Scenic
| ← MN 318 | → MN 324 |

Minnesota State Highway 322 (MN 322) was a state highway in the city of Brainerd. It ran for two blocks along Oak Street providing a short connection between Minnesota State Highway 371 (now Highway 371 - Business) and Minnesota State Highway 18. It existed until after the completion of the Highway 371 Brainerd bypass in 2000, when it was turned back, along with portions of Highways 18 and 25, to local jurisdiction in order to compensate for the additional mileage of state highway resulting from the new bypass.

== Route description ==
Before the turnback of state highways resulting from the opening of the Brainerd bypass, Highway 18 ran west of its current terminus at Highway 25 along Oak Street to 8th Street. It then turned north and ran along 8th Street for just under a half mile to its former terminus at Highway 210. Highway 322 continued west on Oak Street from 8th Street for two blocks until Highway 371 (6th Street). The function of Highway 322 as a very short connecting route between the two highways led it to being the shortest Minnesota State Highway during its existence.

== History ==
Highway 322 was authorized in 1959. It was turned back to Brainerd city maintenance in 2001, along with the portion of Highway 18 running through the city.

== Major intersections ==
The entire route is in Brainerd, Crow Wing County.

| mi | km | Destinations | Notes |
|---|---|---|---|
| 0.00 | 0.00 | MN 371 | |
| 0.13 | 0.21 | MN 18 | |
1.000 mi = 1.609 km; 1.000 km = 0.621 mi
