= Minnesota State Highway 324 =

State highway in Minnesota, United States

Trunk Highway 324
- MN 324 highlighted in red

Route information
- Maintained by MnDOT
- Length: 0.762 mi (1,226 m)
- Existed: 1965–2003

Major junctions
- West end: I-35 near Pine City
- East end: MN 361 in Pine City

Location
- Country: United States
- State: Minnesota

Highway system
- Minnesota Trunk Highway System; Interstate; US; State; Legislative; Scenic
← MN 322	→ MN 329

Minnesota State Highway 324 (MN 324) was a highway in east-central Minnesota. It was a short spur route from Interstate 35 to Pine City. The route was turned back in 2003 and is now known as Pine County Road 7, which was already in existence west of Interstate 35 but was extended over the old route of Highway 324.

== Route description ==
Highway 324 was less than 1 mile in length, linking then-U.S. Highway 61 in Pine City to Interstate 35 (I-35) in Pine City Township. When the U.S. 61 designation was moved to I-35, the old highway became State Highway 361 to maintain Minnesota Constitutional Route 1 through Pine City. This made 324 part of the constitutional route as well, being the connection for that route to I-35.

In Pine City, the roadway is also known as Hillside Avenue SW.

The entire route was located in Pine County.

== History ==
Highway 324 was authorized in 1965. It was the only state highway administratively created under a law that authorized the Minnesota Department of Transportation to commission routes connecting cities to interstates at specified locations.

The route was eliminated in 2003 along with the northern portion of Highway 361. The road is now a continuation of County State-Aid Highway 7.

== Major intersections ==
The entire route is in Pine City, Pine County.

mi	km	Destinations	Notes
0.000	0.000	I-35 – Minneapolis, Duluth	Western terminus
0.762	1.226	MN 361 / CSAH 61	Eastern terminus
1.000 mi = 1.609 km; 1.000 km = 0.621 mi
