= Cambridge Christian School (Minnesota) =

Location
- 2211 Old South Main Street; Cambridge, MN 55008; United States
- Coordinates: 45.550482°N 93.22636°W

Information
- Type: Christian school
- Grades: PreK–12
- Color(s): Midnight Blue
- Website: link

Cambridge Christian School is a private preschool and K–12 Christian school in Cambridge, Minnesota.
