= Grasston, Minnesota =

City in Minnesota, United States

Grasston
- City
- Location of Grasston, Minnesota
- Coordinates: 45°47′45″N 93°09′09″W
- Country: United States
- State: Minnesota
- County: Kanabec

Area
  - Total: 0.97 sq mi (2.51 km^{2})
  - Land: 0.93 sq mi (2.42 km^{2})
  - Water: 0.035 sq mi (0.09 km^{2})
- Elevation: 968 ft (295 m)

Population (2020)
  - Total: 154
  - Density: 165/sq mi (63.7/km^{2})
  - Demonym: Grasstonian
- Time zone: UTC-6 (Central (CST))
  - Summer (DST): UTC-5 (CDT)
- FIPS code: 27-25424
- GNIS feature ID: 2394967
- Website: https://cityofgrasstonmn.com/

Grasston is a city in Kanabec County, Minnesota, United States. As of the 2020 census, Grasston had a population of 154.

== History ==
A post office called Grasston has been in operation since 1899. The city derives its name from Grass Lake.

== Geography ==
According to the United States Census Bureau, the city has a total area of 0.95 square miles (2.46 km^{2}), of which 0.91 square miles (2.36 km^{2}) is land and 0.04 square miles (0.10 km^{2}) is water.

Minnesota State Highways 70 and 107 are the main routes in the community.

The Snake River flows nearby.

== Demographics ==
Historical population
Census	Pop.	Note	%±
1910	189		—
1920	239		26.5%
1930	229		−4.2%
1940	144		−37.1%
1950	154		6.9%
1960	146		−5.2%
1970	132		−9.6%
1980	123		−6.8%
1990	119		−3.3%
2000	105		−11.8%
2010	158		50.5%
2020	154		−2.5%
U.S. Decennial Census

=== 2010 census ===
As of the census of 2010, there were 158 people, 53 households, and 41 families living in the city. The population density was 173.6 inhabitants per square mile (67.0/km^{2}). There were 63 housing units at an average density of 69.2 per square mile (26.7/km^{2}). The racial makeup of the city was 98.1% White, 0.6% African American, 0.6% from other races, and 0.6% from two or more races. Hispanic or Latino of any race were 1.3% of the population.

There were 53 households, of which 47.2% had children under the age of 18 living with them, 62.3% were married couples living together, 9.4% had a female householder with no husband present, 5.7% had a male householder with no wife present, and 22.6% were non-families. 18.9% of all households were made up of individuals, and 5.7% had someone living alone who was 65 years of age or older. The average household size was 2.98 and the average family size was 3.32.

The median age in the city was 34 years. 29.1% of residents were under the age of 18; 7.7% were between the ages of 18 and 24; 27.8% were from 25 to 44; 24.1% were from 45 to 64; and 11.4% were 65 years of age or older. The gender makeup of the city was 51.3% male and 48.7% female.

=== 2000 census ===
As of the census of 2000, there were 105 people, 42 households, and 32 families living in the city. The population density was 110.5 inhabitants per square mile (42.7/km^{2}). There were 46 housing units at an average density of 48.4 per square mile (18.7/km^{2}). The racial makeup of the city was 98.10% White and 1.90% Native American.

There were 42 households, out of which 33.3% had children under the age of 18 living with them, 54.8% were married couples living together, 16.7% had a female householder with no husband present, and 23.8% were non-families. 19.0% of all households were made up of individuals, and 9.5% had someone living alone who was 65 years of age or older. The average household size was 2.50 and the average family size was 2.78.

In the city, the population was spread out, with 21.9% under the age of 18, 13.3% from 18 to 24, 28.6% from 25 to 44, 22.9% from 45 to 64, and 13.3% who were 65 years of age or older. The median age was 35 years. For every 100 females, there were 114.3 males. For every 100 females age 18 and over, there were 105.0 males.

The median income for a household in the city was $41,250, and the median income for a family was $48,333. Males had a median income of $43,125 versus $23,250 for females. The per capita income for the city was $16,306. There were 13.3% of families and 8.0% of the population living below the poverty line, including 4.8% of under eighteens and 71.4% of those over 64.
