= Robert C. Becklin =

American politician

Member of the Minnesota House of Representatives
- In office 1963–1972

Personal details
- Born: May 17, 1926 Braham, Minnesota, U.S.
- Died: August 10, 2012 (aged 86) Cambridge, Minnesota, U.S.

Robert C. Becklin (May 17, 1926 – August 10, 2012) was an American businessman and politician.

Becklin was born in Braham, Minnesota. He lived in Cambridge, Minnesota and graduated from Cambridge High School. Becklin served in the United States Army during World War II. He worked for the United States Postal Service as a clerk and letter carrier. Becklin was also involved with the banking and charcoal businesses. Becklin served in the Minnesota House of Representatives from 1963 to 1972 and was a Republican. He died in Cambridge, Minnesota.
