= Rush City Regional Airport =

Airport in Minnesota, U.S.

- IATA: none; ICAO: KROS; FAA LID: ROS

Summary
- Airport type: Public
- Owner: City of Rush City
- Serves: Rush City, Minnesota / Pine City, Minnesota
- Elevation AMSL: 925 ft / 282 m
- Coordinates: 45°42′12″N 092°58′26″W

Map
- Location of airport in Minnesota/United States ROS (the United States)

Runways
Direction	Length		Surface
Direction	ft	m	Surface
16/34	4,397	1,340	Asphalt
- Sources: Minnesota DOT, FAA

Rush City Regional Airport (ICAO: KROS, FAA LID: ROS) is a city-owned public-use airport located in Chisago County, Minnesota, one nautical mile northeast of the central business district of Rush City, a city in Chisago County, Minnesota, United States.

== Facilities and aircraft ==
Rush City Regional Airport covers an area of 156 acres (63 ha) at an elevation of 925 feet (282 m) above mean sea level. It has one runway designated 16/34 with an asphalt surface measuring 4,397 by 75 feet (1,340 x 23 m). The FBO at the field is Hawk Aviation, Inc., where there is flight training, aircraft rental, a CATS testing center, vending services, and a pilot shop.

== See also ==
- List of airports in Minnesota
