= Rush City, Minnesota =

City in Minnesota, United States

Rush City
- City
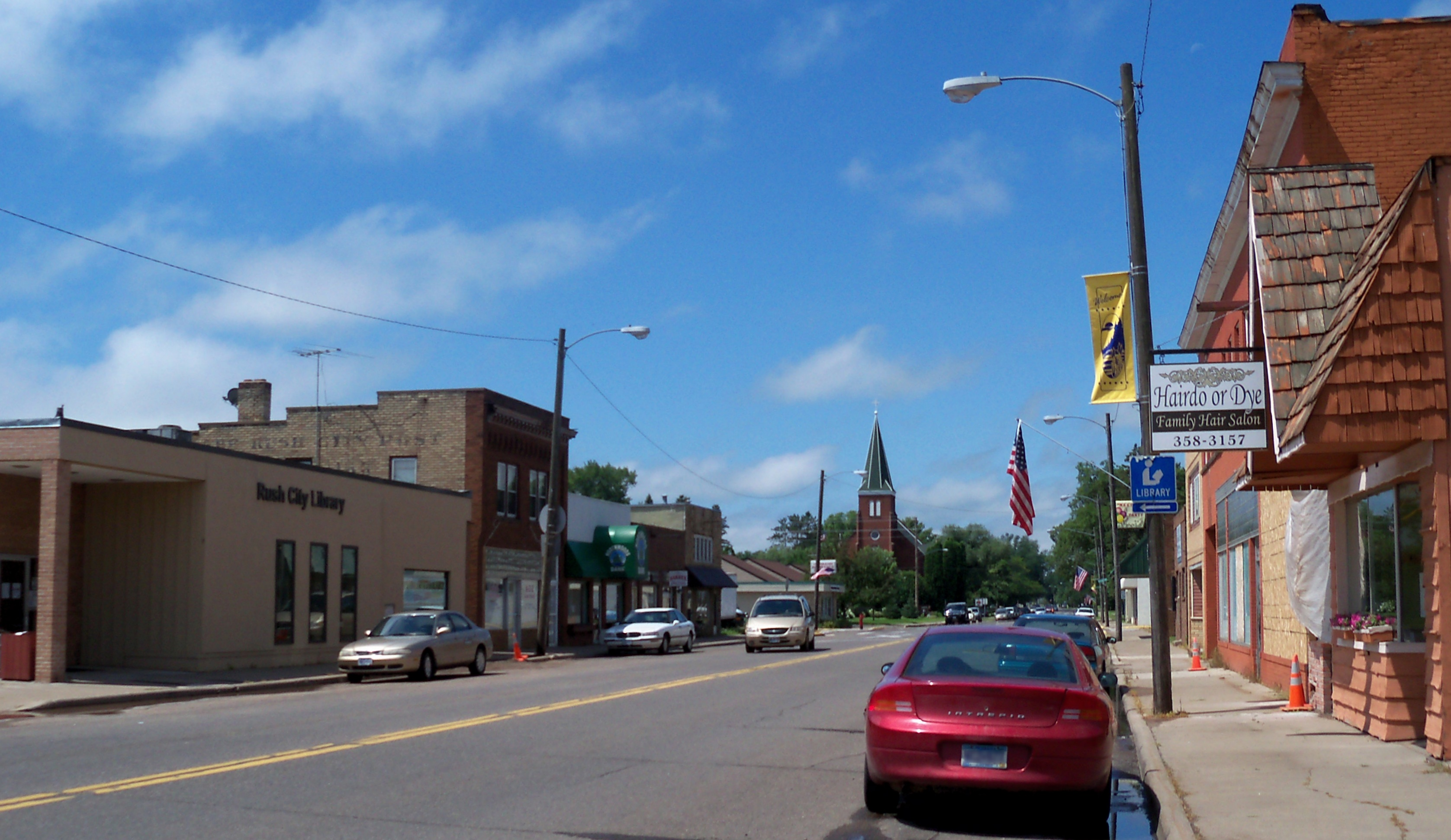
- Downtown Rush City

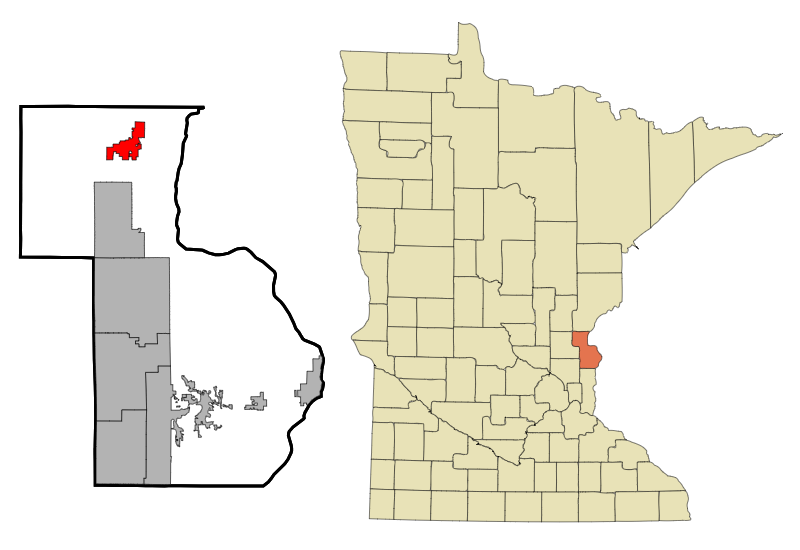
- Location of Rush City within Chisago County, Minnesota
- Coordinates: 45°41′7″N 92°58′7″W
- Country: United States
- State: Minnesota
- County: Chisago

Government
  - Mayor: Alan Johnson

Area
  - Total: 4.32 sq mi (11.19 km^{2})
  - Land: 4.25 sq mi (11.01 km^{2})
  - Water: 0.069 sq mi (0.18 km^{2})
- Elevation: 919 ft (280 m)

Population (2020)
  - Total: 3,228
  - Density: 759.6/sq mi (293.28/km^{2})
- Time zone: UTC-6 (Central (CST))
  - Summer (DST): UTC-5 (CDT)
- ZIP code: 55069
- Area code: 320
- FIPS code: 27-56266
- GNIS feature ID: 665486
- Website: www.rushcitymn.us

Rush City is a city in Chisago County, Minnesota, United States. The population was 3,228 at the 2020 census. It is 93 kilometers (58 miles) north of Minneapolis–Saint Paul.

== History ==
Rush City was platted in 1870 and incorporated in 1874.

== Geography ==
According to the United States Census Bureau, the city has an area of 4.32 square miles (11.19 km^{2}), of which 4.25 square miles (11.01 km^{2}) is land and 0.07 square miles (0.18 km^{2}) is water.

Rush City is along Rush Creek.

== Transportation ==
Interstate 35 serves as a main route for the community. Other main routes include Minnesota State Highway 361 (4th Street). Rush City is served by the Rush City Regional Airport.

== Demographics ==
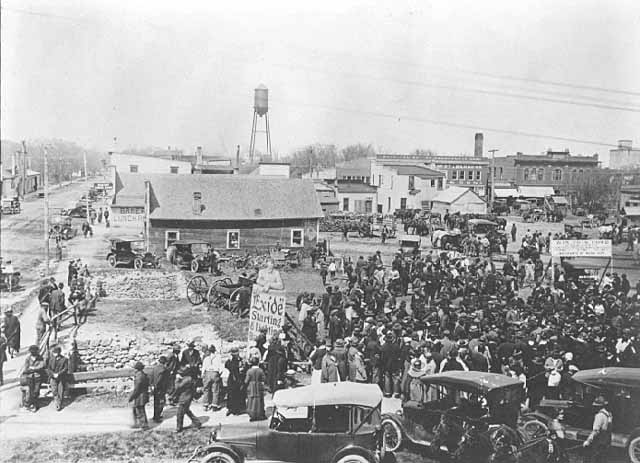
Rush City, Market Day, 1922

Historical population
Census	Pop.	Note	%±
1880	580		—
1890	707		21.9%
1900	987		39.6%
1910	964		−2.3%
1920	971		0.7%
1930	908		−6.5%
1940	1,020		12.3%
1950	1,175		15.2%
1960	1,108		−5.7%
1970	1,130		2.0%
1980	1,198		6.0%
1990	1,497		25.0%
2000	2,112		41.1%
2010	3,079		45.8%
2020	3,228		4.8%
U.S. Decennial Census

=== 2020 census ===
As of the 2020 census, Rush City had a population of 3,228. The median age was 35.4 years. 16.7% of residents were under the age of 18 and 11.2% of residents were 65 years of age or older. For every 100 females there were 176.8 males, and for every 100 females age 18 and over there were 202.9 males age 18 and over.

0.0% of residents lived in urban areas, while 100.0% lived in rural areas.

There were 930 households in Rush City, of which 31.3% had children under the age of 18 living in them. Of all households, 35.6% were married-couple households, 20.8% were households with a male householder and no spouse or partner present, and 31.2% were households with a female householder and no spouse or partner present. About 32.4% of all households were made up of individuals and 11.1% had someone living alone who was 65 years of age or older.

There were 989 housing units, of which 6.0% were vacant. The homeowner vacancy rate was 1.1% and the rental vacancy rate was 7.1%.

Racial composition as of the 2020 census
Race	Number	Percent
White	2,414	74.8%
Black or African American	530	16.4%
American Indian and Alaska Native	109	3.4%
Asian	11	0.3%
Native Hawaiian and Other Pacific Islander	2	0.1%
Some other race	15	0.5%
Two or more races	147	4.6%
Hispanic or Latino (of any race)	132	4.1%

=== 2010 census ===
As of the census of 2010, there were 3,079 people, 844 households, and 524 families living in the city. The population density was 724.5 inhabitants per square mile (279.7/km^{2}). There were 908 housing units at an average density of 213.6 per square mile (82.5/km^{2}). The racial makeup of the city was 80.5% White, 13.2% African American, 4.0% Native American, 1.3% Asian, 0.1% from other races, and 0.8% from two or more races. Hispanic or Latino of any race were 2.5% of the population.

There were 844 households, of which 35.1% had children under the age of 18 living with them, 40.8% were married couples living together, 15.8% had a female householder with no husband present, 5.6% had a male householder with no wife present, and 37.9% were non-families. 30.7% of all households were made up of individuals, and 12.8% had someone living alone who was 65 years of age or older. The average household size was 2.43 and the average family size was 3.01.

The median age in the city was 33.6 years. 17.8% of residents were under the age of 18; 12.3% were between the ages of 18 and 24; 37.9% were from 25 to 44; 21.8% were from 45 to 64; and 10.1% were 65 years of age or older. The gender makeup of the city was 64.9% male and 35.1% female.

=== 2000 census ===
As of the census of 2000, there were 2,112 people, 705 households, and 461 families living in the city. The population density was 689.6 inhabitants per square mile (266.3/km^{2}). There were 724 housing units at an average density of 237.5 per square mile (91.7/km^{2}). The racial makeup of the city was 90.10% White, 4.66% African American, 1.33% Native American, 1.24% Asian, 0.05% Pacific Islander, 1.24% from other races, and 1.38% from two or more races. Hispanic or Latino of any race were 3.04% of the population.

There were 705 households, out of which 39.4% had children under the age of 18 living with them, 45.0% were married couples living together, 14.9% had a female householder with no husband present, and 34.5% were non-families. 28.5% of all households were made up of individuals, and 13.5% had someone living alone who was 65 years of age or older. The average household size was 2.54 and the average family size was 3.06.

In the city, the population was spread out, with 26.3% under the age of 18, 11.9% from 18 to 24, 33.9% from 25 to 44, 14.2% from 45 to 64, and 13.7% who were 65 years of age or older. The median age was 32 years. For every 100 females, there were 120.6 males. For every 100 females age 18 and over, there were 120.5 males.

The median income for a household in the city was $41,466, and the median income for a family was $40,380. Males had a median income of $31,750 versus $21,813 for females. The per capita income for the city was $14,668. About 10.2% of families and 11.6% of the population were below the poverty line, including 16.6% of those under age 18 and 10.6% of those age 65 or over.

== Economy ==
Rush City is the location of a state prison that houses just under 1000 male inmates. Minnesota's newest state prison, it opened in 2000 and employs about 350 people.

== Notable people ==
- Ruth Duccini (1918-2014), actress, munchkin in The Wizard of Oz. Born in Rush City.
- Deona Knajdek (1989-2021), social justice activist killed during a protest in Minneapolis.
- Clayton Tonnemaker (1928-1996), American football player

== Gallery ==
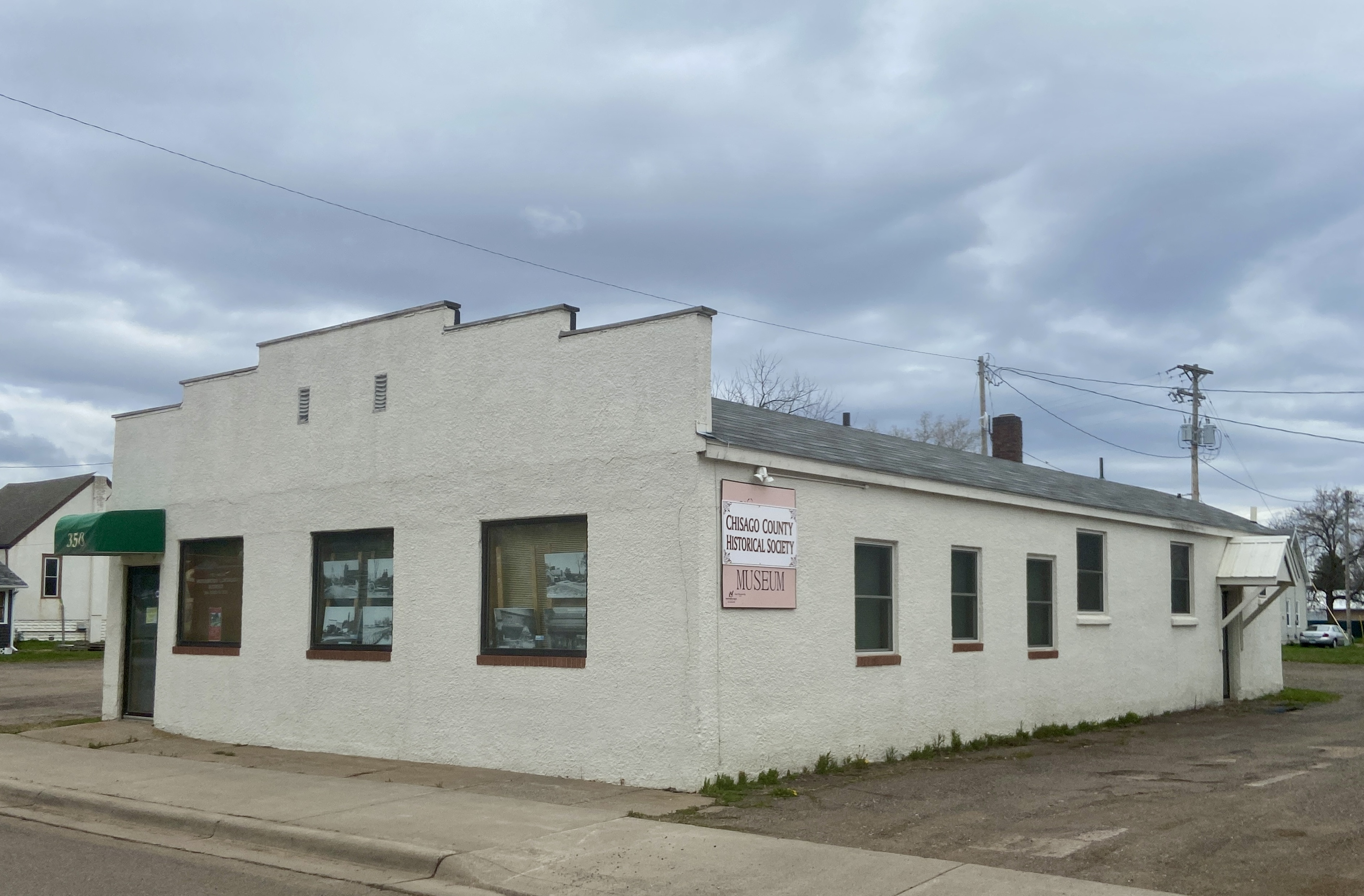
Rush City Museum

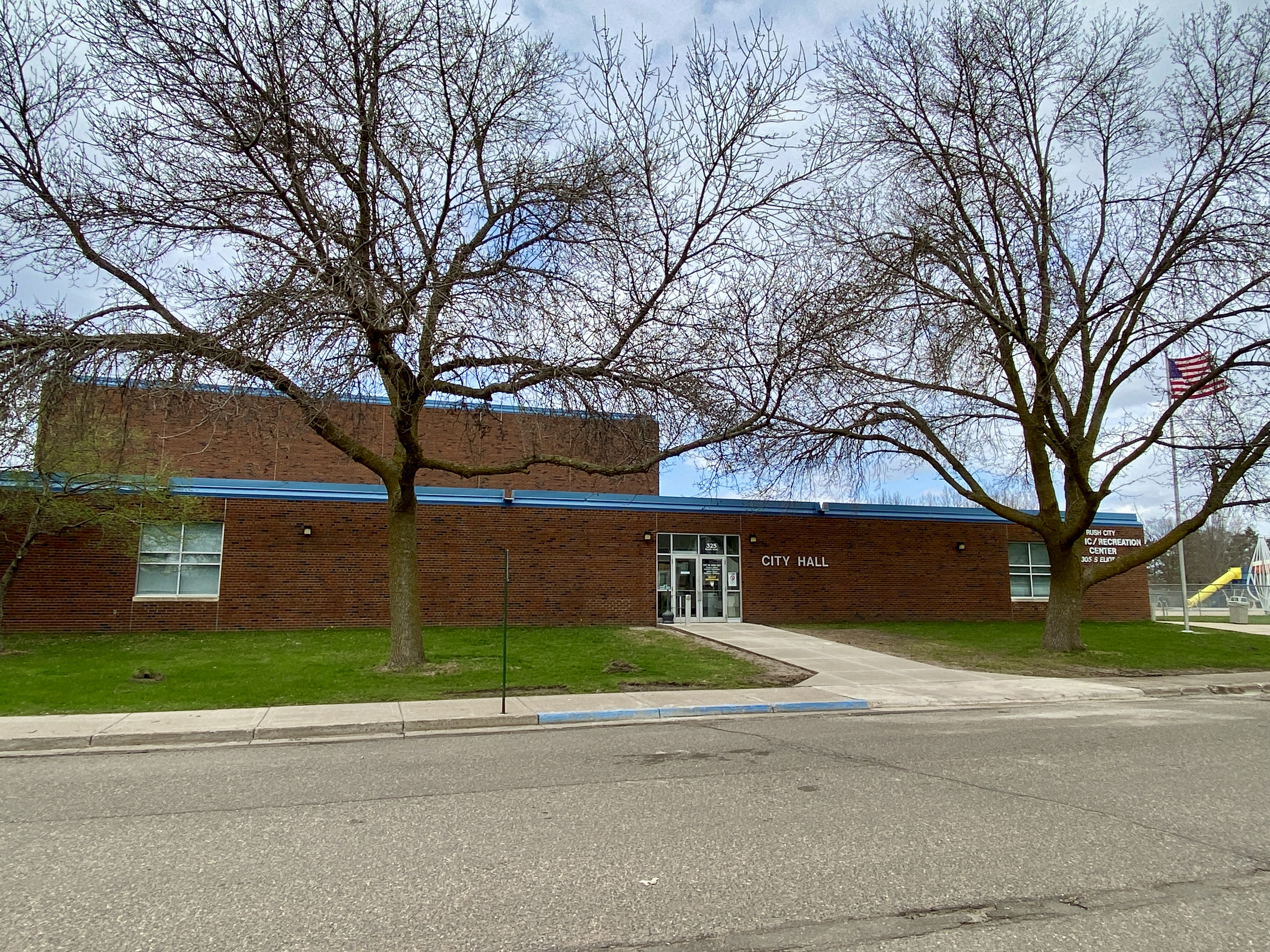
City Hall

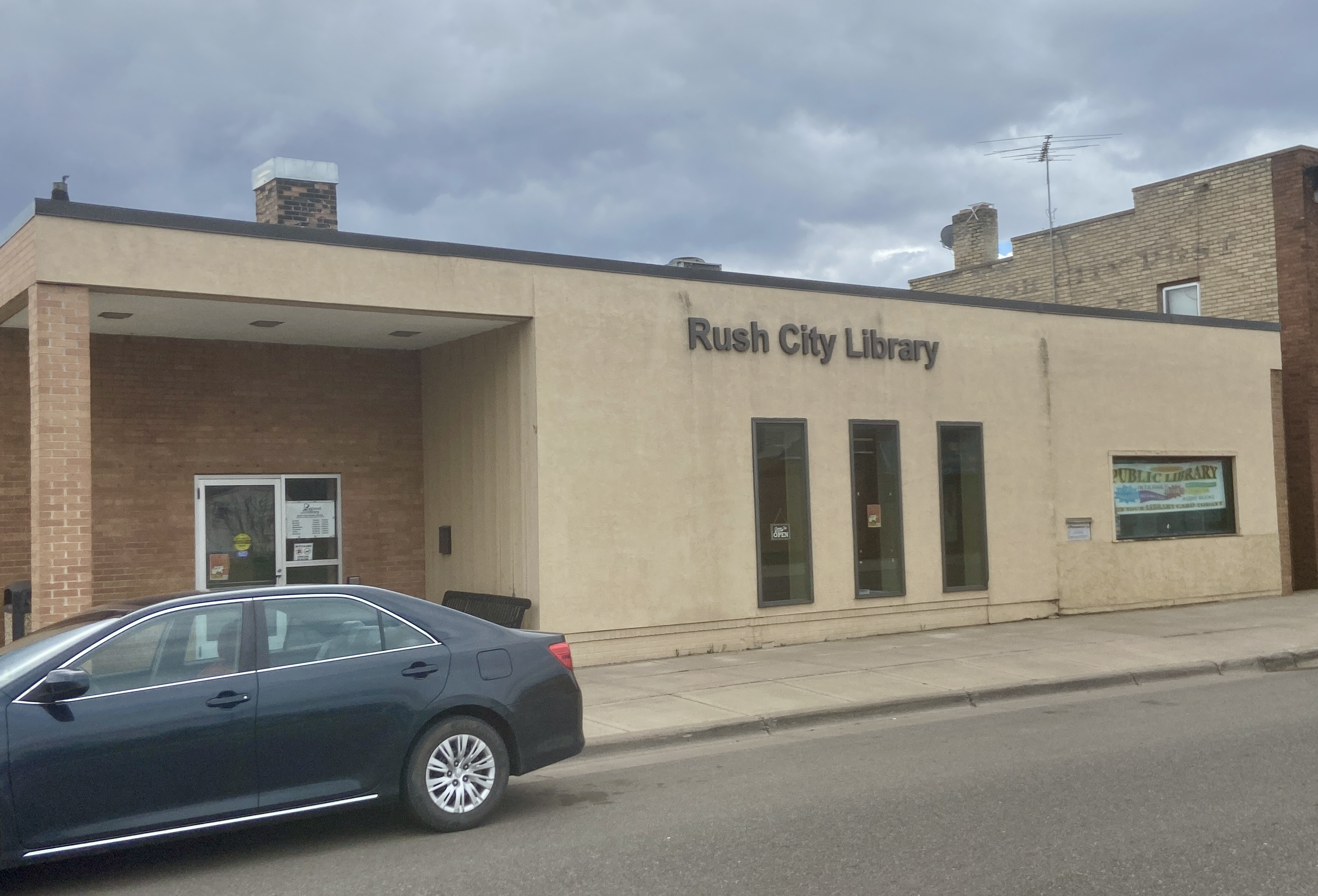
Library

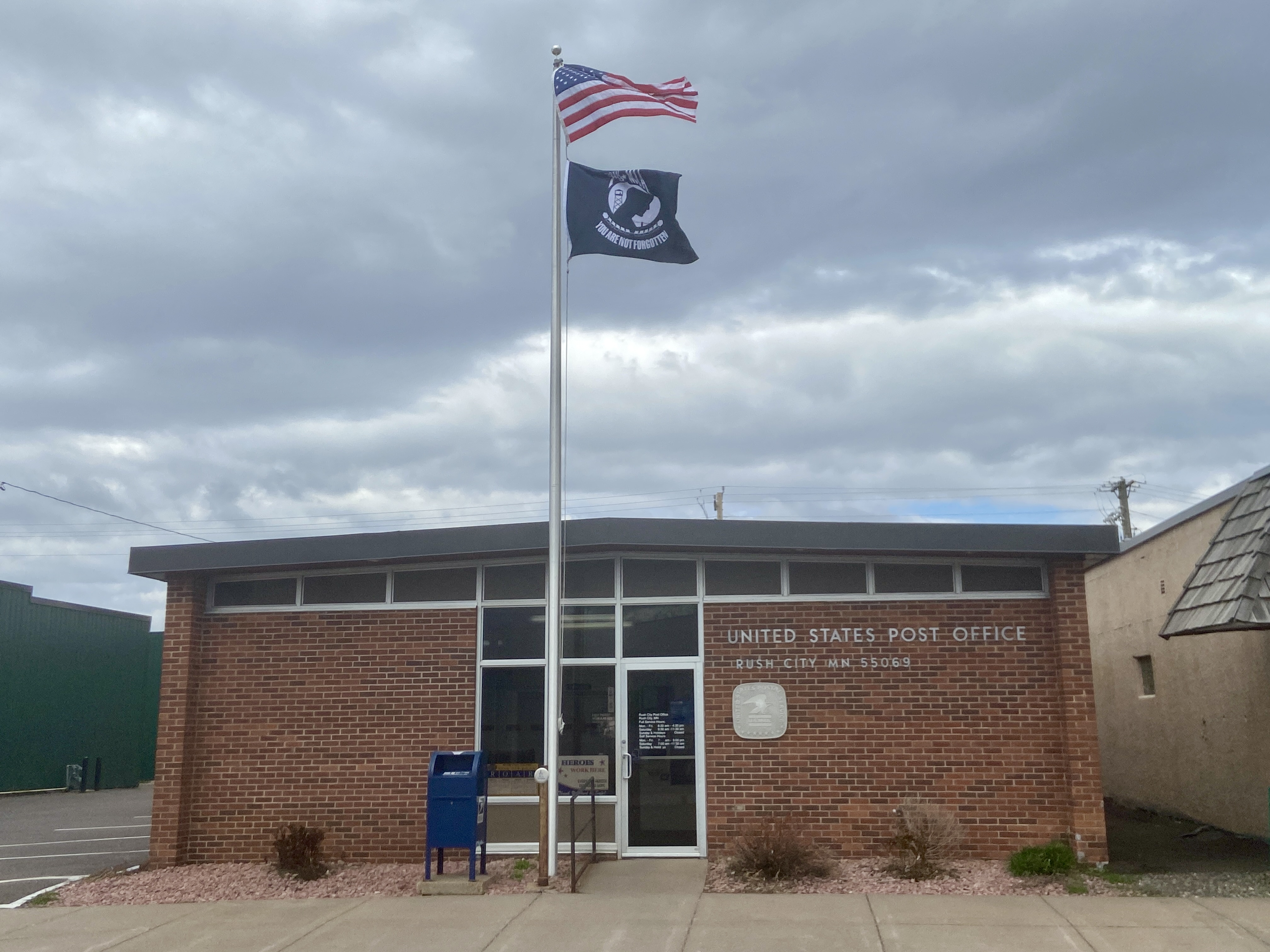
United States Post Office

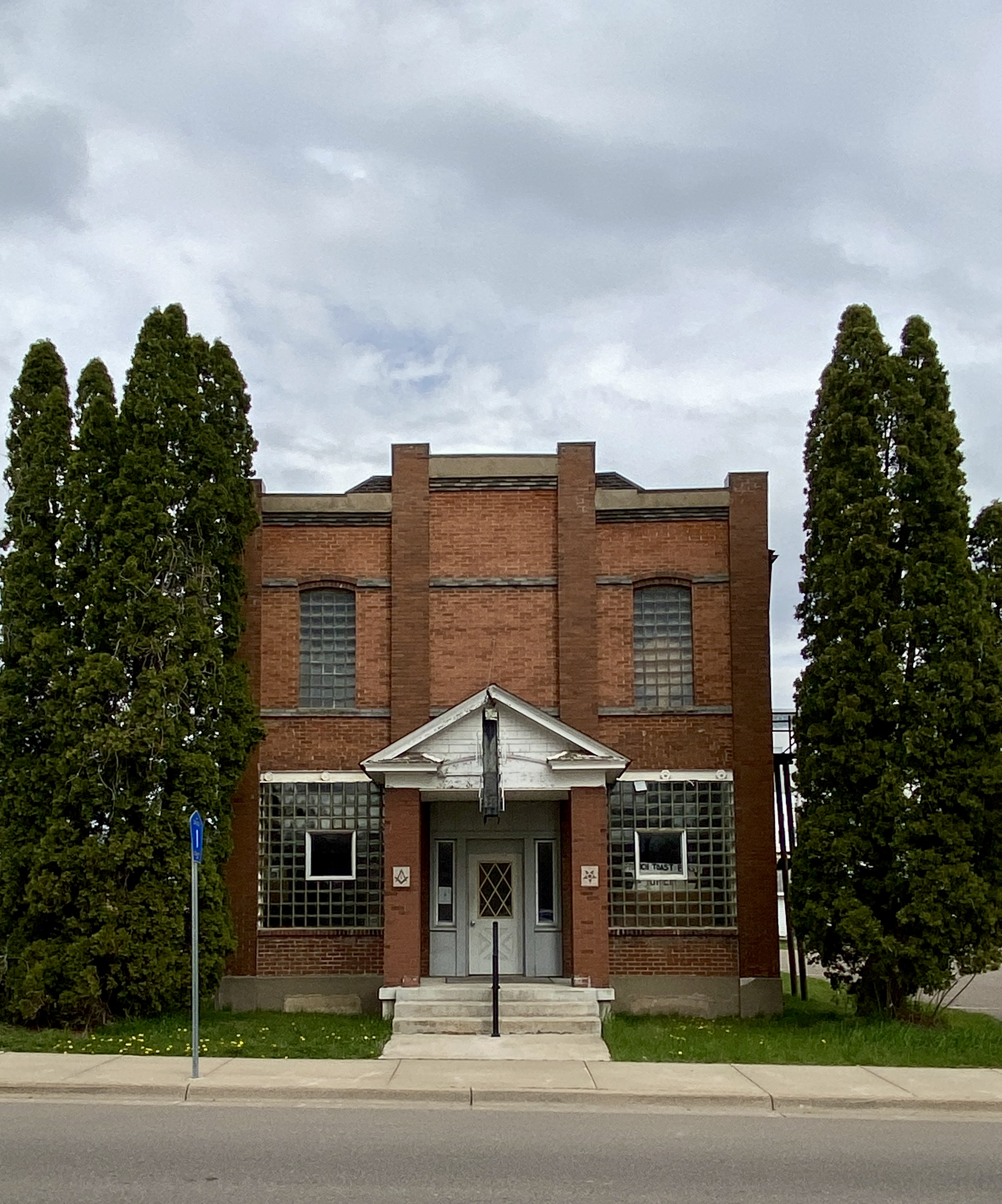
Jasper Masonic Lodge #164

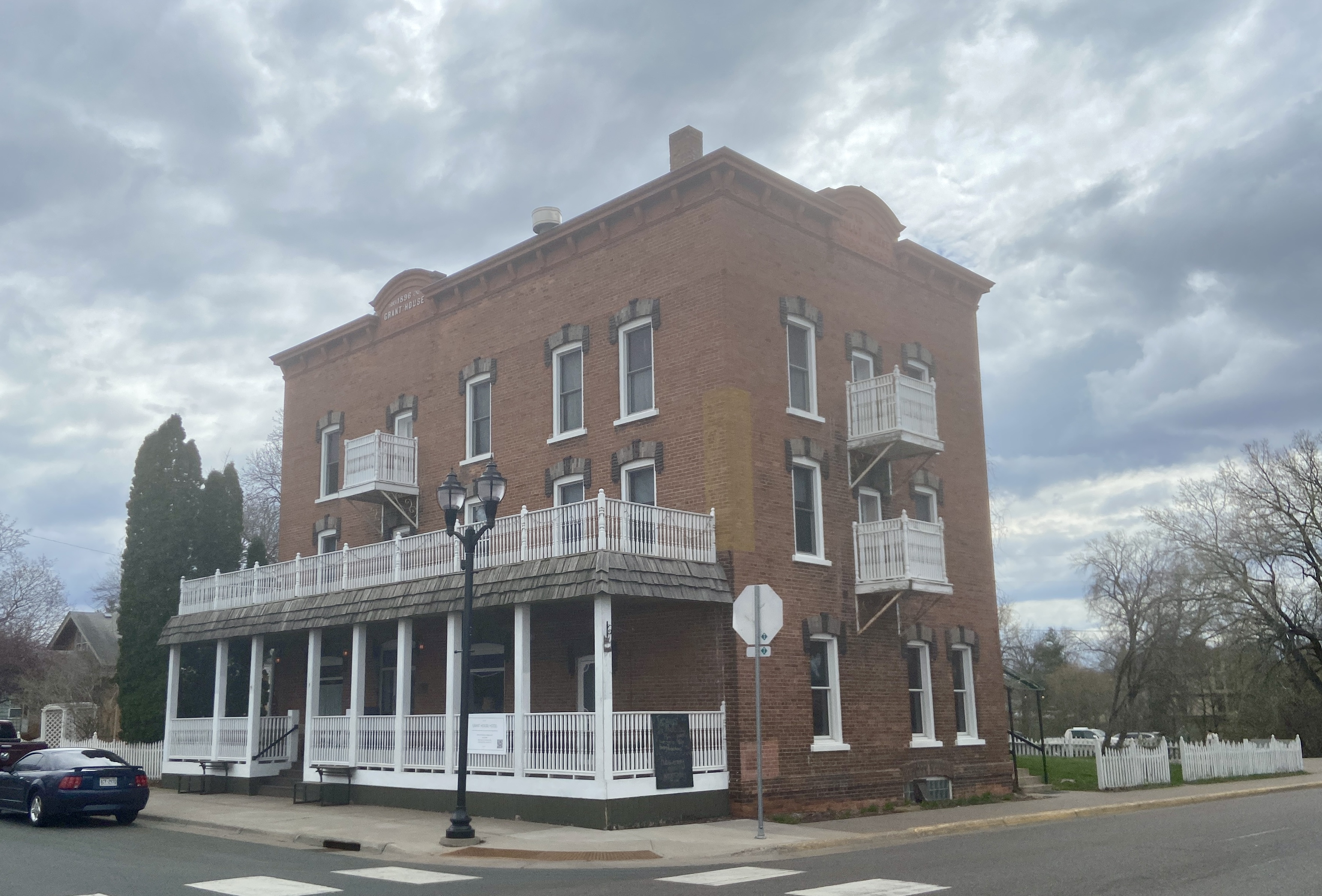
Grant House Hotel
