= Lynn H. Becklin =

American politician

Member of the Minnesota House of Representatives
- In office 1973–1974
- In office 1985–1986

Personal details
- Born: September 1, 1932 (age 93) Cambridge, Isanti County, Minnesota
- Party: Republican
- Education: Bachelor's degree from the University of Minnesota School of Management
- Alma mater: University of Minnesota

Lynn H. Becklin (born September 1, 1932) was an American politician.

Becklin was born in Cambridge, Isanti County, Minnesota and graduated from Cambridge High School. He served in the United States Air Force, during the Vietnam War, and was commissioned a lieutenant colonel. Becklin received his bachelor's degree from the University of Minnesota School of Management. He served in the Minnesota House of Representatives in 1973 and 1974 and in 1985 and 1986. Becklin was a Republican.
