= Cambridge, Minnesota =

City in Minnesota, United States

Cambridge
- City
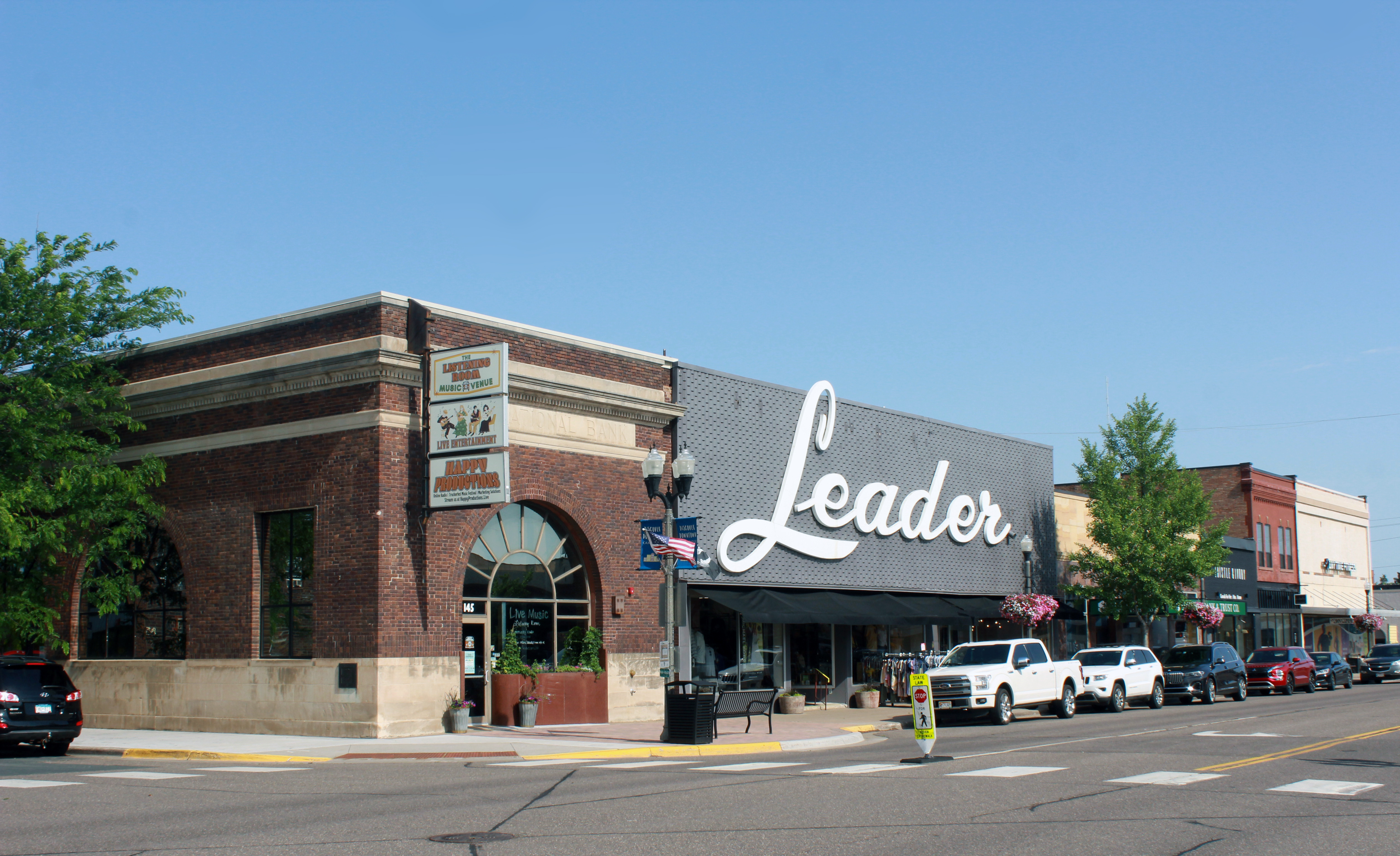
- Commercial businesses on Main Street
- Nickname: "Minnesota's Opportunity Community"
- Interactive map of Cambridge
- Coordinates: 45°33′35″N 93°13′55″W
- Country: United States
- State: Minnesota
- County: Isanti
- Founded: 1866
- Incorporated: 1877

Government
  - Mayor: Jim Godfrey

Area
  - Total: 7.76 sq mi (20.11 km^{2})
  - Land: 7.48 sq mi (19.37 km^{2})
  - Water: 0.29 sq mi (0.74 km^{2})
- Elevation: 965 ft (294 m)

Population (2020)
  - Total: 9,611
  - Estimate (2023): 10,509
  - Density: 1,284.9/sq mi (496.12/km^{2})
- Time zone: UTC-6 (CST)
  - Summer (DST): UTC-5 (CDT)
- ZIP code: 55008
- Area code: 763
- FIPS code: 27-09370
- GNIS feature ID: 2393505
- Website: ci.cambridge.mn.us

Cambridge is a city in Isanti County, Minnesota, United States, located at the junction of Minnesota State Highways 65 and 95. The population was 9,611 at the 2020 census. It is the county seat of Isanti County. It is located along the Rum River and BNSF's Hinckley Subdivision. Cambridge is notable for having the highest percentage of Swedish Americans of any city in the United States with a population of over 5,000 people.

== History ==
The city of Cambridge was established in the late 19th century along the railroad from Minneapolis to Duluth. It was named by, and originally settled by, immigrants from New England. These were settlers who were descended from the English Puritans who settled New England during the colonial era. The same population founded and named the town of Princeton nearby. Later on the surrounding area would be heavily populated with Swedish, and German, immigrants.

The city of Cambridge was incorporated in 1877.

In the early 20th century, Cambridge had a potato starch factory, a 1,301-barrel flour mill, a wool carding and spinning mill, an electric lighting plant, and local and long-distance telephone systems.

The Cambridge station served passenger trains until 1985.

== Geography ==
According to the United States Census Bureau, the city has a total area of 7.68 square miles (19.89 km^{2}), of which 7.46 square miles (19.32 km^{2}) is land and 0.22 square miles (0.57 km^{2}) is water.

The Rum River flows north to south through the middle of Cambridge. Camping, canoeing, and fishing are popular attractions of the Rum River.

=== Major highways ===
The following routes are located within the city of Cambridge.

- Minnesota State Highway 65
- Minnesota State Highway 95

== Climate ==
Cambridge has a warm-summer humid continental climate, with the average July temperature being just below the isotherm for the hot-summer subtype. Temperature differences between summer and winters are large, typical of the Upper Midwest. Spring and fall are rather short due to the extreme warming and cooling off depending on daylight hours. Winter is relatively long and cold, but cools off later and heats up earlier than more northerly areas of the state. The warm to hot summers are also typical of central Minnesota and tend to bring more precitipation than during winter. June is the wettest month with 108 millimetres (4.3 in) on average. The dry winter contributes to snowfall on average being limited to 104.7 centimetres (41.2 in).

Climate data for Cambridge, Minnesota (1991–2020 normals, extremes 1893–1897, 1932–present)
Month	Jan	Feb	Mar	Apr	May	Jun	Jul	Aug	Sep	Oct	Nov	Dec	Year
Record high °F (°C)	53 (12)	61 (16)	79 (26)	92 (33)	107 (42)	104 (40)	109 (43)	102 (39)	99 (37)	90 (32)	75 (24)	62 (17)	109 (43)
Mean maximum °F (°C)	39.3 (4.1)	44.2 (6.8)	59.8 (15.4)	74.8 (23.8)	85.4 (29.7)	89.9 (32.2)	89.8 (32.1)	88.8 (31.6)	84.9 (29.4)	76.4 (24.7)	58.1 (14.5)	43.2 (6.2)	92.8 (33.8)
Mean daily maximum °F (°C)	21.9 (−5.6)	27.1 (−2.7)	40.4 (4.7)	56.0 (13.3)	68.8 (20.4)	77.4 (25.2)	81.8 (27.7)	79.8 (26.6)	71.5 (21.9)	57.7 (14.3)	41.1 (5.1)	26.9 (−2.8)	54.2 (12.3)
Daily mean °F (°C)	12.7 (−10.7)	17.2 (−8.2)	30.1 (−1.1)	44.8 (7.1)	57.3 (14.1)	67.0 (19.4)	71.3 (21.8)	68.9 (20.5)	60.5 (15.8)	47.4 (8.6)	32.9 (0.5)	19.1 (−7.2)	44.1 (6.7)
Mean daily minimum °F (°C)	3.6 (−15.8)	7.3 (−13.7)	19.9 (−6.7)	33.5 (0.8)	45.7 (7.6)	56.5 (13.6)	60.7 (15.9)	58.1 (14.5)	49.5 (9.7)	37.2 (2.9)	24.7 (−4.1)	11.2 (−11.6)	34.0 (1.1)
Mean minimum °F (°C)	−20.5 (−29.2)	−14.2 (−25.7)	−3.5 (−19.7)	18.8 (−7.3)	32.4 (0.2)	41.7 (5.4)	48.7 (9.3)	47.5 (8.6)	33.1 (0.6)	22.2 (−5.4)	5.7 (−14.6)	−14.3 (−25.7)	−23.0 (−30.6)
Record low °F (°C)	−42 (−41)	−41 (−41)	−33 (−36)	0 (−18)	18 (−8)	32 (0)	40 (4)	32 (0)	19 (−7)	8 (−13)	−22 (−30)	−41 (−41)	−42 (−41)
Average precipitation inches (mm)	0.74 (19)	0.72 (18)	1.38 (35)	2.71 (69)	3.59 (91)	4.20 (107)	4.22 (107)	3.63 (92)	3.07 (78)	2.80 (71)	1.61 (41)	0.99 (25)	29.66 (753)
Average snowfall inches (cm)	5.4 (14)	10.0 (25)	7.4 (19)	4.0 (10)	0.0 (0.0)	0.0 (0.0)	0.0 (0.0)	0.0 (0.0)	0.0 (0.0)	0.5 (1.3)	4.5 (11)	12.3 (31)	44.1 (112)
Average extreme snow depth inches (cm)	9.3 (24)	11.3 (29)	10.4 (26)	2.8 (7.1)	0.0 (0.0)	0.0 (0.0)	0.0 (0.0)	0.0 (0.0)	0.0 (0.0)	0.4 (1.0)	5.6 (14)	7.7 (20)	16.8 (43)
Average precipitation days (≥ 0.01 in)	4.5	3.5	4.9	6.9	9.2	9.7	8.8	7.6	6.8	6.9	5.2	5.2	79.2
Average snowy days (≥ 0.1 in)	3.3	2.4	1.9	1.0	0.0	0.0	0.0	0.0	0.0	0.2	1.9	4.2	14.9
Source: NOAA

== Demographics ==
Historical population
Census	Pop.	Note	%±
1880	136		—
1890	258		89.7%
1900	737		185.7%
1910	900		22.1%
1920	1,080		20.0%
1930	1,183		9.5%
1940	1,592		34.6%
1950	1,790		12.4%
1960	2,728		52.4%
1970	2,720		−0.3%
1980	3,287		20.8%
1990	5,094		55.0%
2000	5,520		8.4%
2010	8,111		46.9%
2020	9,611		18.5%
2021 (est.)	9,915		3.2%
U.S. Decennial Census; 2020 Census

=== 2020 census ===
As of the 2020 census, Cambridge had a population of 9,611. The median age was 37.6 years. 25.6% of residents were under the age of 18 and 20.1% of residents were 65 years of age or older. For every 100 females there were 87.2 males, and for every 100 females age 18 and over there were 83.1 males age 18 and over.

98.2% of residents lived in urban areas, while 1.8% lived in rural areas.

There were 3,805 households in Cambridge, of which 31.9% had children under the age of 18 living in them. Of all households, 41.3% were married-couple households, 16.0% were households with a male householder and no spouse or partner present, and 33.3% were households with a female householder and no spouse or partner present. About 32.5% of all households were made up of individuals and 17.2% had someone living alone who was 65 years of age or older.

There were 3,988 housing units, of which 4.6% were vacant. The homeowner vacancy rate was 1.0% and the rental vacancy rate was 6.6%.

Racial composition as of the 2020 census
Race	Number	Percent
White	8,668	90.2%
Black or African American	137	1.4%
American Indian and Alaska Native	85	0.9%
Asian	165	1.7%
Native Hawaiian and Other Pacific Islander	5	0.1%
Some other race	77	0.8%
Two or more races	474	4.9%
Hispanic or Latino (of any race)	241	2.5%

=== 2010 census ===
As of the census of 2010, there were 8,111 people, 3,137 households, and 1,967 families living in the city. The population density was 1,087.3 inhabitants per square mile (419.8/km^{2}). There were 3,426 housing units at an average density of 459.2 per square mile (177.3/km^{2}). The racial makeup of the city was 94.5% White, 1.0% African American, 0.5% Native American, 1.4% Asian, 0.5% from other races, and 2.1% from two or more races. Hispanic or Latino of any race were 1.7% of the population.

There were 3,137 households, of which 35.1% had children under the age of 18 living with them, 45.3% were married couples living together, 12.5% had a female householder with no husband present, 4.9% had a male householder with no wife present, and 37.3% were non-families. 31.6% of all households were made up of individuals, and 15.5% had someone living alone who was 65 years of age or older. The average household size was 2.47 and the average family size was 3.08.

The median age in the city was 34.1 years. 26.6% of residents were under the age of 18; 8.9% were between the ages of 18 and 24; 27.5% were from 25 to 44; 19.5% were from 45 to 64; and 17.5% were 65 years of age or older. The gender makeup of the city was 47.4% male and 52.6% female.

=== 2000 census ===
As of the census of 2000, there were 5,520 people, 2,237 households, and 1,353 families living in the city. The population density was 894.1 inhabitants per square mile (345.2/km^{2}). There were 2,373 housing units at an average density of 384.4 per square mile (148.4/km^{2}). The racial makeup of the city was 97.21% White, 0.31% African American, 0.67% Native American, 0.58% Asian, 0.02% Pacific Islander, 0.25% from other races, and 0.96% from two or more races. Hispanic or Latino of any race were 0.63% of the population. 24.7% were of Swedish, 24.6% German, 14.6% Norwegian and 5.1% Irish ancestry.

There were 2,237 households, out of which 32.1% had children under the age of 18 living with them, 44.5% were married couples living together, 12.8% had a female householder with no husband present, and 39.5% were non-families. 35.1% of all households were made up of individuals, and 19.5% had someone living alone who was 65 years of age or older. The average household size was 2.29 and the average family size was 2.95.

In the city, the population was spread out, with 24.9% under the age of 18, 8.7% from 18 to 24, 25.6% from 25 to 44, 17.8% from 45 to 64, and 23.1% who were 65 years of age or older. The median age was 38 years. For every 100 females, there were 82.2 males. For every 100 females age 18 and over, there were 76.9 males.

The median income for a household in the city was $35,313, and the median income for a family was $53,381. Males had a median income of $34,836 versus $23,681 for females. The per capita income for the city was $20,697. About 5.8% of families and 10.5% of the population were below the poverty line, including 8.6% of those under age 18 and 12.0% of those age 65 or over.

== Economy ==
Cambridge is a local commercial center. It contains several traditional big-box retail stores. The recently expanded Cambridge Medical Center serves as the regional health care center.

== Education ==
Cambridge-Isanti High School, Cambridge Middle School, Cambridge Intermediate School, and Cambridge Primary School serve the community. Two new schools, Cambridge Middle School and Isanti Intermediate School, were built in the fall of 2006 to house the expanding school population.

Cambridge Christian School, founded in 1978, has new facilities in the city of Cambridge.

Cambridge is also home to the Cambridge campus of Anoka-Ramsey Community College.

== Notable people ==
- Lynn H. Becklin - politician
- Robert C. Becklin - politician and businessman
- Mickey Erickson - professional football player for Chicago Cardinals and Boston Braves
- Godfrey G. Goodwin - former member of the U.S. House of Representatives
- Todd Hallowell - film producer
- Julia Hart - professional wrestler
- Kerri Hoskins - former glamour model and video game actress
- Brian Johnson - politician
- Corie Barry (Chief Executive Officer for Best Buy)
- Grace McCallum - Olympic gymnast
- Rhonda Sivarajah - politician

== Gallery ==
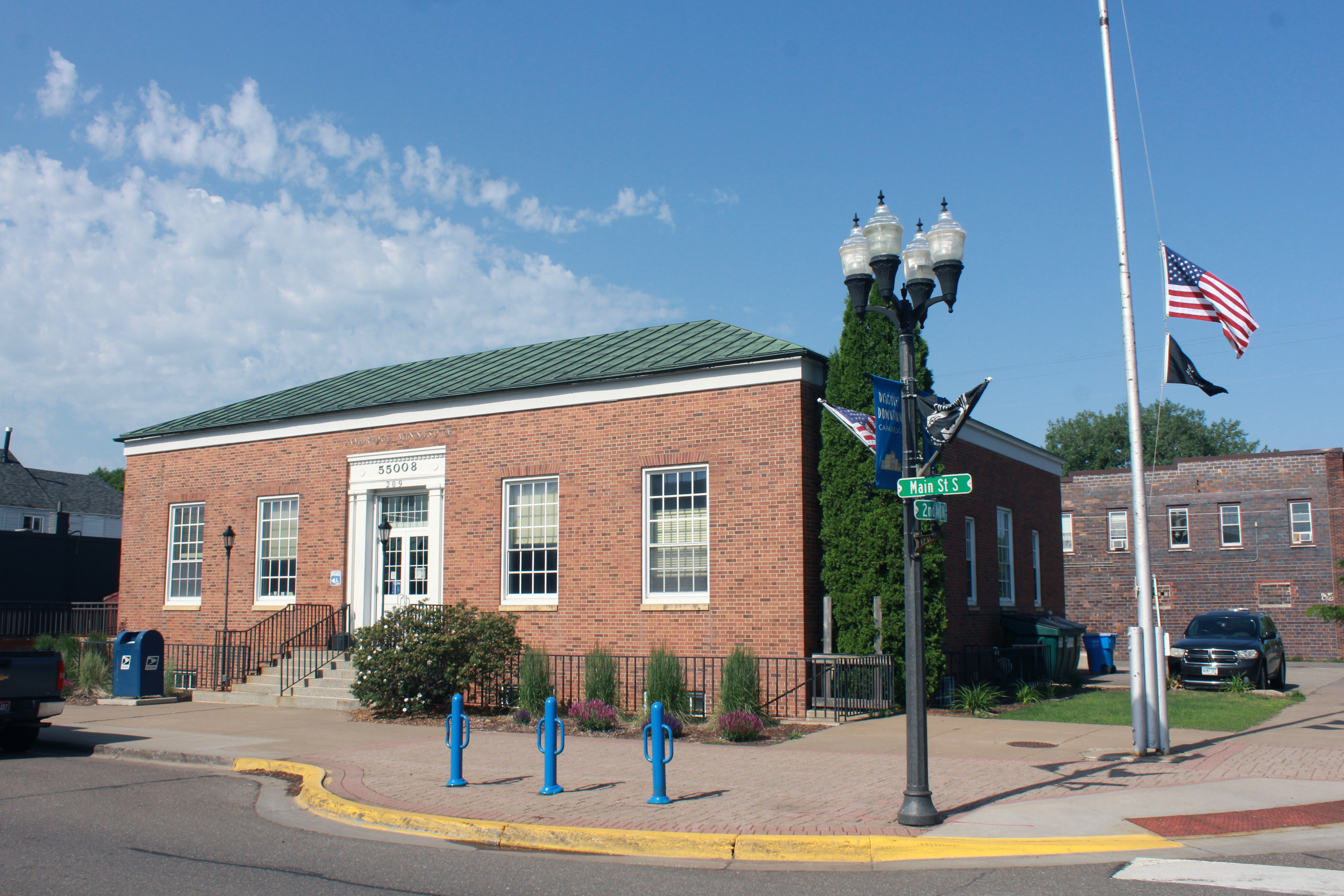
U.S. Post Office

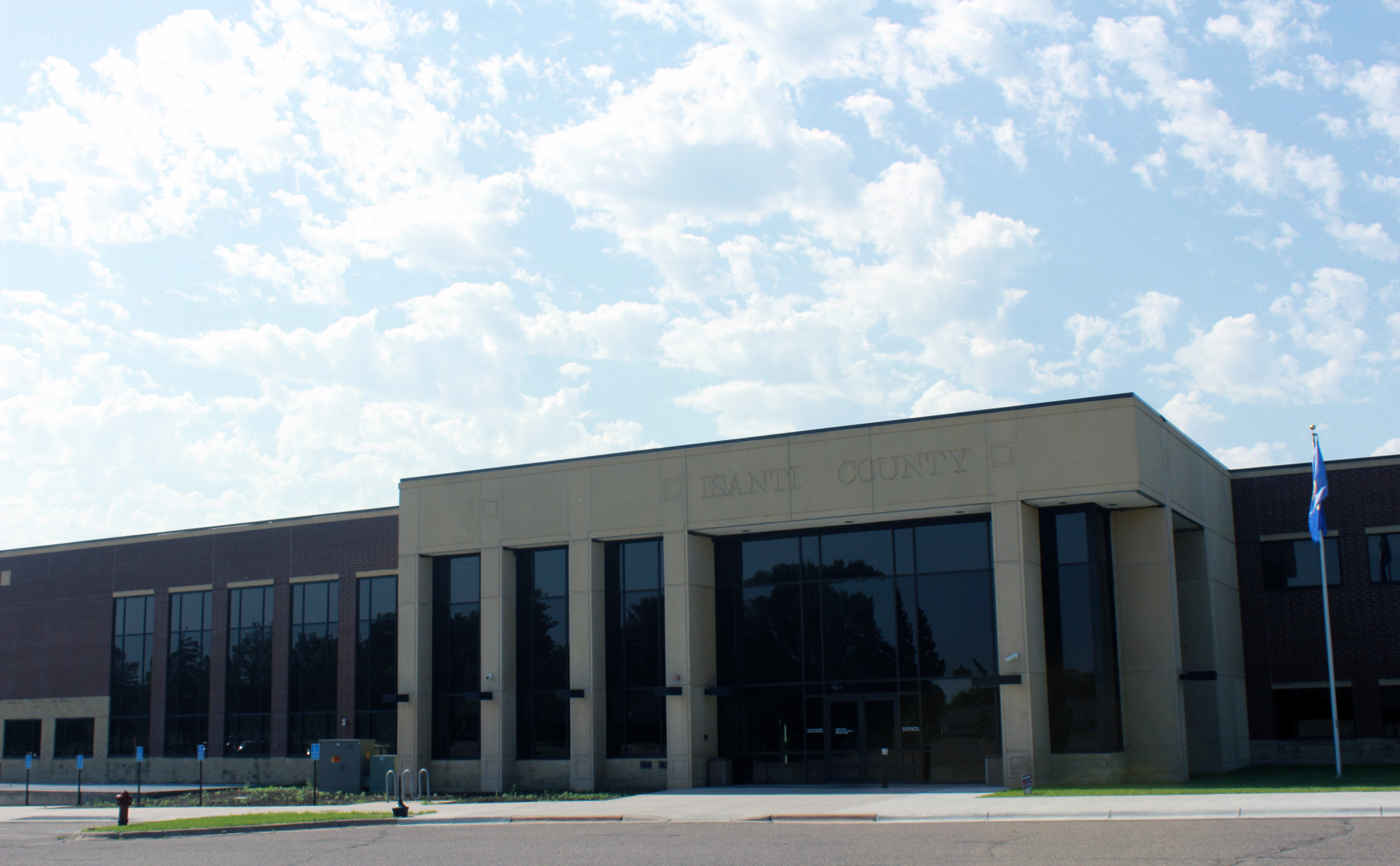
Isanti County Government Center

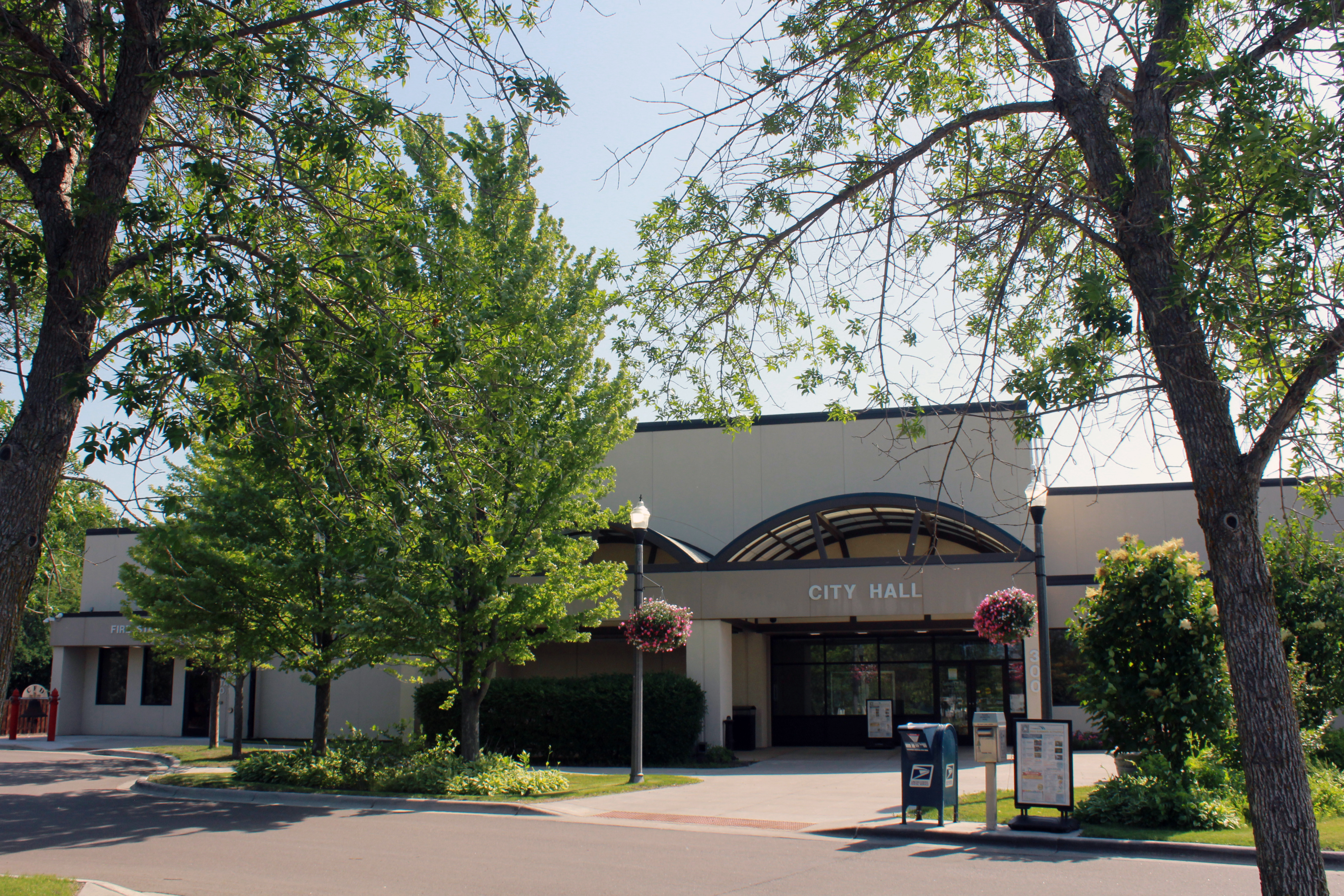
City Hall

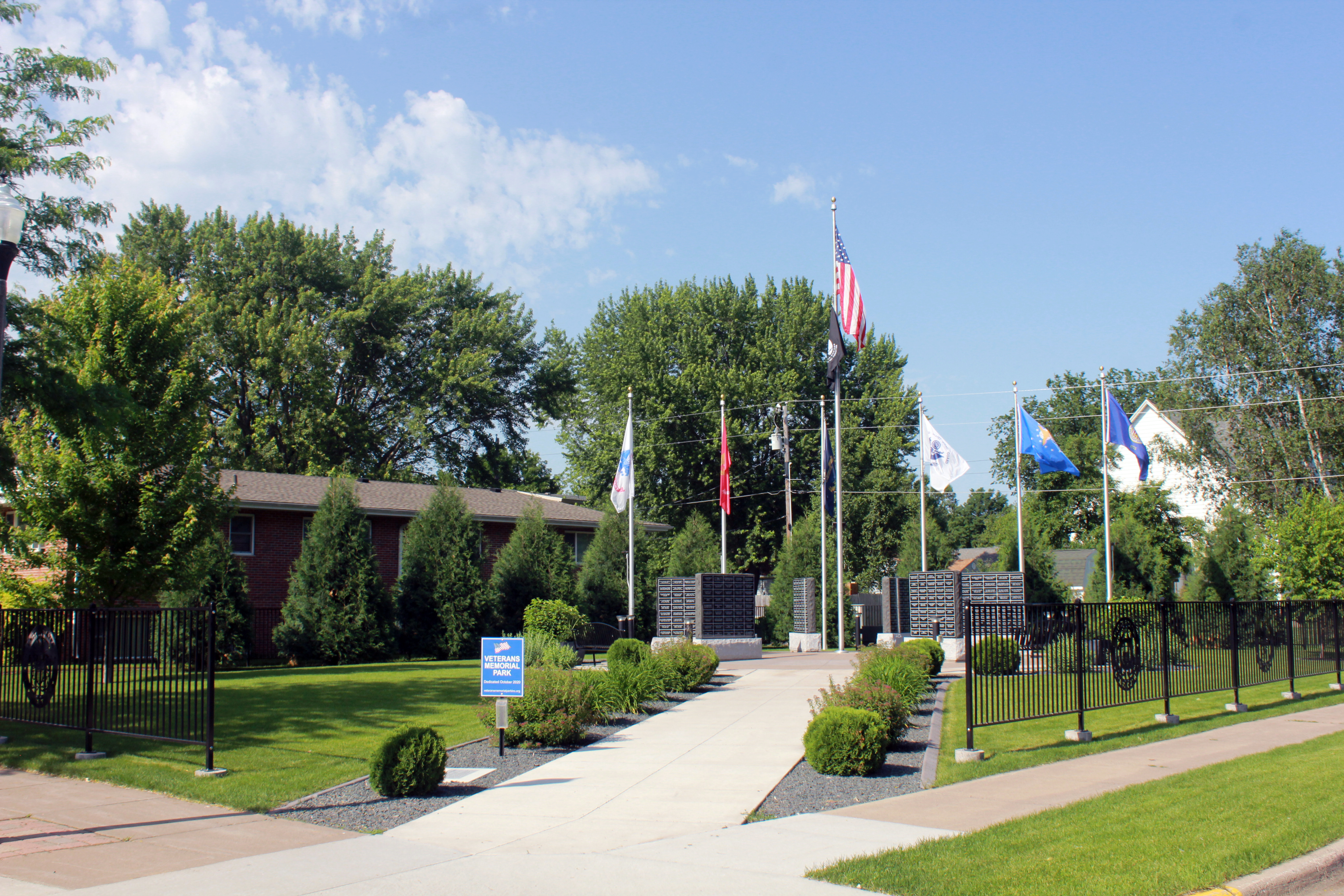
Veterans Memorial Park

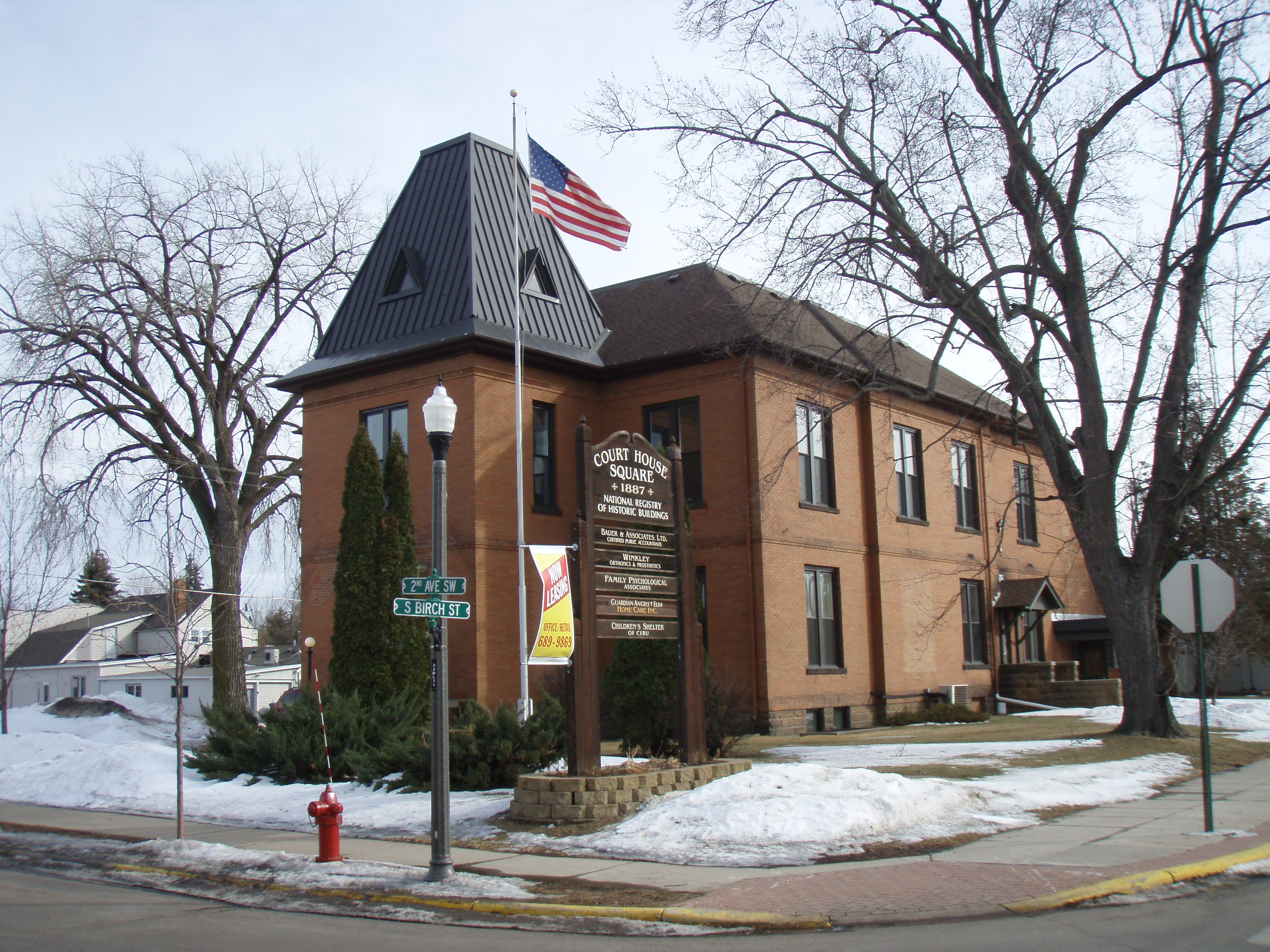
Former Isanti County Courthouse
