= Belser =

Belser is a surname, and may refer to:

- Burkey Belser (1947–2023), American graphic designer
- Caesar Edward Belser, American football player
- Helmut Belser, World War II Luftwaffe fighter ace
- James Edwin Belser (1800–1854), American politician
- Jason Belser, American football player
- W. Gordon Belser Arboretum (or Belser Arboretum; named after W. Gordon Belser)
- William Belser Spong Jr. (1920–1997), Senator of Virginia

== See also ==
- Belzer - disambiguation page
- Beltzer - disambiguation page
