= USC School of Business =

USC School of Business may refer to:

- Darla Moore School of Business, University of South Carolina
- USC Marshall School of Business, University of Southern California
