= Mechitza =

Gender barrier in Jewish synagogues

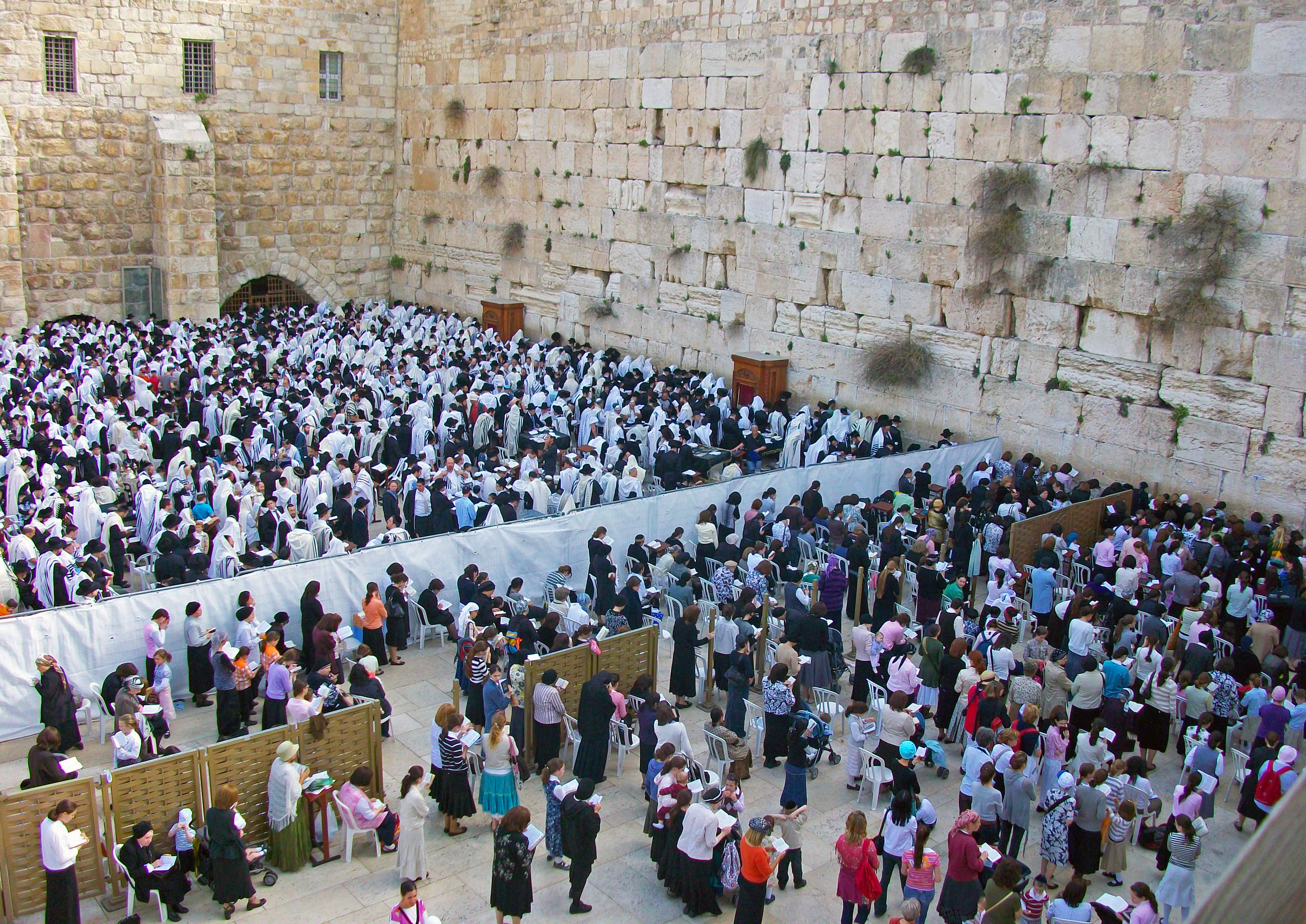
Separation between men and women at the Western Wall

A mechitza (Hebrew: מחיצה, partition or division, pl.: מחיצות, mechitzot) in Judaism is a partition, particularly one that is used to separate men and women.

The rationale in halakha (Jewish law) for a partition dividing men and women is derived from the Babylonian Talmud. A divider in the form of a balcony was established in the Temple in Jerusalem for the Simchat Beit HaShoeivah ceremony, a time of great celebration and festivity. The divider was first established to preserve modesty and attention during this time.

During the mid-20th century, a substantial number of modern Orthodox synagogues did not have mechitzot. However, the Orthodox Union (OU), the main body of Modern Orthodox synagogues in the United States, adopted a policy of not accepting as new members synagogues without mechitzot, and strongly encouraged existing synagogues to adopt them. Men and women are generally not separated in most Conservative synagogues, but it is a permissible option within Conservative Judaism; some Conservative synagogues, particularly in Canada, have separate seating for men and women, with or without a physical partition. Reform congregations, consistent with the movement's core value of gender equality, do not use mechitzot in their synagogues.

== Origin ==
=== Talmudic era ===
Although the synagogue mechitza is not mentioned anywhere in Talmudic literature, there is a discussion of a barrier between men and women, used at the Sukkot festivities in the Jerusalem Temple. The Amoraic sage Rav explains that the divider originated with a statement of the prophet Zechariah regarding the mourning following the war between Gog and Magog:

The land will mourn each of the families by itself: the family of the house of David by itself, and their wives by themselves; the family of Nathan by itself and their wives by themselves; the family of the house of Levi by itself and their wives by themselves; the family of Shimei by itself and their wives by themselves; and all the families who remain, each of the families by itself and their wives by themselves.

Rav said that if such a sad occasion necessitates a separation between men and women, then the Simchat Beit HaShoeivah in the Temple in Jerusalem (a very happy occasion) does as well.

Scholars have long debated the extent to which gender segregation and a mechitza between the sexes existed in synagogues during the periods of the Second Temple, the Mishnah, and the Talmud. Shmuel Safrai, based on a combination of textual analysis and archaeological evidence, has said that while women consistently attended synagogue services, there is no definitive evidence to support the existence of a partition separating the genders or the existence of a separate women's aid (Ezrat Nashim). The archaeologist Lee Levine said that there is no evidence in the dedicatory inscriptions found in archaeological excavations regarding the existence of mechitzot, and furthermore, no structure has been found that can be interpreted as a mechitza.

=== Medieval period ===
Rabbi Meir of Rothenburg (13th century, Germany) is reported to have had a separate women's section in his synagogue.

Rabbi Shlomo ibn Aderet (13th century, Spain) mentions a women's section in synagogue.

The Yu Aw Synagogue in Afghanistan, built in 1393, has a separate women's gallery.

== Separate seating in synagogue ==
A mechitza most commonly means the physical divider placed between the men's and women's sections in Orthodox synagogues and at religious celebrations.

In some synagogues, the mechitza divided the front and back of the synagogue. In others it divides the left and right sides of the synagogue. The latter is often seen as more equal, since the women are not farther away from the service than the men.

The women's section of the synagogue is called the Ezrat Nashim (עזרת נשים, women's courtyard) after a similar area in the Temple in Jerusalem. In Ashkenazic European synagogues, the women's section or annex was called the weibershul.

The Orthodox Union (OU), the main body of Modern Orthodox synagogues in the United States, adopted a policy of not accepting synagogues without mechitzot as new members, and strongly encouraging existing synagogues to adopt them. In 2002, Rabbi Avi Weiss of Yeshivat Chovevei Torah, stated that "As an Orthodox institution, Yeshivat Chovevei Torah requires its students to daven in synagogues with mechitzot." The Jewish Ledger reported that as of 2005, "Beth Midrash Hagadol-Beth Joseph remains the only synagogue in the country affiliated with the Orthodox Union (OU) to have so-called 'mixed seating.'" However, in 2015 this synagogue decided to leave the OU, after learning that the OU was planning to expel it from OU membership.

The Union for Traditional Judaism, a so-called ‘Conservadox’ organization, recently published a viewpoint arguing that a mechitza is not required to have a particular height by either Biblical law or rabbinic decree.

Reform and Reconstructionist Judaism, consistent with their view that traditional religious law is not mandatory in modern times and a more liberal interpretation of gender roles, do not use mechitzot in their synagogues. This development is historically connected with the United States; the original German Reform retained the women's balcony, although the "curtain or lattice-work" was removed. (Even in Orthodoxy there is a dispute as to whether a balcony requires a curtain.)

=== Height ===
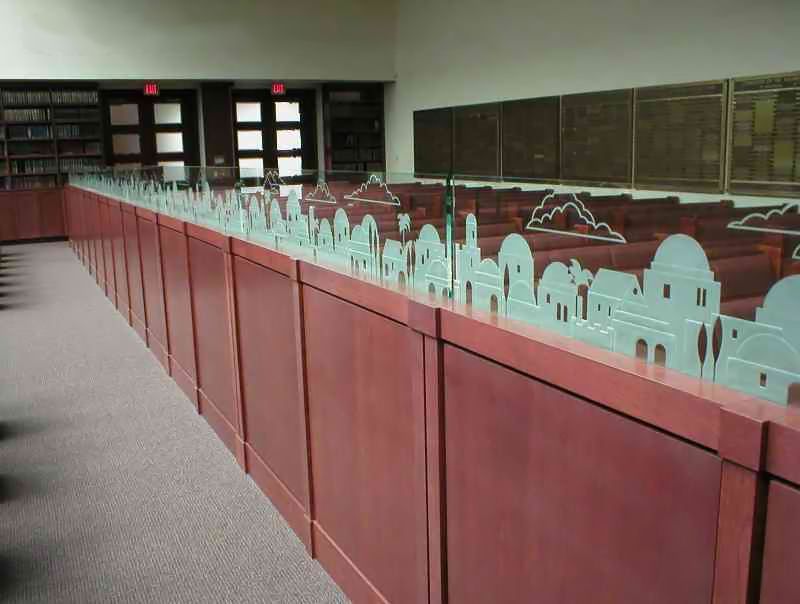
This mechitza was created for the Suburban Torah Center in Livingston, New Jersey, and features etched glass ornamentation.

There are different views on the proper height of a mechitzah separating men and women in a synagogue. According to the Shulchan Aruch HaRav, a mechitza needs to prevent men from seeing a woman who might be immodestly dressed, and hence a mechitza needs to be as tall as a man, or 6 feet (180 centimetres). However, according to Orthodox Rabbi Ahron Soloveichik, a mechitzah need only serve as a halakhic partition, and hence need only be the minimum height for such a partition, i.e. 10 tefachim (about 32 inches or 80 centimetres). Rabbi Moshe Feinstein had an intermediate view, requiring a height of 18 tefachim (about 58 inches or 145 centimetres).

To accommodate stricter interpretations while simultaneously allowing women to see the male prayer leader, many synagogues will make an opaque wall that is 3–4 feet high and add a lattice, screen, one-way glass, or other semi-transparent material above that opaque wall. The design shown at right is an example: The etched glass is semi-transparent, while the opaque wall adheres to what the synagogue requires as the minimum height requirement. The Or Torah synagogue in Skokie, Illinois has a similar design.

=== Designs ===
There are different styles of mechitzot, depending on the number of women the synagogue expects to attend their prayer services, how dedicated the congregation is to accommodating women who wish to pray with the congregation, and whether the congregation believes that the purpose of the mechitza is to provide a social separation or to prevent the men from seeing the women.

Any of these options can be made so that they go across the length of the room so that men and women are side-by-side or so that they go across the width of the room so that women sit behind the men. Synagogues in which women sit next to the men are generally more concerned with women's ability to join equally in prayer with the congregation.

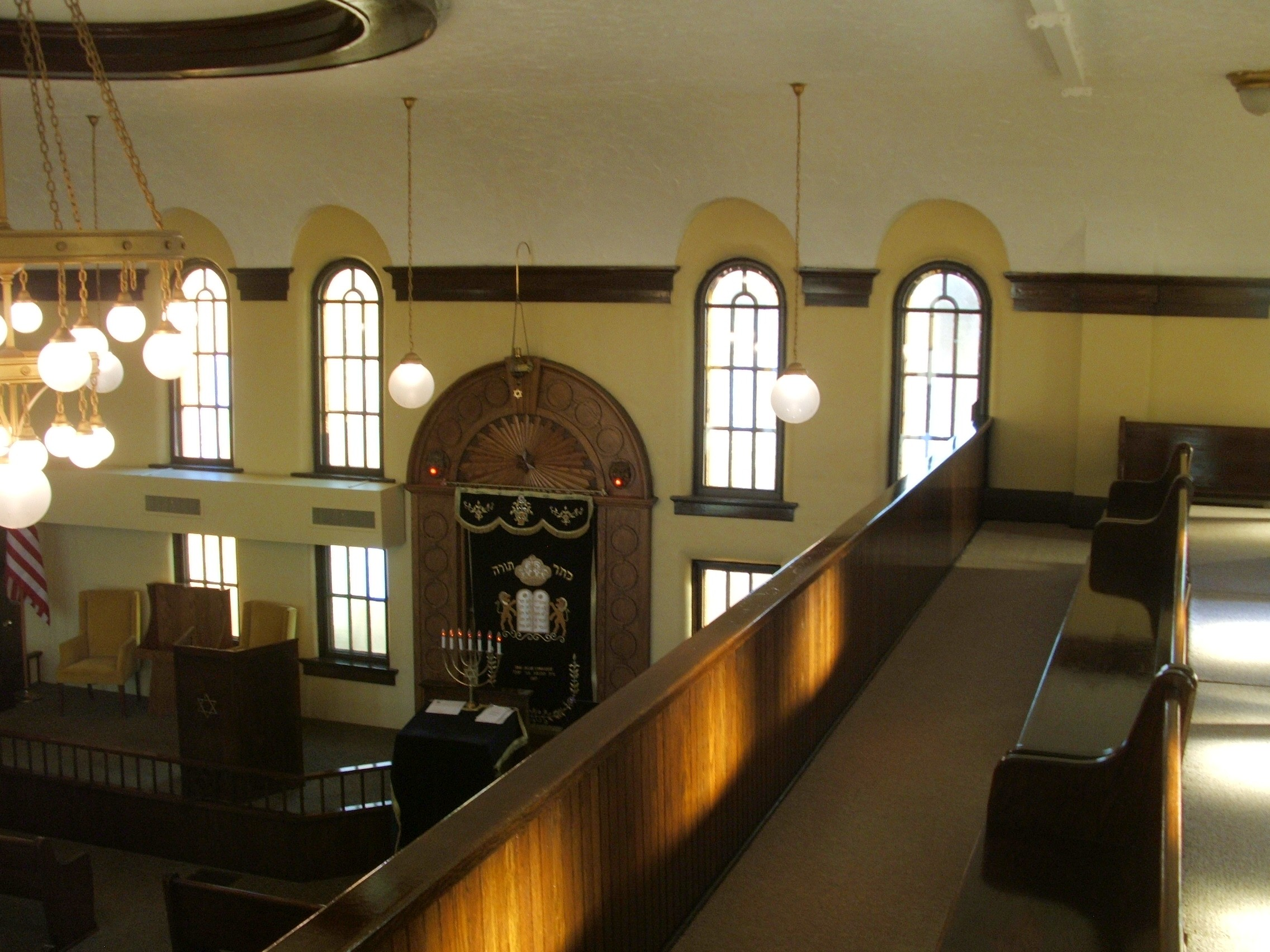
View over the mechitza from the women's balcony of the B'nai Jacob Synagogue (Ottumwa, Iowa)

Balcony
Balconies with a three-foot wall are themselves traditionally considered fitting mechitzot. In this design, women sit in the balcony and men sit below. This design was common in the 19th and early 20th century, and is common in Europe, including the Shaarei Tikva synagogue in Lisbon (opened in 1904). Examples in the United States include the Bnei Israel Synagogue in Baltimore (opened 1845), B'nai Jacob in Ottumwa, Iowa (opened 1915), Temple Beth Shalom (the Tremont Street Shul) in Cambridge, Massachusetts (opened 1925 as Temple Ashkenaz), and the Beth Efraim Bukharian Jewish Synagogue in Forest Hills, New York (70th Avenue). Some of these American examples are modeled after specific European synagogues, others are best classified as vernacular architecture. A Canadian example is the Beth Jacob Synagogue in North York, Ontario.
Balconies with curtains or one-way glass
More strict congregations add a curtain to the balcony so that men cannot see even women's faces.
Central partition
A fixed-height gate or planter running down the center of the room, so that women and men both face front side by side. Often these partitions are minimal height (3 feet or 0.91 m). In addition to the partition, sometimes the women's section is elevated by about a foot above the men's section. Example of a lower partition with a raised floor is in Anshe Shalom Bnei Israel synagogue in Chicago and Young Israel of Ocean Parkway in Flatbush, Brooklyn. An example of a medium-high partition (5 feet (1.5 m)) without a raised floor is the Adas Israel in Hamilton, Ontario. An example of a higher partition with a raised floor is in Mount Sinai Jewish Center of Washington Heights in Manhattan.
Booth
Synagogues that expect very few women to attend provide a token space that can accommodate about six women comfortably. The space is demarcated by moveable, opaque partitions that are over 6 feet (1.8 m) high. Examples are in the Yeshiva University beit midrash, and the Shabbat afternoon service at Young Israel of Avenue J in Flatbush, Brooklyn. In some synagogues, the booth is a supplement to the balcony, to accommodate women who have difficulty walking up the stairs (such as at She'erith Israel Congregation, Glen Avenue, Baltimore).
Fixed-height opaque wall
Sometimes with a non-opaque curtain, screen, glass, or other material above the wall, which can include: blinds or a curtain that can be opened during announcements or a sermon, etched glass, stained glass, a one-way screen with lights so that women can see through without being seen (e.g. Beth Jacob Shaarei Zion and Suburban Orthodox in Baltimore).
The mechitza at the Bostoner Rebbe's synagogue in Brookline, Massachusetts, is made entirely of panels from the Boston John Hancock Tower (which had been removed from that building due to safety concerns). The Bostoner Rebbe chose these panels because they are one-way glass so the women can see out, but men cannot see into the women's section. Later, the Rebbe's wife put curtains inside the women's section, so that women could not see into the men's section.)
Curtain
Usually 5 feet (1.5 m) tall or higher, made of opaque or semi-opaque material, held up by poles on stands or a clothesline. This option costs less than the above fixed options and is used frequently by synagogues that wish to use their prayer halls for mixed-sex functions in addition to separate sex prayer. College Hillel Orthodox minyans may choose this option because the rooms at Hillel are all used for multiple purposes besides prayer.
Separate room
The strictest separation has women in a separate room from the men, able to view through one-way glass or an open window from a balcony, or not view at all. Examples of this are the yeshiva Ohr Someach in the neighborhood of Maalot Dafna in Jerusalem, where the men sit in a first floor room with a two-story ceiling, and the women are on the second floor with a window overlooking the men's prayer hall. A similar design (men first floor, women second floor) is in 770 Eastern Parkway, the main synagogue for the Chabad Lubavitch movement in Crown Heights, Brooklyn, and the Main Belzer Shul in Jerusalem.

== Uses unrelated to gender separation ==
=== Eruv ===
In halakhic discourse, "mechitza" can also refer to the boundary walls of an eruv for carrying (to carry within a given area on the Sabbath the area must be entirely enclosed). There are many specific rules for what constitutes a valid mechitza, although the mechitza does not have to be solid. (For example, there are many instances where part of an eruv may be a string run across several poles, and this could constitute a valid mechitza).

=== Sukkah ===
The walls of a sukkah are also referred to as a "mechitza" in the Talmud. These walls must be at least ten tefachim (approximately 32 inches or 81 cm) high for the sukkah to be valid.

== See also ==
- Gender separation in mosques
- Gender separation in Judaism
