= Court Hill Historic District =

Historic district in Iowa, United States

- U.S. National Register of Historic Places
- U.S. Historic district
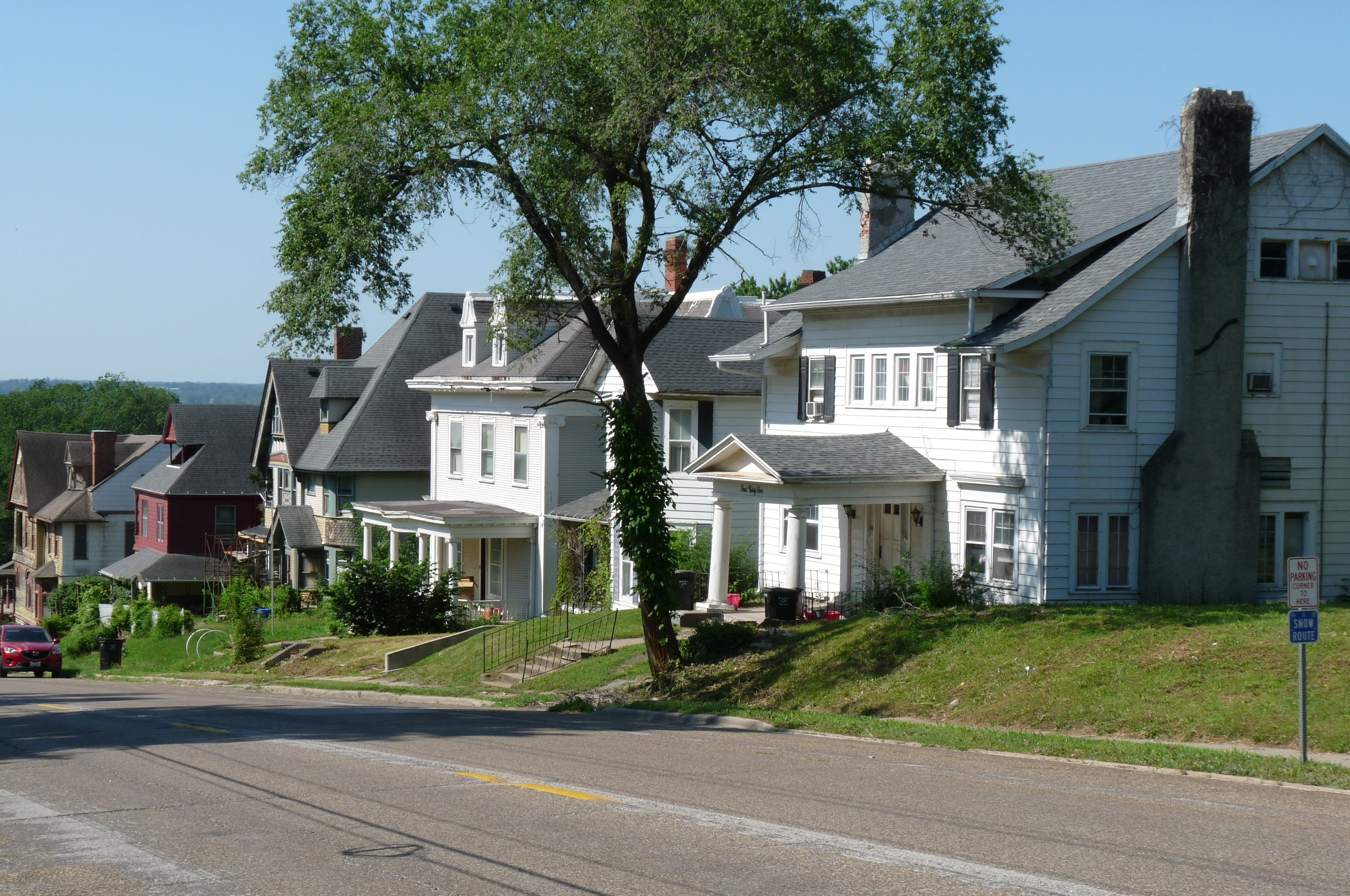
- West side of 400 block of N Court Street, facing SSW

- Location within Iowa Location within the United States
- Location: 111 E. Court and 407-1004 N. Court Sts. Ottumwa, Iowa
- Coordinates: 41°1′31″N 92°24′31″W
- Area: 27 acres (11 ha)
- Architect: George Kerns; Edward Clark
- Architectural style: Late 19th and 20th Century Revivals
- MPS: Ottumwa MPS
- NRHP reference No.: 97001605
- Added to NRHP: January 7, 1998

Court Hill Historic District is a historic district located in Ottumwa, Iowa, United States. It is a residential area of large homes with a few small homes in between. The district was listed on the National Register of Historic Places in 1998 as a part of Ottumwa MPS. At the time of its nomination it contained 84 resources, which included 56 contributing buildings, two contributing structures, 25 non-contributing buildings, and one non-contributing site.

== History ==
Ottumwa was laid out in 1843 along the north bank of the Des Moines river, with stores and log cabins between the river and the bluff in the early years. In 1844 it was named the county seat. In 1860 the town's population was about 1600 and growing. By the 1850s, the town was growing out of the river bottom, up the bluff which Court Street now ascends.

Court Street was developed as a major artery from the Des Moines River to Sixth Street, which was Ottumwa's original city limits, where it made a slight turn to the north and headed up a bluff and into the countryside above the river valley. It is possible that it is the road established by the Iowa Territorial Legislature in 1844 that extended from the southern Davis County border to the northern Wapello County border and connected the two county seats. Later it was signed as U.S. Highway 63. The oldest houses in the district were built between 1865 and 1875. The first electric streetcar began operating on Court Street in 1889. The street was paved with bricks in 1890 and 1891. Both projects led to increased development of the area between 1890 and 1915. From this period until 1942, a centralized steam heat system was available in the city and the main pipes were located under Court Street. Because of this, the street was never covered with snow or ice during the winter and people could always climb to the top of the bluff when other streets were impassable. During the World War II years, many of the large homes were divided into multi-family dwellings. That process started to be reversed in the late 20th century when historic preservation took root in Ottumwa.

== Architecture ==
Most of the houses are large in size, but a few smaller houses are scattered throughout the district. While some of the houses have been altered over the years, most of them retain a high level of integrity. Very few of the original buildings in the district have been torn down, and therefore, there is little in the way of new construction. A variety of the most fashionable Victorian styles were built in the district. The most popular include Italianate, Neoclassical, and Queen Anne. Architects who have designs in the district include George Kern, Edward Clark, and Fisher & Lawrie.

Following are some key properties in the district, in roughly the order built.

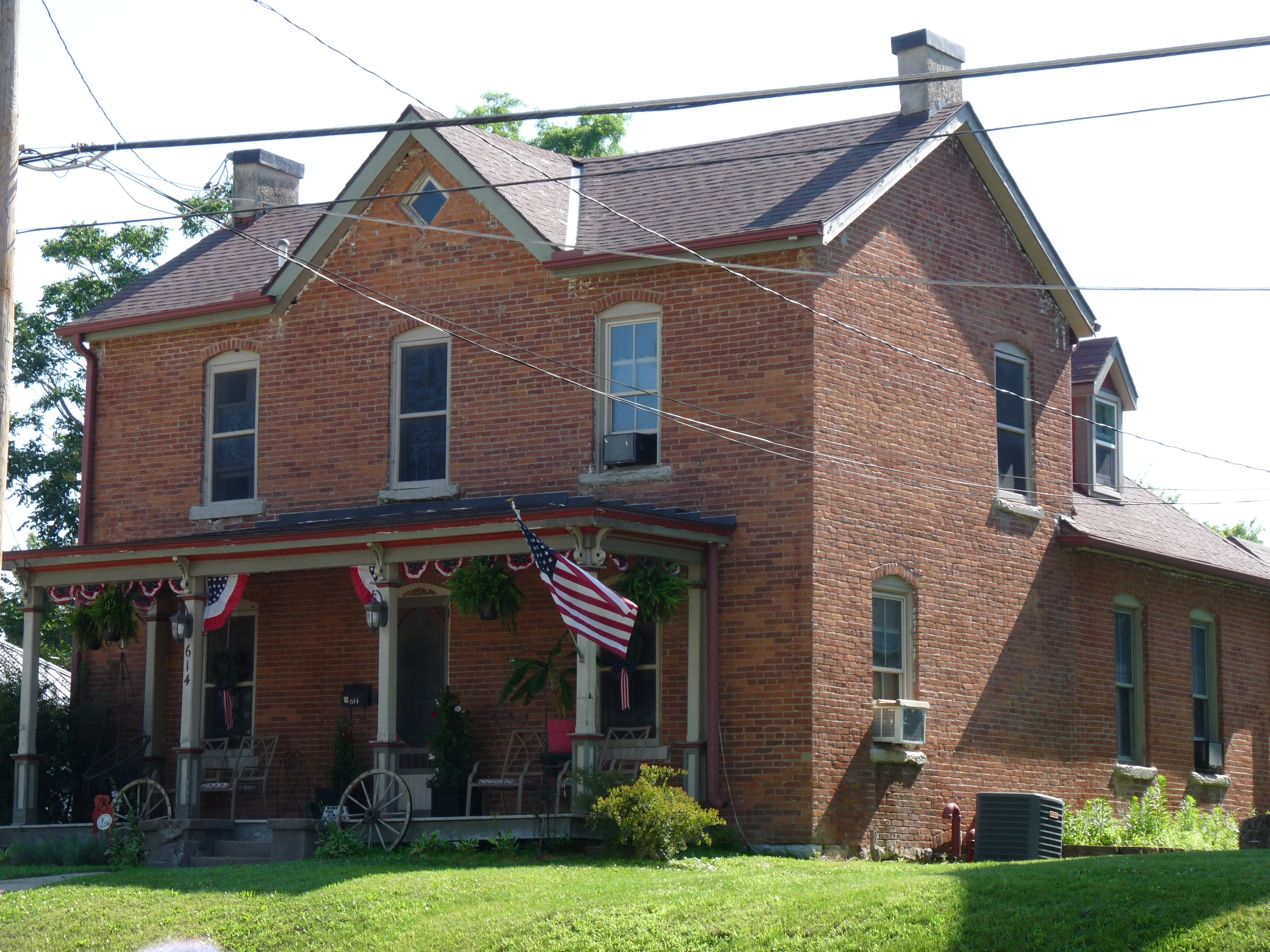
614 N Court St in Ottumwa Iowa was built in 1865.

- The house at 164 N Court St was built in 1865. It is clad in brick with vaguely Italianate style, which was popular at that time.

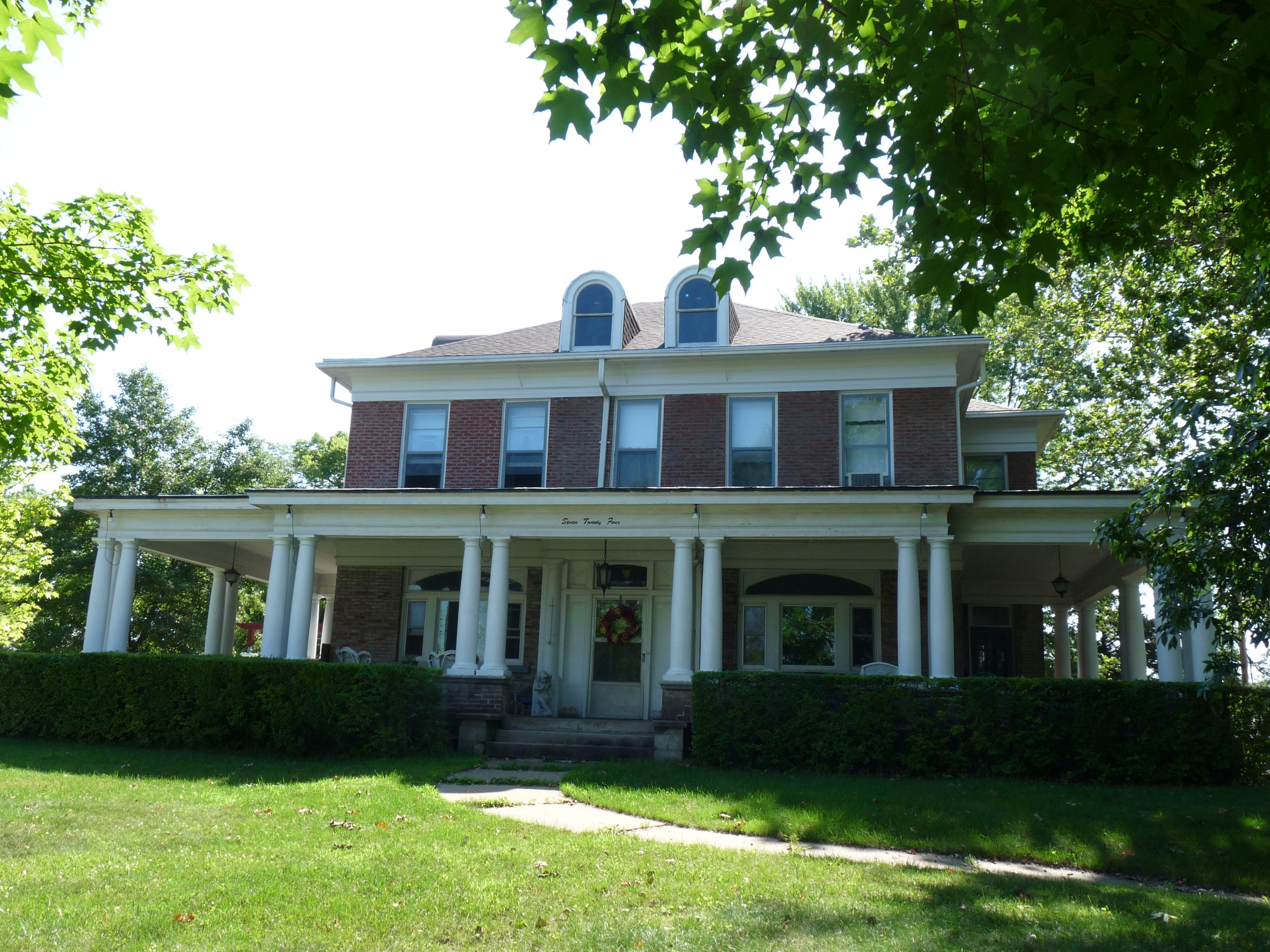
Fulton house, 1865-1870, now Colonial Revival

- The Major Charles and Tabitha Fulton house at 724 N Court St was built shortly after the Civil War, and was probably considered to be in the country then. Major Fulton died in 1870, leaving his survivors in the house. Around 1910 the house was renovated from some earlier style, adding the porches and the arched windows on the first floor.

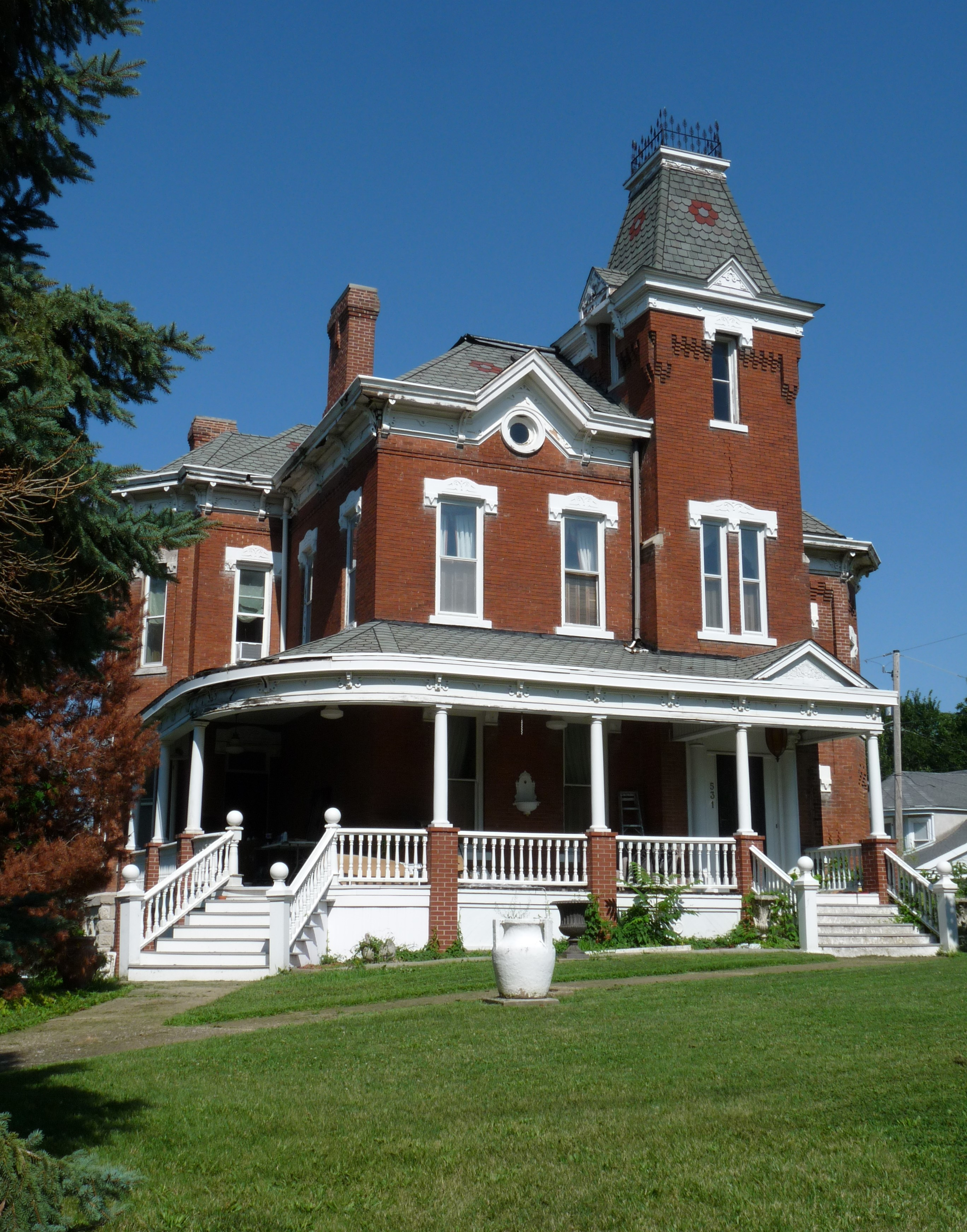
Johnston house, 1882, High Victorian Gothic style

- The Allen Johnston house at 531 N Court St was designed by Edward Clark in High Victorian Gothic style and built in 1882. Johnston was an inventor who established the Johnston Ruffler Company, Ottumwa Iron Works, and the Johnston & Sharp Manufacturing Company. The current wraparound porch is an 1897 replacement for two smaller original porches.

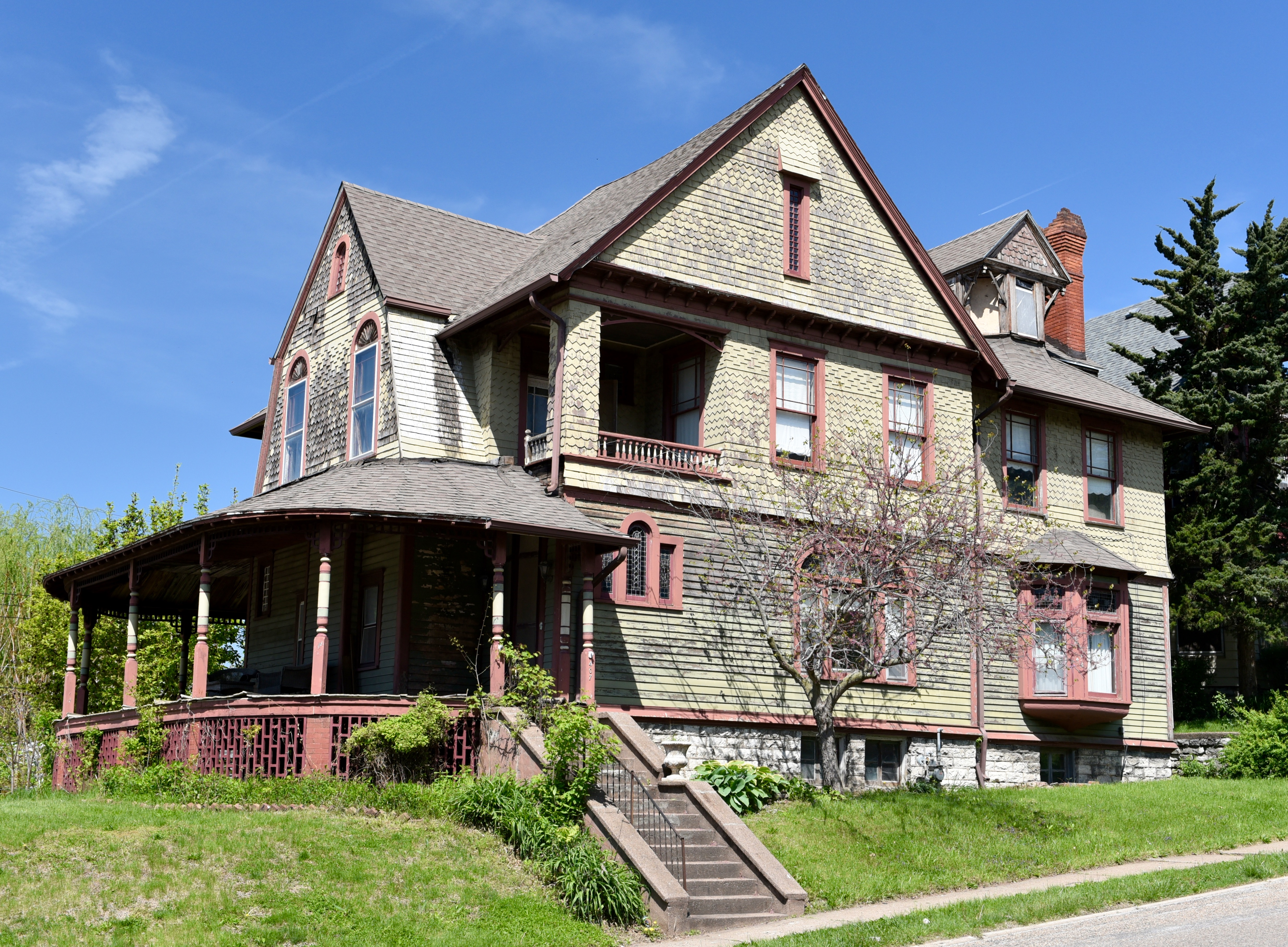
Wyman house, 1888, Queen Anne style

- The W.C. Wyman house at 407 N Court St was built in 1888, designed in Queen Anne style, with the typical complex roof surfaces, asymmetric facade, wraparound porch, and varied surface textures, including the common fish-scale shingles.

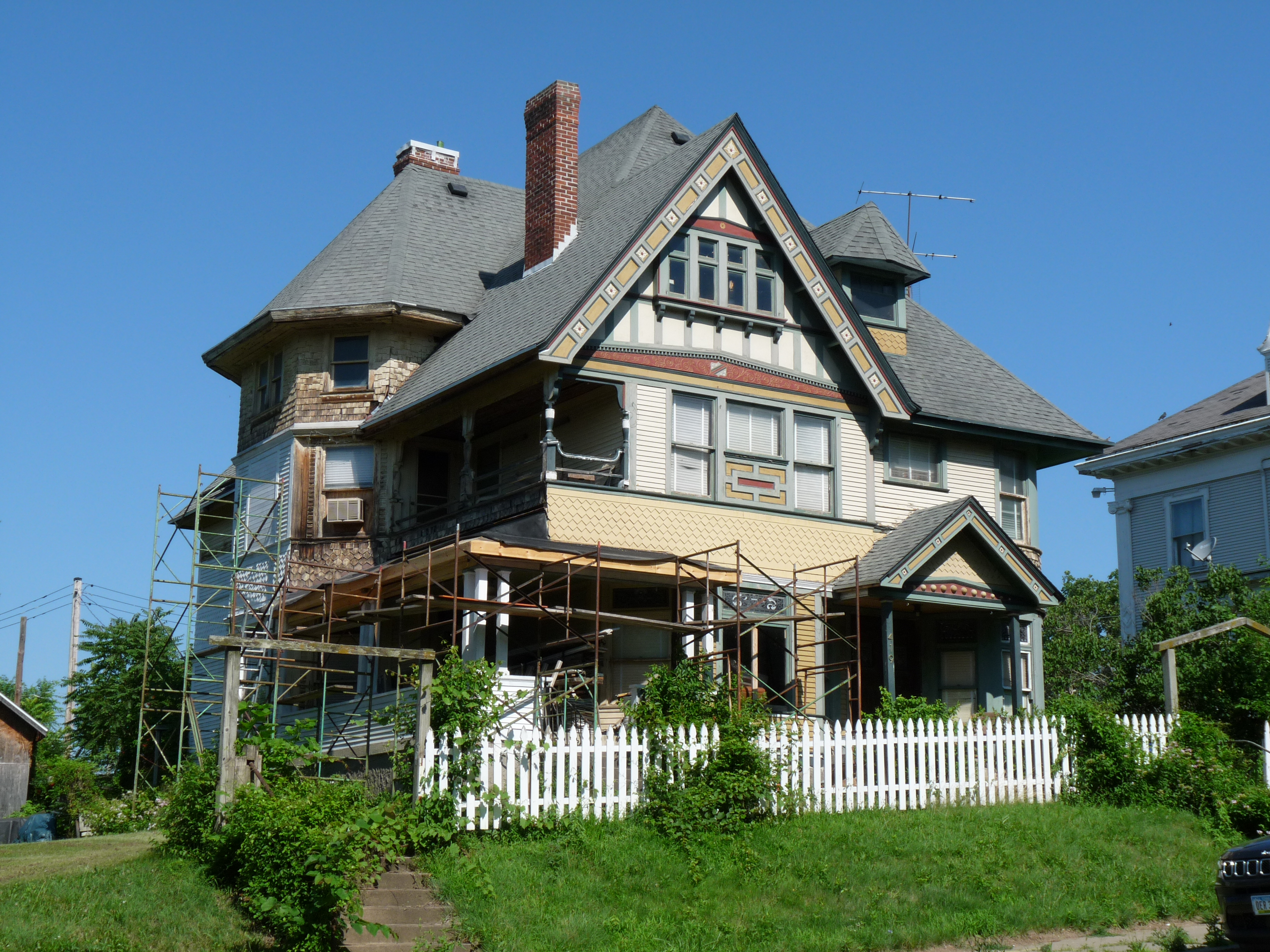
Jordan house, 1889, Queen Anne style

- The J.C. Jordan house at 419 N. Court St was built in 1889. Its style is Queen Anne, with many of the same features as the Wyman house above.

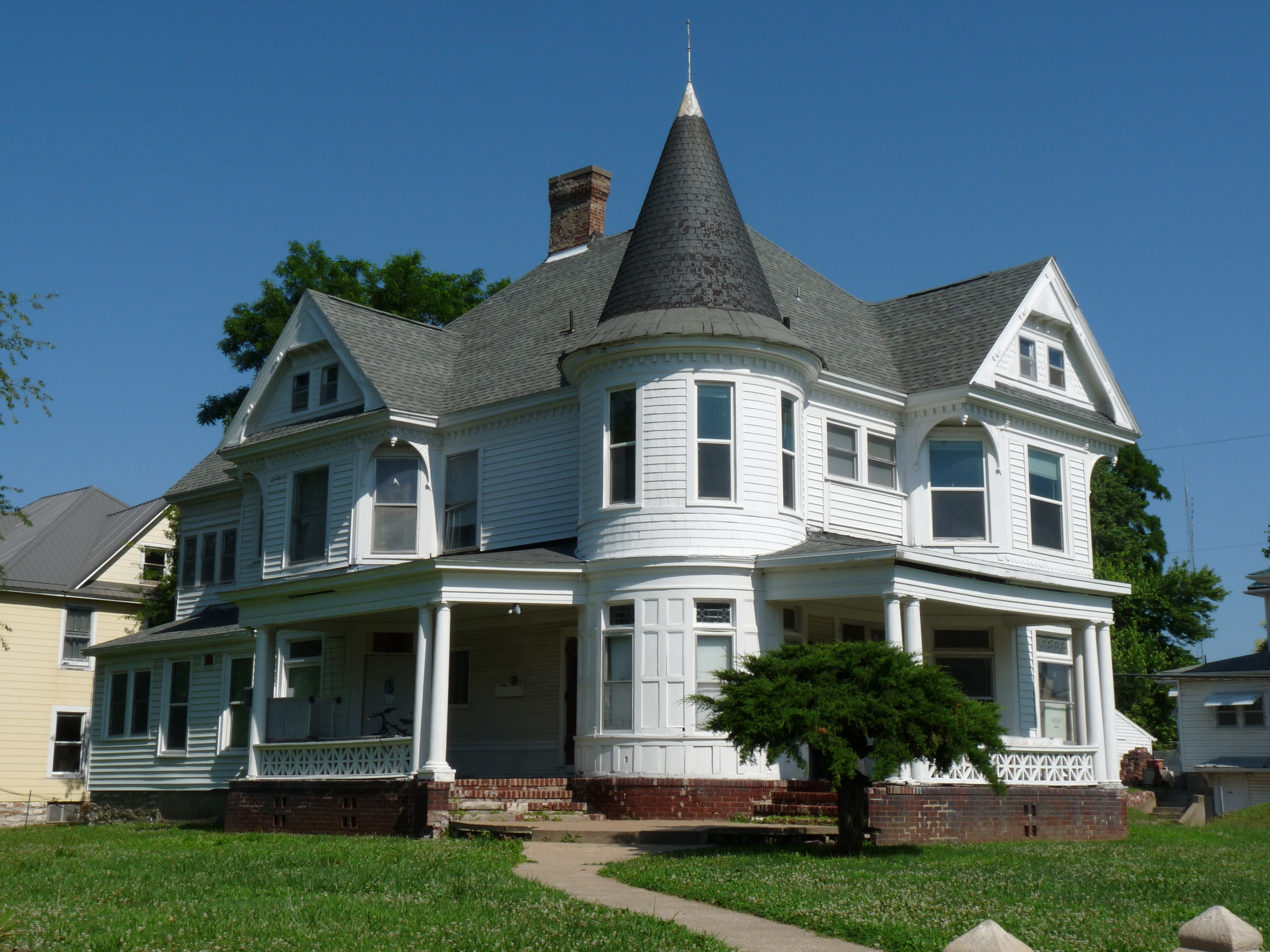
Cooper house, ca 1893, Queen Anne

- The W.C. Cooper house at 625 N. Court St was built around 1893. A classic Queen Anne with the complex roof, asymmetric facade, and corner turret, the porches originally connected, curving around the turret.

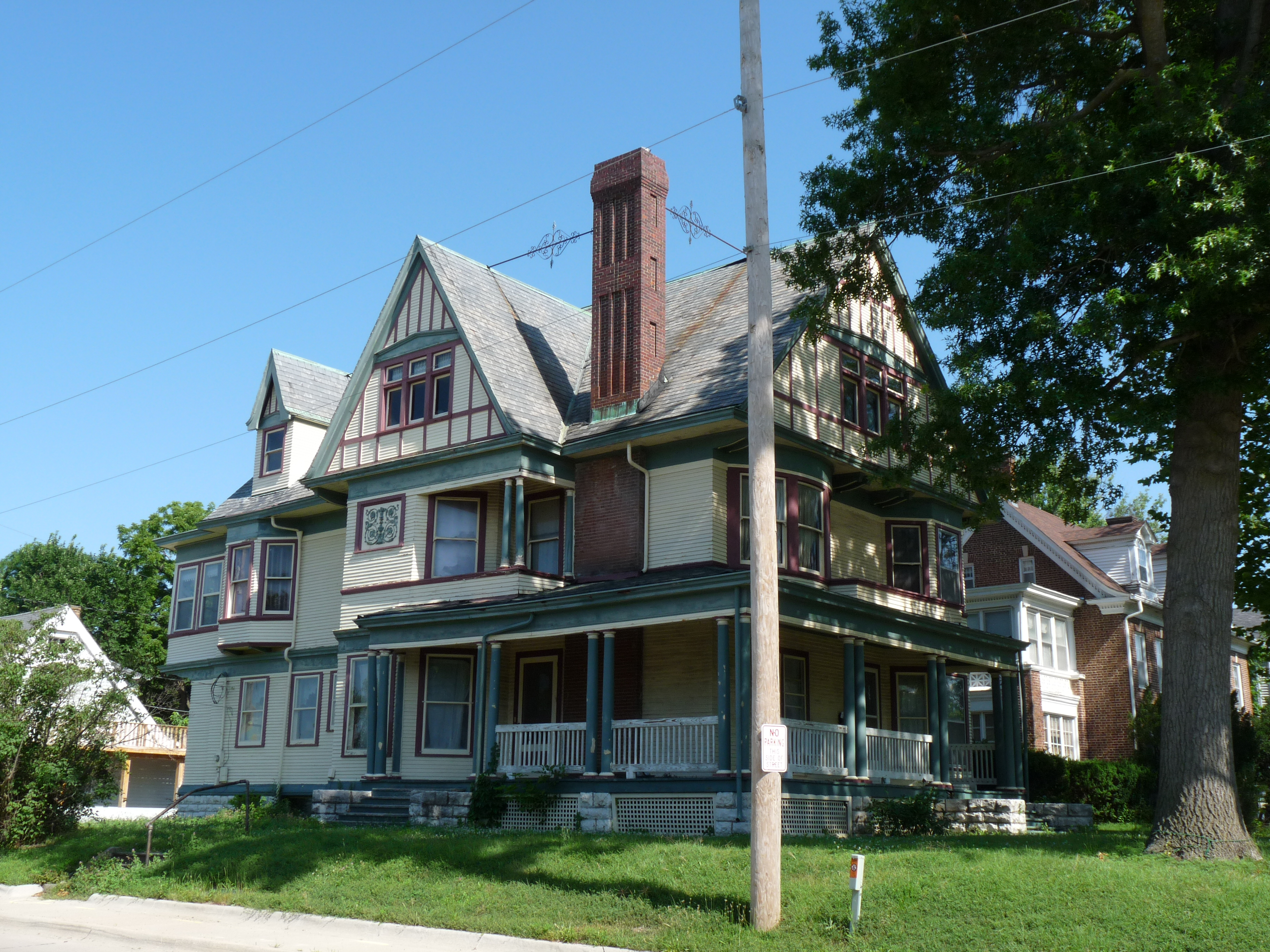
Calhoun house, 1896, Queen Anne

- The J.W. Calhoun house at 601 N. Court St was built in 1896. Fisher and Lawrie of Omaha designed it in Queen Anne style, indicated by the asymmetry, and the varied surface textures.

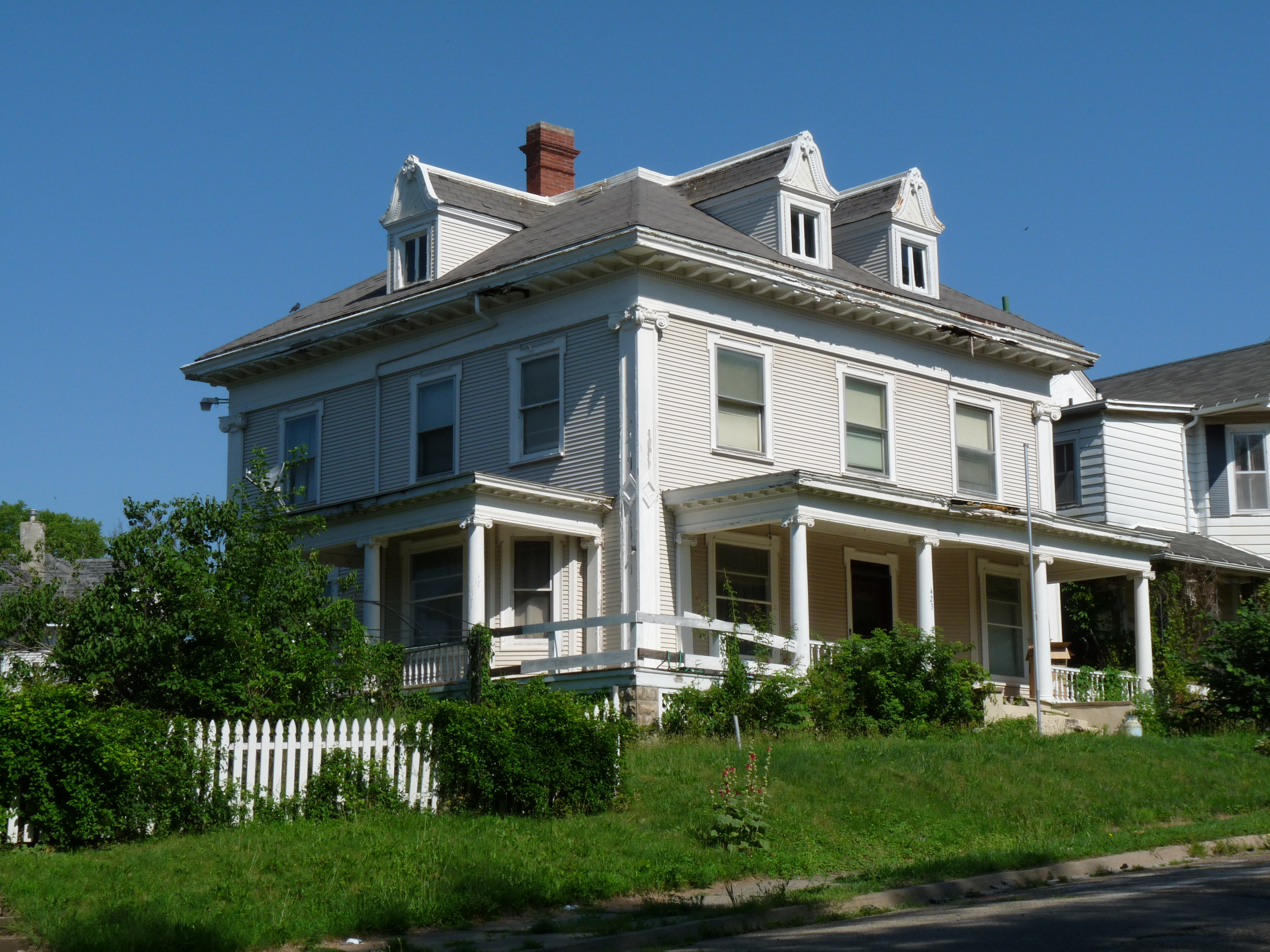
423 N Court Street, ca 1900, Neoclassical style

- The house at 423 N Court St was built around 1900. Its style is Neoclassical, with the corner pilasters and Ionic columns drawn from ancient Greek and Roman architecture.

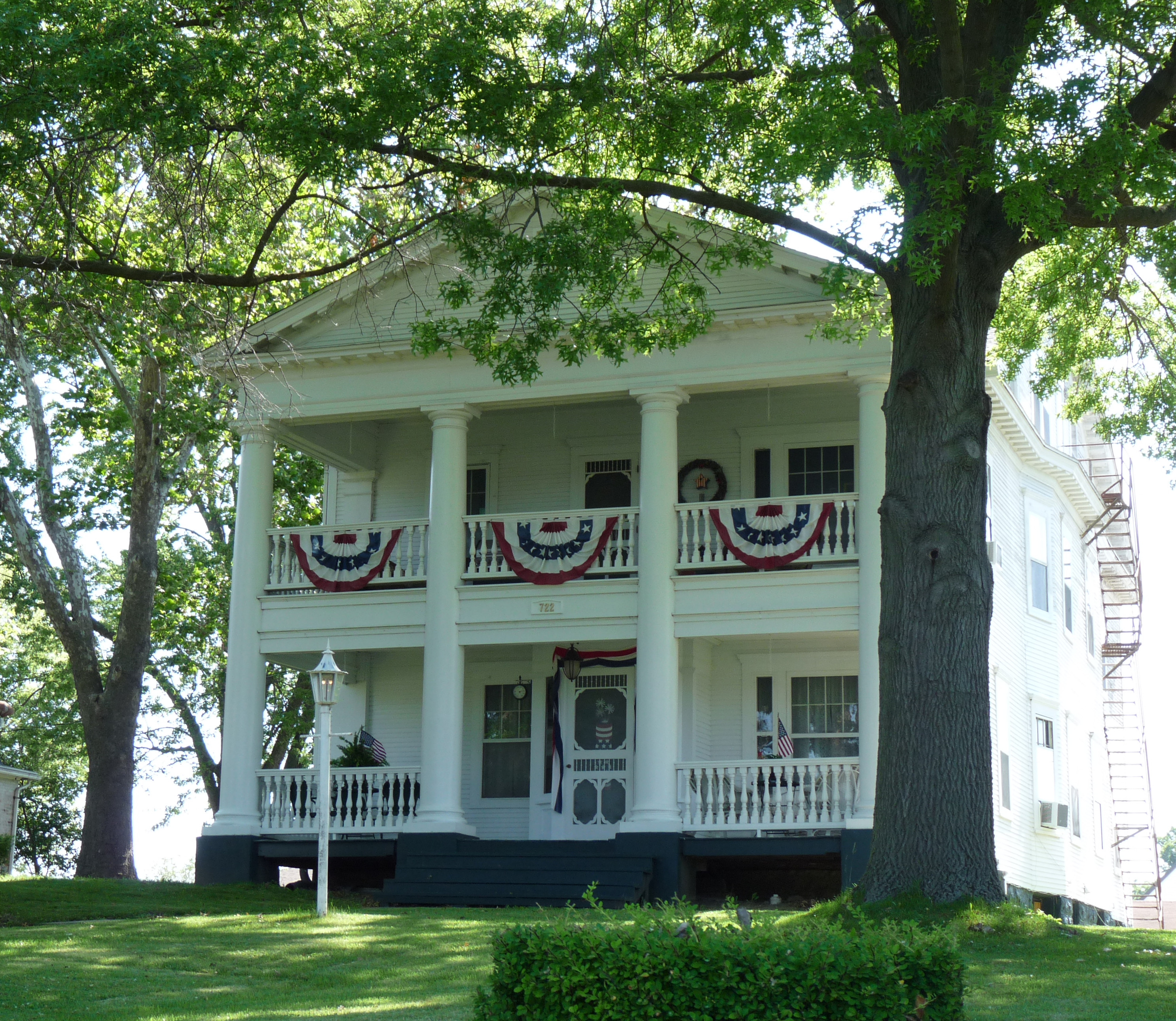
Fulton house, ca 1910, Neoclassical

- The Tabitha Fulton house at 718 N Court St was built around 1910 as a luxury apartment. Tabitha had it built so that she could move there, making space for her children and family in the 1860s brick Fulton house just to the north. The building's style is Neoclassical, with the two-story front portico somewhat suggesting a Greek temple with its colossal Doric columns and pediment.

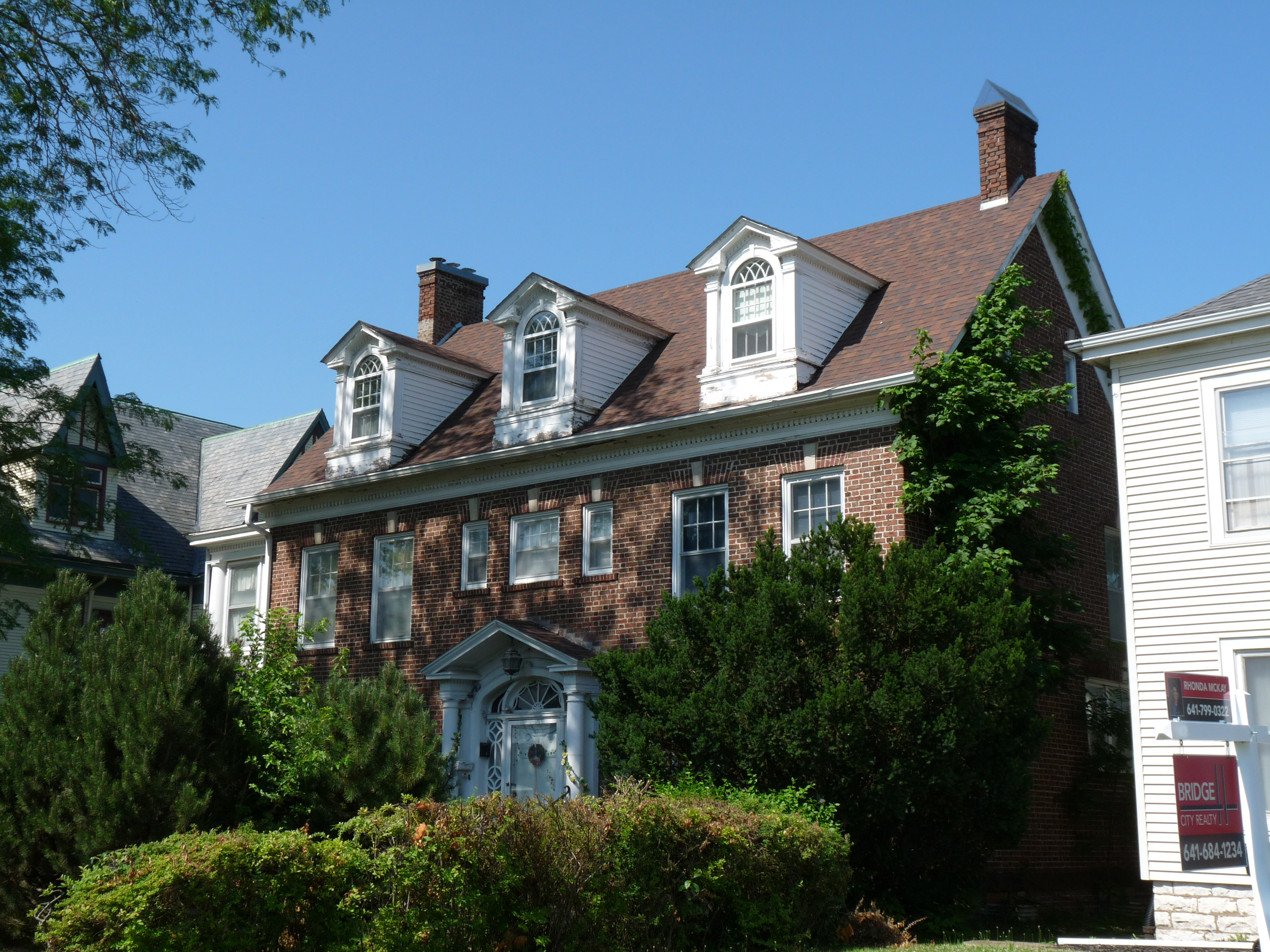
609 N Court St, 1910-1915, Colonial Revival

- The house at 609 N Court St was built between 1910 and 1915 in Colonial Revival style. Hallmarks of the style present in this house are the symmetry, the main entry framed by sidelights, fanlight, and porch with columns, the pilasters framing the dormers, and the dentils beneath the eaves.

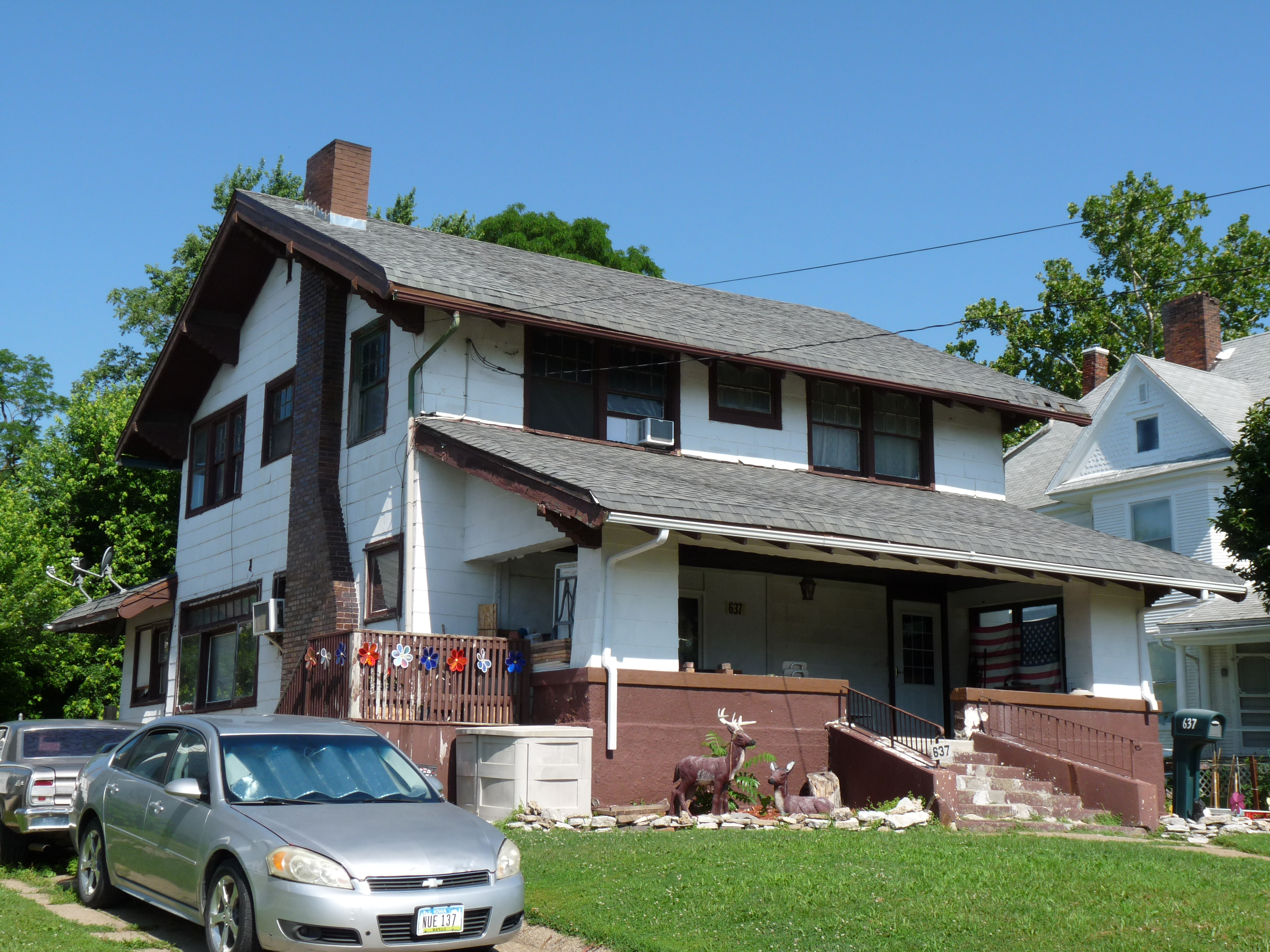
637 N Court St, 1910-1915, Craftsman

- The house at 637 N Court St was also built between 1910 and 1915, but it is in Craftsman style, whose hallmarks present in this house are the exposed rafter tales. The full-width side-gabled porch is also common to the style. Unusual is the simulation of a thatched roof with rolled shingles on the eaves. Craftsman houses were considered modern and convenient at the time - modern because they didn't mimic historic styles from other places.
