= George M. Kerns =

American architect

George M. Kerns (1871-1941 or 1942) was an architect in Iowa.

He was born in Moline, Illinois. He opened private practice in Ottumwa, Iowa in 1902.

A number of his works are listed on the U.S. National Register of Historic Places.

Works include (with spelling and other variations in attribution):

- B'nai Jacob Synagogue, 529 E. Main, Ottumwa, IA (Kerns, George M.), NRHP-listed
- One or more works in Court Hill Historic District, 111 E. Court and 407-1004 N. Court Sts., Ottumwa, IA (Kerns, George), NRHP-listed
- Dahlonega School No. 1, Cty. Rd. H25, 2 mi. NE of Ottumwa, Ottumwa, IA (Kerns, George M.), NRHP-listed
- J.W. Garner Building, 222-224 E. 2nd St., Ottumwa, IA (Kerns, George M.), NRHP-listed
- R. B. and Lizzie L. Louden House, 107 W. Washington Ave., Fairfield, IA (Kerns, G.M.), NRHP-listed
- Ottumwa Cemetery Gateway and Office, (1906–08) within Ottumwa Cemetery Historic District, 1302 North Ct., Ottumwa, IA (Kerns, George M.), NRHP-listed
- Ottumwa County Club buildings (c. 1910)
- Ottumwa National Guard Armory (1934)
- Peoples National Bank Building-Fries Building, 1729-1731 and 1723-1727 2nd Ave., Rock Island, IL (Kerns, George M.), NRHP-listed
- Russell Harper Residence (1915) within the Vogel Place Historic District, roughly bounded by Ottumwa Country Club, Court St., Ottumwa Cemetery and former St. Joseph Hospital, Ottumwa, IA (Kerns, George M.), NRHP-listed
