= Darla Moore =

American investor and philanthropist (born 1954)

- Born: Darla Dee Moore; August 1, 1954 (age 72); Lake City, South Carolina, U.S.
- Education: University of South Carolina; George Washington University
- Occupations: Financier, philanthropist
- Spouse: Richard Rainwater

Darla Dee Moore (born August 1, 1954) is an American investor and philanthropist. She is the former president and a partner of the private investment firm Rainwater Inc. and was married to Richard Rainwater, who founded the firm.

== Early life and education ==
Moore was born in Lake City, South Carolina, to Eugene and Loraine Moore. She was one of two daughters and was born on a farm that produced cotton, soybeans, and tobacco. Her father was a schoolteacher and coach and her mother worked at the Methodist Church. In 1972, Moore completed her high school education from Lake City High school. She graduated at the University of South Carolina in 1975 with a BA in political science.

== Career ==
=== Early career ===
Moore started her career in 1976, working for the Republican National Committee in Washington, D.C., but decided that politics was not the field she wanted to pursue. In 1981, Moore then received an MBA from George Washington University and then joined the training program at Chemical Bank. She was a managing director.

During the 1980s, Moore made a name for herself while providing debtor-in-possession financing for companies going through the bankruptcy process, specializing in bankruptcy takeovers for the company. In 1996, after running the company that he founded into deep financial trouble, T. Boone Pickens was removed by Moore as the head of Mesa Inc, which mainly dealt with the production of oil and natural gas. Once in control, she made a profit off the company after investing a total of $66 million.

Moore was recognized in several media outlets including Forbes, Fortune, Working Woman, Worth, The Wall Street Journal, and CNN. Her cover on Fortune magazine called her "The Toughest Babe in Business". She is credited with dismissing future Florida Governor Rick Scott from Columbia/HCA when a Medicare-related scandal broke.

=== Rainwater, Inc. ===
By 1991, Moore was the highest paid woman in the finance industry. That year, she became vice president of Rainwater, Inc., an investment company founded by her husband Richard Rainwater. She was named president of the company in 1993, and became CEO in 1994. She was known for her tough and decisive business strategy, with CNN Money journalist Patricia Sellers describing her as "a cross between the Terminator and Kim Basinger, with a wicked South Carolina drawl. Upon first meeting, she can come across as a prima donna, tough and aloof. As she warms up she can turn fun and flirty, even girlish, though the shift is deceptive." Moore remained at Rainwater Inc. until 2012.

=== Boards ===
Moore is one of the board members of The Shed. She has been on the boards of various organizations, including the Hospital Corporation of America, Martha Stewart Living Omnimedia, South Financial Group, The University of South Carolina, MPS Group, National Advisory Board of JP Morgan, Vice Chair on the Board of Trustees New York University School of Medicine and Hospital, Teach for America, and Lebanese American University of Beirut.

== Philanthropy ==
Moore started the nonprofit Darla Moore Foundation, Charleston Parks Conservancy, and the Palmetto Institute, an independent non-profit organization focused on increasing the wealth of every person in South Carolina. The Darla Moore Foundation has supported American Battlefield Trust and the South Carolina Battleground Preservation Trust, which preserves and interprets historical battlegrounds.

In 2012, she donated $1 million to Claflin University's music department. When giving this award, Moore stated, "This is an investment, and with investments, you not only expect a return, you do your homework up front to ensure you get a solid return. This is what I desire with my investment- the opportunity to open the door to success to as many young people as possible."

In 2021, she established the Darla Moore Scholarship at Francis Marion University through a $5 million gift.

=== University of South Carolina ===
She is the largest benefactor in the history of the University of South Carolina, and her combined donations to the university constitute nearly a record-breaking amount for a private donation to a business school. In 1998, she donated $25 million to the business school at the University of South Carolina, which was renamed the Moore School of Business. She donated an additional $45 million to the Moore School of Business in 2005. In addition to the Moore School of Business at the University of South Carolina, Moore also has a summer business program and camp called the Wachovia Scholars Business for high school students to attend.

Moore was on the University of South Carolina board until 2011, when she was removed by Governor Nikki Haley. That year, Moore donated $5 million to establish the McNair Center for Aerospace Innovation and Research Center at the University of South Carolina, which was named in honor of Ronald McNair, an astronaut from Lake City who died aboard the Space Shuttle Challenger mission of 1986. She convinced Haley and the South Carolina state legislature to match her $5 million donation to the aerospace center.

=== Clemson University ===
In 2003, Moore donated $10 million to the School of Education at Clemson University, which was renamed the Eugene T. Moore School of Education in honor of her father, a Clemson alumnus and former teacher, coach, and principal in Lake City. Moore's gift to Clemson's education program and the legacy of her father pushed for the start of a Creative Inquiry Program at Clemson University in the fall of 2013 called the Moore Scholars Program. The purpose of this program is for education majors at Clemson University to participate in case studies and research regarding underprivileged schools and students.

=== Lake City ===
In 2006, Moore began restoring her hometown, Lake City, South Carolina. Her first project began with the renovation of the historic Bean Market building, after which she began organizing infrastructural improvements to other parts of the town's downtown. One of her largest projects was the $25 million renovation of an old WalMart building into The Continuum, a 46,000 sq. ft. regional education center. The center was founded through a partnership between the Darla Moore Foundation, Florence–Darlington Technical College and Francis Marion University. It provides education, technical training and workforce development, awarding course credits that can be applied towards high school diplomas, certificates, two-year degrees and four year-degrees.

=== ArtFields ===
In 2013, Moore founded the annual ArtFields festival in Lake City, which she supports through the Darla Moore Foundation.

Moore created the festival to reinvent Lake City as a cultural hub, after the town experienced economic decline. The first festival attracted an estimated 10,000 attendees, and had an estimated $5 million impact on the town through construction, tourism, and employment. The festival's impact on the town has been noted, resulting in the restoration of the downtown and the opening of art galleries, a history center, a boutique hotel, and other businesses.

The 17 day festival occurs every April, and awards over $100,000 in cash prizes to artists from the southeastern United States. In addition to the arts competition, the festival includes food, workshops, public art exhibitions, and other programs. The arts organization that supports ArtFields has since expanded to provide year-round events and programs.

=== Moore Farms Botanical Garden ===
In 2002, Moore established the nonprofit Moore Farms Botanical Garden on her family's former farmland in Lake City. It now covers over 1,000 acres of cultivated gardens and fields. Much of its grounds are organized into sections based on particular environments, such as Pine Bay, Vegetable Garden, Spring House, Green Roof, and Bog Garden. It also has historic railroad buildings and barns.

The gardens host annual events including a beer festival and plant sales, with all ticket proceeds being donated to nonprofits that support the Lake City community. It hosts field trips for students, summer camps, and adult classes to engage the local community. In 2019, it received over 14,000 visitors. Moore Farms also conducts horticultural projects like plantings in other public spaces throughout Lake City.

It has thousands of plant species in its collections, with its two largest collections being Taxodium and Magnolia grandiflora. The Magnolia grandiflora collection currently has over 50 different cultivars and was established to preserve its diversity. The taxodium collection currently holds 59 total taxa of Taxodium –two of the straight varieties (T. distichum var. distichum, and T. distichum var. mexicanum), 38 species cultivars, four hybrid cultivars and 14 selections under evaluation.

== Awards and recognition ==
Fortune magazine named Moore one of the 50 Most Powerful Women In Business in 1998 and 1999. Additionally in 1998, Moore was presented with the Order of the Palmetto. In 2005, Moore was named Business Leader of the Year by the South Carolina Chamber of Commerce and in 2007, she was inducted into the South Carolina Business Hall of Fame. In 1997, Moore became the first woman to be on the cover of Fortune as "The Toughest Babe In Business", and was also named one of the Top 50 Most Powerful Women in American Business by the publication.

In 2002, Moore received an honorary doctorate from Converse University. Moore was included in historian Valinda W. Littlefield's 101 Women Who Shaped South Carolina (2020).

== Personal life ==
Moore met Richard Rainwater on a business trip to Texas. In 1991, they were married in New York City in Park Avenue's Brick Presbyterian Church. Rainwater's net worth almost tripled due to his marriage to Moore, whose net worth was estimated at $2.3 billion in 2012.

From 2001 forward Moore and Rainwater lived separately, she in South Carolina, he in Texas and California. In March 2011, a court declared him incapacitated as a result of his battle with progressive supranuclear palsy (PSP), and his youngest child, Matthew, became his legal guardian. As his illness progressed, Rainwater's primary caregiver was his brother Walter until around-the-clock nursing care became necessary. Rainwater died September 27, 2015. He was survived by his former wife, his son Todd, and two other children, Matthew and Courtney, from an earlier marriage.

Since around 2008, Moore spends most of her time in Lake City, South Carolina, in a 1918 house built on a plantation that has been in the Moore family for six generations. She turned the farmland on the property into the Moore Farms Botanical Garden. In 2021, a fire destroyed the home.

She also owns homes in New York City and Folsom, California. She previously owned a home in Charleston, South Carolina. Her hobbies include being a collector, mostly of 18th-century French furniture, rare books, and contemporary art. In addition, Moore enjoyed riding with her husband in his 1957 Chevy before his illness began. Moore has one sister, Lisa.

In 2012, Moore and former Secretary of State Condoleezza Rice became the first two female members of Augusta National Golf Club. Prior to her invitation, Moore was known to have a friendship with one of the former chairmen of Augusta, Hootie Johnson. It was her husband, Rainwater, who originally introduced Moore to the game of golf, after they first met in the early 1990s. Moore has described her excitement to join the club in a statement to The New York Times, stating:

I am honored to have accepted an invitation to join Augusta National Golf Club ... Augusta National has always captured my imagination, and is one of the most magically beautiful places in the world, as everyone gets to see during the Masters each April. I am fortunate to have many friends who are members at Augusta National, so to be asked to join them as a member represents a very happy and important occasion in my life. Above all, Augusta National and the Masters tournament have always stood for excellence, and that is what is so important to me. I am extremely grateful for this privilege.
