= Dahlonega School No. 1 =

- U.S. National Register of Historic Places
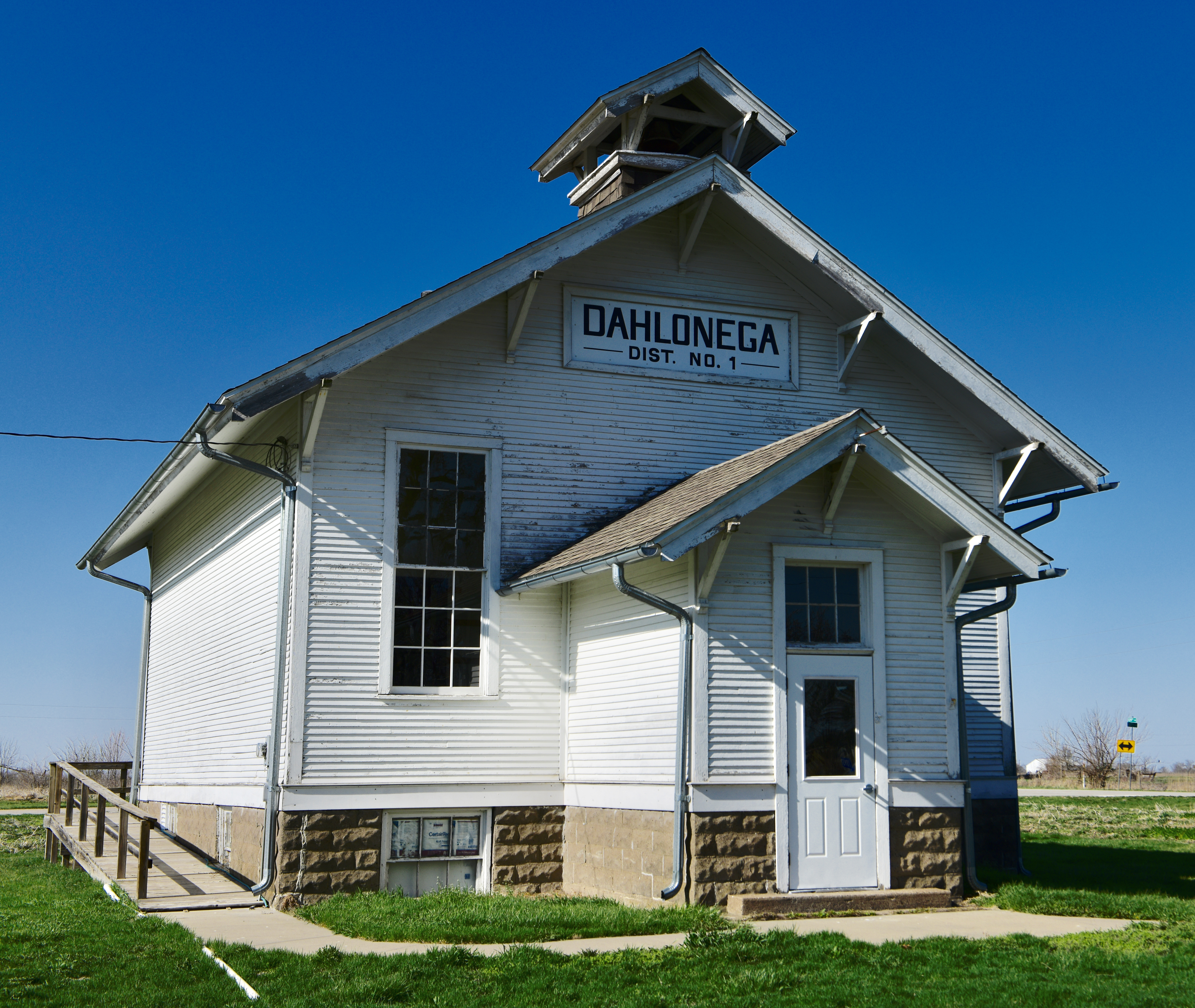

- Location within Iowa Location within the United States
- Location: County Road H25, 2 miles northeast of Ottumwa, Iowa
- Coordinates: 41°3′30″N 92°22′13″W
- Built: 1921
- Built by: John F. Quinn
- Architect: George M. Kerns
- Architectural style: Bungalow; American Craftsman
- NRHP reference No.: 00000934
- Added to NRHP: August 10, 2000

Dahlonega School No. 1 is a historic school building located near Ottumwa, Iowa, United States. It is located in the center of the unincorporated community of Dahlonega. The building was completed in 1921 and served as a school building until 1959. It served as a voting place for the township until 1986. The one-room schoolhouse measures 1,100 square feet (100 m^{2}). The property was listed on the National Register of Historic Places in 2000.
