= List of botanical gardens and arboretums in South Carolina =

This list of botanical gardens and arboretums in South Carolina is intended to include all significant botanical gardens and arboretums in the U.S. state of South Carolina.

Name	Image	Affiliation	City	Coordinates
W. Gordon Belser Arboretum		University of South Carolina	Columbia	33°59′35.16″N 80°59′4.92″W
Brookgreen Gardens			Pawleys Island	33°31′14″N 79°5′59″W
Coastal Carolina University Arboretum		Coastal Carolina University	Conway	
Cypress Gardens			Moncks Corner	33°3′23″N 79°57′21″W
Furman University Asian Garden		Furman University	Greenville	34°55′43″N 82°26′12″W
Kalmia Gardens		Coker College	Hartsville	34°21′57.96″N 80°6′59.04″W
Magnolia Plantation and Gardens			Charleston	32°52′32″N 80°05′00″W
Medical University of South Carolina Arboretum		Medical University of South Carolina	Charleston	32°47′3″N 79°57′3″W
Mepkin Abbey Botanical Garden			Moncks Corner	33°6′57.6″N 79°57′7.2″W
Middleton Place			Charleston	32°53′59″N 80°8′12″W
Moore Farms Botanical Garden			Lake City	33°51′41.36″N 79°49′22.16″W
Park Seed Company Gardens			Greenwood	34°16′15.24″N 82°11′48.48″W
Riverbanks Zoo and Garden			Columbia	34°0′34.75″N 81°4′20.77″W
South Carolina Botanical Garden		Clemson University	Clemson	34°40′24.96″N 82°49′25.68″W
Summerville Azalea Park			Summerville	33°0′29″N 80°10′58″W
Swan Lake Iris Gardens			Sumter	33°55′10.4″N 80°22′14.65″W
Wells Japanese Garden			Newberry	34°16′42″N 81°37′11″W

== See also ==
- List of botanical gardens and arboretums in the United States
