= R. B. and Lizzie L. Louden House =

Historic house in Iowa, United States

- U.S. National Register of Historic Places
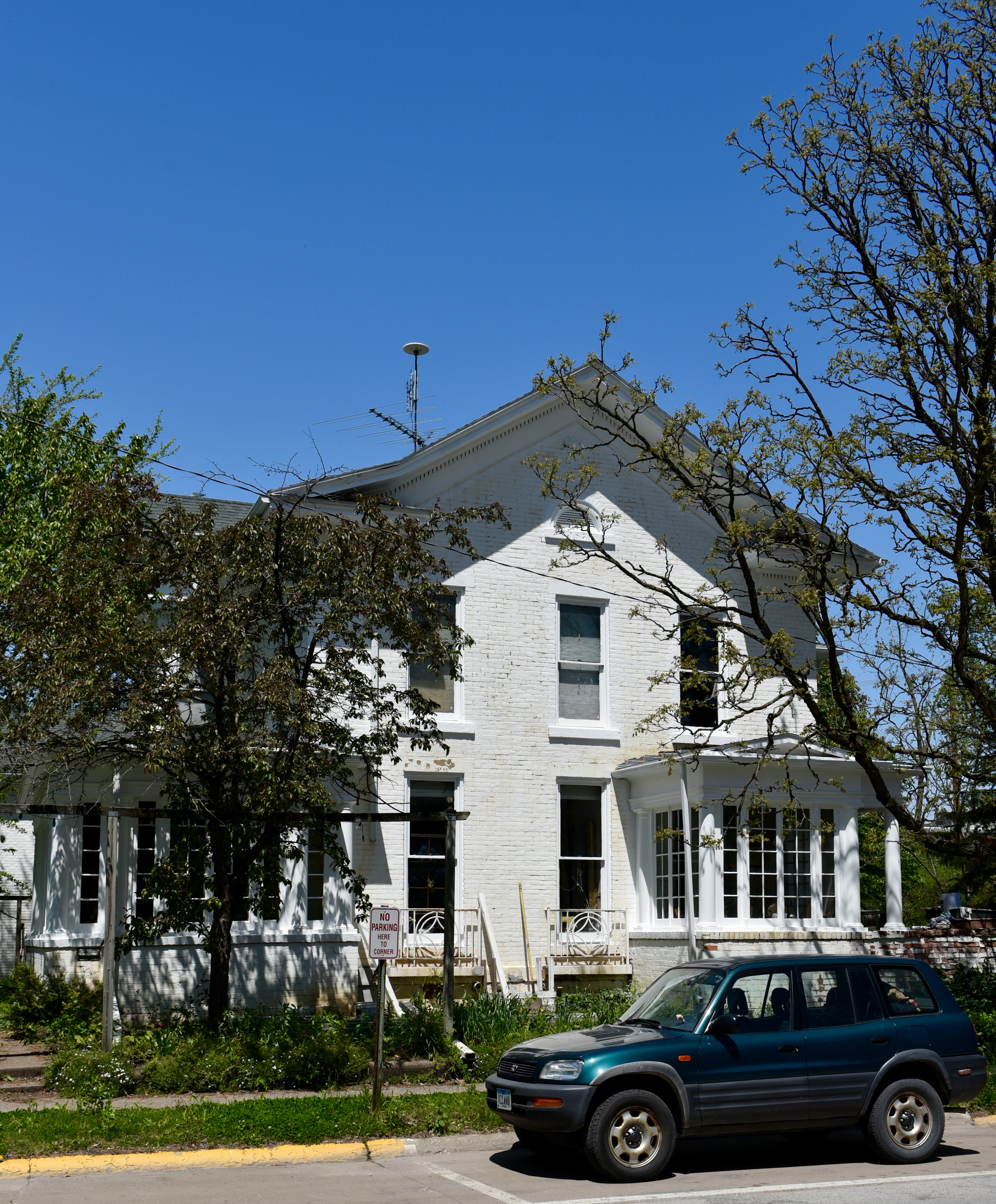

- Location within Iowa Location within the United States
- Location: 107 W. Washington Ave., Fairfield, Iowa
- Coordinates: 41°0′21″N 91°57′53″W
- Area: less than one acre (0.40 ha)
- Built: 1871; 155 years ago
- Architect: G.M. Kerns
- Architectural style: Late 19th and 20th Century Revivals
- MPS: Louden Machinery Company, Fairfield Iowa MPS
- NRHP reference No.: 99000125
- Added to NRHP: February 22, 1999

The R. B. and Lizzie L. Louden House, also known as the William and Susan F. Elliott House and the John and Gladdy Ball House, is a historic residence located in Fairfield, Iowa, United States.

The single family dwelling was built in 1871 for William and Susan Elliott. Its historical significance derives from its association with R. B. Louden, who served as the president of the Louden Machinery Company from 1899 through 1939 and his residence here. He and his wife Lizzie substantially remodeled the house in 1900 and 1929, which gives it its eclectic appearance. Their additions include two enclosed porches and a sleeping porch designed by Ottumwa, Iowa architect George M. Kerns.

The historic designation includes the 2½-story brick house and the 2-story, brick, double garage in the back. It was listed on the National Register of Historic Places in 1999.
