= Moore Farms Botanical Garden =

Garden in Lake City, South Carolina, United States

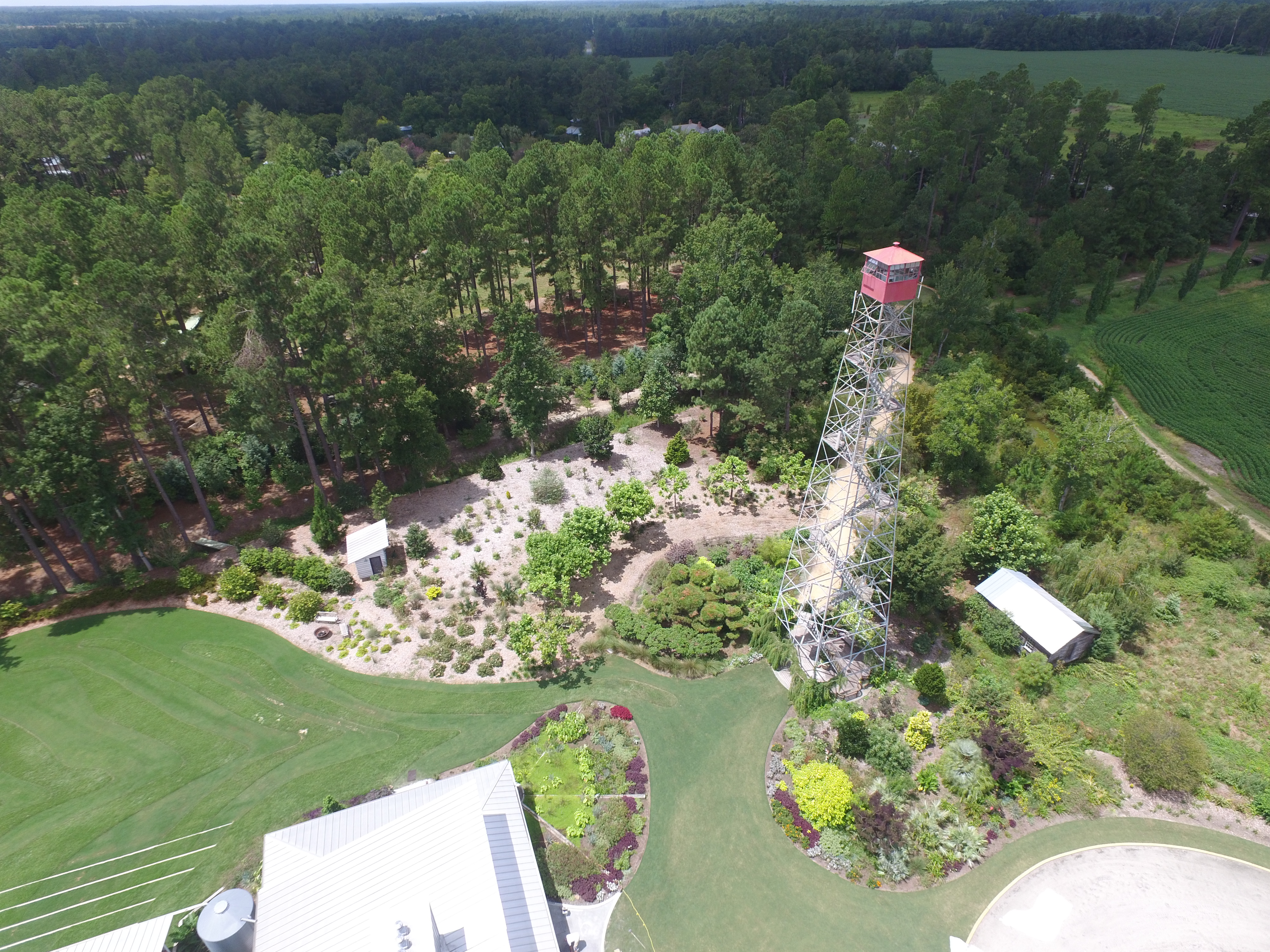

- Location within South Carolina
- Location: Lake City, South Carolina, United States
- Coordinates: 33°52′06″N 79°49′24″W
- Area: 50 acres (20 ha)
- Elevation: 25 m (82 ft)
- Established: 2002
- Founder: Darla Moore
- Status: Private non-profit with select open days
- Collections: South Carolina Native plants, Southern Heritage plants, Magnolia grandiflora
- Website: www.moorefarmsbg.org

Moore Farms Botanical Garden is a botanical garden located in Lake City, South Carolina in the Pee Dee region. Founded in 2002, the garden consists of 65 acres (26 ha) of cultivated gardens and pastoral fields. It also serves as a center for research, education, and community outreach.

== History ==
Moore Farms Botanical Garden was founded in 2002 by benefactor and South Carolina native Darla Moore on her family's farm in Lake City, SC. The garden's location is nestled within existing farmlands consisting of corn, soybeans, cotton, and formerly tobacco, and pine plantations mostly of Pinus taeda, loblolly pine.

The garden's central landmark is the firetower, which soars to a height of 100 ft (30 m) and was purchased during an auction in Olanta, South Carolina in 2004. Three years later, construction was completed on the Firetower Center, which serves as the garden's visitors center, and houses offices, education, and event space.

== Geography and climate ==
Due to its location in the inner Atlantic coastal plain, the topography of the garden is flat, with a low elevation and little change in relief. As is characteristic for the Southeastern United States, the garden has a humid subtropical climate (Köppen climate classification Cfa), with hot, humid summers and relatively mild winters. The region is classified as USDA Hardiness Zone 8a.

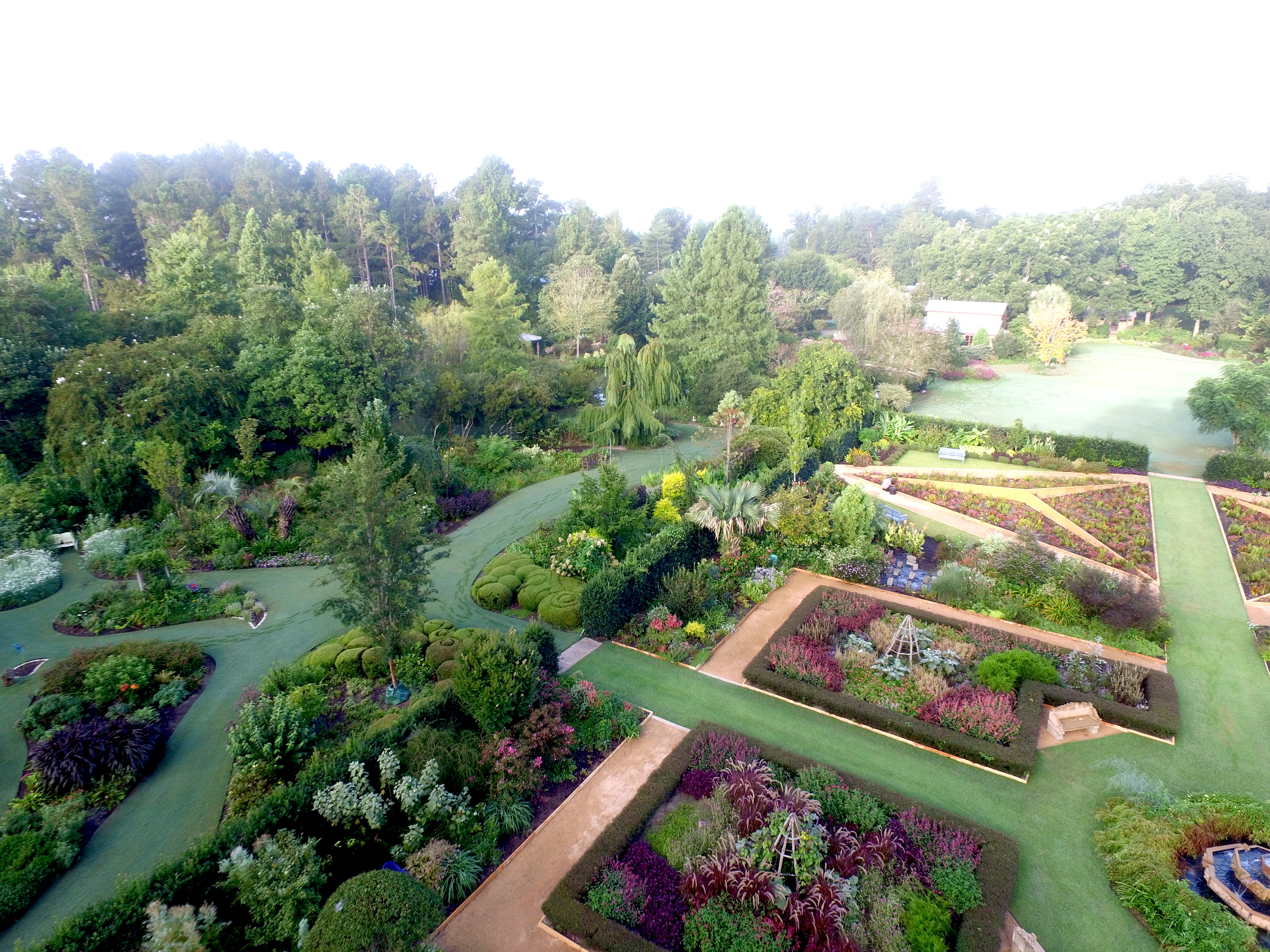
View of the Formal Garden

== Visitation ==
The garden is not open to the public on a daily basis. Moore Farms Botanical Garden can be visited by request through a guided tour, open garden days, and during one of the many seasonal events.

== Plant collections ==
=== Collections management ===
Plant records are maintained through an internally designed Filemaker Pro database. The database, including a plant inventory and observational and horticultural notes dating back to the garden's founding, is accessible to the public via the Moore Farms Botanical Garden’s website. Voucher specimens from plants accessioned at the garden are housed at the A.C. Moore Herbarium (USCH) at the University of South Carolina.

=== South Carolina natives ===
The garden engages in plant collecting throughout the state with the goal of building a diverse assemblage of South Carolina native plants from several localities, including several rare or little known species. Plants are collected with the goal of germplasm preservation or horticultural introduction. The coastal plain ecosystem is the primary focus of the collection, though the piedmont and mountain regions of the state are represented as well. Examples include Helianthus angustifolius, Symphyotrichum georgianum, and Macbridea caroliniana.

=== Southern heritage plants ===
A collection considering of plants historically cultivated in the Southeastern United States and considered part of its distinct imagery, including Camellia, Chrysanthemum, Crinum, Magnolia, Quercus virginiana (southern live oak), and Narcissus (particularly the 'Jonquils', or those in Division 7 of the Royal Horticultural Society classification of the group, derived from and showing characteristics of Narcissus Sect. Jonquilla and/or Narcissus Sect. Apodanthi).

=== Magnolia grandiflora cultivars ===
Both a plant native to the southeast and one long cultivated there for its ornamental value, Magnolia grandiflora (southern magnolia) is a high priority plant for collection at Moore Farms Botanical Garden. Currently, 68 different cultivars and an additional 17 unnamed hybrids of the species are represented.

=== Taxodium cultivars ===
In 2017, Moore Farms Botanical Garden completed the planting of its Taxodium collection. Boasting approximately 61 cultivars, varieties, and hybrids consisting of the three recognized species, Taxodium ascendens, Taxodium distichum, and Taxodium mucronatum.

== Garden areas ==
Moore Farms Botanical Garden has a diverse assemblage of garden areas ranging from formal to naturalistic in appearance. The garden areas are designed with an appreciation for the pastoral history of the Pee Dee Region, with signature views of extensive agricultural fields common from various vantage points throughout the garden.

=== Firetower and gardens ===
The Firetower Garden is named for its central landmark, a 100-foot-tall (30 m) fire lookout tower which was purchased on auction and moved to the garden in 2004. Though no longer utilized for fire spotting, the tower serves as a trellis for specimens of Taxodium distichum 'Emerald Falls', trained to climb by staff horticulturists. A bog garden abutting the fire tower collects several species of Pitcher plant (Sarracenia). The Firetower Center houses offices and education classes, and serves to welcome visitors. Other plants of note in the Firetower Garden include Chamaerops humilis var. cerifera and Albizia julibrissin 'Summer Chocolate'.

=== Pine Bay ===
A former plantation for Pinus taeda (Loblolly Pine), the Pine Bay is the most naturalistic area of the garden and serves to exhibit over 400 taxa of South Carolina native flora including Amorpha georgiana, Erythrina herbacea, and Salix humilis var. tristis.

=== Formal Garden ===
The Formal Garden includes several hedges of Ilex vomitoria (Yaupon) and less commonly hedged species such as Laurus nobilis. The formal garden is bordered by the Vegetable and Cut Flower gardens. This region of the garden also exhibits several specimens by local South Carolina topiary artist Pearl Fryar. Several Crinum selections (including 'Summer Nocturne' and 'Rose Parade') are also cultivated within this region.

=== Spring House and Pond Gardens ===
The characteristic structure of this area is the Spring House, constructed with timber from a neighboring county, Bamboo (Phyllostachys sp.) grown onsite, and topped by a reed grass thatched roof. Nearby ponds collect several aquatic and marginal species including Scirpus californicus, Eryngium aquaticum, and Glyptostrobus pensilis.

=== Green roof and living wall ===
The maintenance building holds a 6,000-square-foot (560 m^{2}) intensive green roof utilized both as a landscape, and as a research plot. The roof has a 4:12 pitch and is designed as a multi-layered system consisting of plants, six in (15 cm) of an engineered lightweight soil, a soil retention system, root barrier, drainage mat, and waterproofing membrane. The roof is irrigated by spray emitters and above surface drip systems. The irrigation system draws water from an underground cistern, with the intent that captured stormwater exclusively is utilized to water the plants. Plants providing ornamental interest in all four seasons are represented on the roof, with some of the dominant plantings including Tulipa clusiana, Yucca gloriosa, Commelina erecta, Asclepias curassavica, and Eschscholzia californica. The green roof was installed in 2011. A custom, in-house designed living wall was installed on the maintenance building in 2013.

== Production facilities ==
Moore Farms Botanical Garden grows many of the plants for collection onsite, with an annual production of 30,000 plants. The production facility was constructed in 2006. Current plans involve expansion of the nursery and construction of additional greenhouses, one for vegetable production as well as installation of a trial garden for expanded research.

== Outreach ==
Moore Farms Botanical Garden is frequently involved in outreach and improvement projects in Lake City, and is often utilized as a site for events in support of these causes.

== See also ==
- List of botanical gardens and arboretums in South Carolina
