= Helmut Belser =

World War II Luftwaffe fighter ace

- Born: 23 December 1915; Stuttgart
- Died: 19 June 1942 (aged 26); Castel-Benito
- Military career
- Allegiance: Nazi Germany
- Branch: Luftwaffe
- Service years: 1939–1942
- Rank: Hauptmann (captain)
- Unit: JG 53
- Commands: 8./JG 53
- Conflicts: World War II: Defense of the Reich; Operation Barbarossa; Siege of Malta; North African Campaign
- Awards: Knight's Cross of the Iron Cross

Helmut Belser (23 December 1915 – 19 June 1942) was a German Luftwaffe ace and recipient of the Knight's Cross of the Iron Cross. The Knight's Cross of the Iron Cross, and its variants were the highest awards in the military and paramilitary forces of Nazi Germany during World War II. Belser claimed 36 aerial victories, 1 over the Western Front and 12 over the Eastern Front and 23 over the Mediterranean Front. Belser was killed in a flying accident 19 June 1942 at the Castel-Benito Airfield.

== Career ==
On 2 December 1941, II. Gruppe of JG 53 moved to the Mediterranean theater and where then based at Comiso airfield during the siege of Malta. Here on 29 December, Belser claimed his first aerial victory in this theater of operation. Escorting Junkers Ju 88 bombers on a mission to attack two destroyers in Valletta harbor, Belser claimed a Hawker Hurricane fighter shot down.

=== Squadron leader and death ===
On 8 March 1942, Belser was appointed Staffelkapitän (squadron leader) of 8. Staffel of JG 53. He succeeded Oberleutnant Hans-Joachim Heinecke who was transferred. In his book series Jagdgeschwader 53: A History of the "Pik As" Geschwader, Prien states that Belser was first made Staffelkapitän of 6. Staffel, succeeding Oberleutnant Otto Böhner who was slightly wounded, on 8 March. Belser then transferred to III. Gruppe in April where he was given command of 8. Staffel.

On 20 May, III. Gruppe was transferred from Sicily to North Africa where the Gruppe was initially based at Martuba Airbase and placed under the command of Major Erich Gerlitz. On 14 June, Belser shot down the Bristol Beaufighter T4885/F from No. 272 Squadron.

On 19 June at 11:45, Belser was killed in a flying accident at Castel-Benito Airfield. His Messerschmitt Bf 109 F-4 trop (Werknummer 10278—factory) flipped over during takeoff, burning him to death in the resulting fire. In consequence, command of 3. Staffel was passed on to Oberleutnant Ernst Klager. Posthumously, he was awarded the Knight's Cross of the Iron Cross (Ritterkreuz des Eisernen Kreuzes) on 6 September 1942 for his 36 aerial victories claimed.

== Summary of career ==
=== Aerial victory claims ===
According to Obermaier, Belser was credited with 36 aerial victories, 12 of which on the Eastern Front and 24 over the Western Allies. Mathews and Foreman, authors of Luftwaffe Aces — Biographies and Victory Claims, researched the German Federal Archives and found records for 36 aerial victory claims. This number includes one claim during the Battle of Britain, 24 on the Eastern Front, and 23 in the Mediterranean Theater including one heavy bomber.

Victory claims were logged to a map-reference (PQ = Planquadrat), for example "PQ 14 West 2734". The Luftwaffe grid map (Jägermeldenetz) covered all of Europe, western Russia and North Africa and was composed of rectangles measuring 15 minutes of latitude by 30 minutes of longitude, an area of about 360 square miles (930 km^{2}). These sectors were then subdivided into 36 smaller units to give a location area 3 km × 4 km (1.9 mi × 2.5 mi) in size.

Chronicle of aerial victories
This and the ? (question mark) indicates information discrepancies listed by Prien, Stemmer, Rodeike, Bock, Mathews and Foreman.
Claim	Date	Time	Type	Location	Claim	Date	Time	Type	Location
– 2. Ergänzungsjagdgruppe of Jagdgeschwader 53 – Action at the Channel and over England — July 1941
1	24 July 1941	14:55	Halifax	PQ 14 West 2734					
– 5. Staffel of Jagdgeschwader 53 – Operation Barbarossa — September – 8 October 1941
2	4 September 1941	11:05	DB-3		8	21 September 1941	14:40	I-18 (MiG-1)	
3	8 September 1941	11:20	I-18 (MiG-1)		9	22 September 1941	14:15	SB-2	
4	10 September 1941	18:05	I-16		10	23 September 1941	14:45	Pe-2	
5	11 September 1941	09:06	SB-3		11	27 September 1941	16:36	I-153	
6	11 September 1941	09:11	SB-3		12	30 September 1941	13:10	I-180 (Yak-7)	
7	16 September 1941	10:57	I-16		13	3 October 1941	09:58	I-18 (MiG-1)	
– 6. Staffel of Jagdgeschwader 53 – Mediterranean Theater — 15 December 1941 – 7 March 1942
14	29 December 1941	10:10	Hurricane	Malta	17	27 January 1942	17:30	Battle	
15	4 January 1942	10:25	Hurricane	southeast of Malta	18	7 February 1942	11:32	Blenheim	Luqa
16	19 January 1942	13:45	Gladiator						
– 8. Staffel of Jagdgeschwader 53 – Mediterranean Theater — 8 March – 19 June 1942
19	15 March 1942	11:10	Spitfire		28	30 May 1942	14:35	P-40	30 km (19 mi) southeast of Ayn al-Ġazāla
20	1 April 1942	17:01	Spitfire		29	31 May 1942	07:42	P-40	southwest of Fort Acroma
21	9 April 1942	17:27	Spitfire	2 km (1.2 mi) east of Valletta	30	3 June 1942	12:25	P-40	
22	21 April 1942	12:55	Spitfire		31	3 June 1942	12:28	P-40	
23	23 April 1942	16:40	Hurricane		32	7 June 1942	16:11	P-40	5 km (3.1 mi) southwest of Al Adm
24	26 April 1942	15:15	Spitfire		33	14 June 1942	11:45	P-40	
25	9 May 1942	18:16	Spitfire	1 km (0.62 mi) south of Qrendi; 1 km (0.62 mi) south of Pirte di Krendi	34	15 June 1942	07:28	Beaufort	130 km (81 mi) north-northeast of Derna
26	12 May 1942	11:40	Spitfire		35	15 June 1942	07:30	Beaufort	130 km (81 mi) north-northeast of Derna
27	14 May 1942	17:53? (Note: According to Mathews and Foreman claimed at 17:33.)	Spitfire		36	15 June 1942	07:38	Beaufort	130 km (81 mi) north-northeast of Derna

=== Awards ===
- Iron Cross (1939)
  - 2nd Class
  - 1st Class (29 September 1941)
- Honor Goblet of the Luftwaffe on 11 May 1942 as Hauptmann and pilot
- German Cross in Gold on 4 August 1942 as Hauptmann in the 8./Jagdgeschwader 53
- Knight's Cross of the Iron Cross on 6 September 1942 as Hauptmann and Staffelkapitän of the 3./Jagdgeschwader 53 (Note: According to Scherzer as Staffelkapitän of the 8./Jagdgeschwader 53.)
- Mentioned in the Wehrmachtbericht on 21 June 1942
