= Darla Moore School of Business =

Business school of the University of South Carolina

- Type: Public
- Established: 1919
- Endowment: US$228,900,502 (As of 2024)
- Dean: Gregory Niehaus (Interim)
- Faculty: 200
- Undergraduates: 5,500
- Postgraduates: 800
- Location: Columbia, South Carolina, USA; 33°59′41″N 81°02′00″W
- Campus: Urban
- Mascot: Cocky
- Website: sc.edu/study/colleges_schools/moore

The Darla Moore School of Business is the official business school of the University of South Carolina. Founded in 1919, the Moore School is located in Columbia, South Carolina and currently enrolls over 5,500 undergraduate and 800 graduate students in degree-seeking programs, including bachelor's, master's and doctorate degrees. The school is well known for its consistent high rankings in its program for international business.

== History ==
The University of South Carolina (USC) began efforts to open a school of commerce as early as 1914. USC founded the school in 1919 and dean George Olson firmly established the school by the early 1920s. The school grew with the university, and by 1958, the school established the Master of Business Administration program. By 1963, AACSB gave the school full accreditation.

The Professional Master of Business Administration (then called MBA-ETV) started in 1970. The Professional MBA program allows people in South Carolina to receive an MBA by taking part-time classes at remote locations and over the internet. Then in 1974 the school established its Master of International Business (MIBS). National publications hold the program in high esteem and the program continuously garners high rankings in international business.

In 1998, Wall Street financier and USC graduate Darla Moore donated $25 million to the business school. In her honor the school was renamed Darla Moore School of Business, although sometimes shortened to the Moore School.

The school combined its MIBS and MBA programs to form the International MBA program in 2002. The same year, the school started offering a specialization in international business for undergraduate students as a major.

On April 23, 2004, the Moore School announced another gift by Darla Moore. She donated $45 million with the challenge to the university to match that sum.

On September 22, 2011, the University of South Carolina broke ground on the new Darla Moore School of Business on Assembly Street next to the Carolina Coliseum. The new Darla Moore School of Business includes 35 classrooms and 136 offices for university faculty.

== Facilities ==
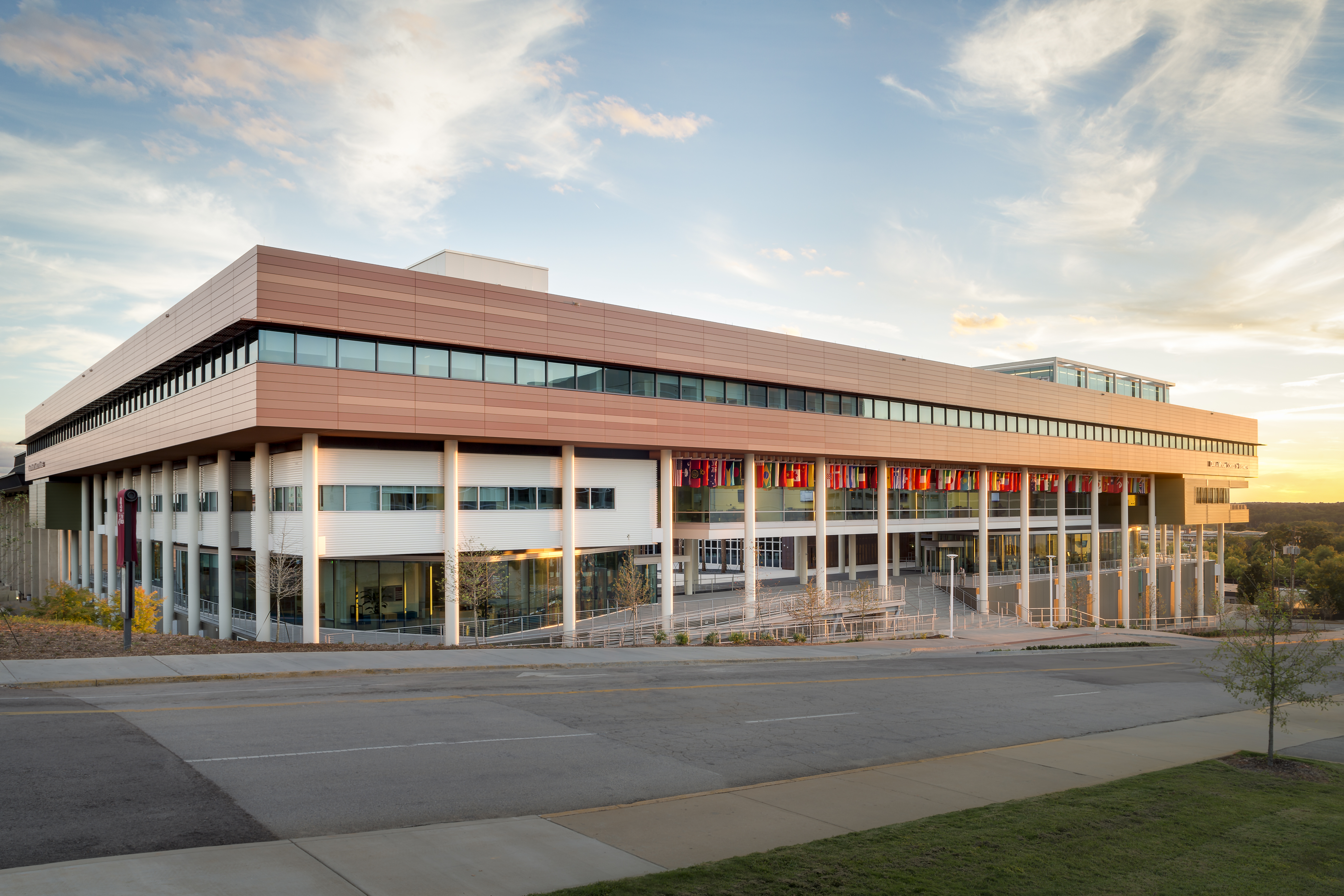
The new Darla Moore School of Business building

In August 2014, the Moore School took occupancy of its new home located at the corner of Assembly and Greene streets in downtown Columbia, SC.

The main level houses a visitors' center, a cafe, a trading room, and an open-air courtyard.

== Academics ==
=== Rank and reputation ===
U.S. News & World Report in its 2021 annual survey "America’s Best Colleges Guide" ranked the Moore School's undergraduate international business degree first in the United States. In the specialty of international business, the publication ranked the school No. 1 in the United States, a position the school has held for twenty-two years.

On the national level, in the latest ranking of graduate programs by U.S. News & World Report, the Moore School continued as the #1 American university in the international business category. The publication ranked the school #62 in the US in overall graduate business education. The Wall Street Journal ranked the Moore School 49th out of 51 national business schools in a "Regional Ranking" in the September 20, 2007, edition of the Journal. In the 2010 QS Global 200 Business Schools Report, the Darla Moore School of Business was placed 28th in North America. In the 2010 Public Accounting Report, the Masters of Accounting program was ranked 25th in the country.

=== Programs ===
==== Undergraduate ====
After four years of study, undergraduate students finish their careers at the Darla Moore School of Business with a Bachelor of Science in Business Administration degree. The program consists of 121 credit hours and combines a strong liberal arts background with practical business education. The core curriculum that every student studies includes marketing, management, finance and management science. After the core, usually in their junior year, students can choose a major or majors from the following areas: accounting, finance (corporate, investments, or financial services track), insurance and risk management, international business, management (entrepreneurship or human resources track), economics, marketing, management science (business information systems or global supply chain and operations management track), and real estate.

The Undergraduate International Business major at the Moore School solidifies its international business rankings.

==== Graduate ====
===== MBA programs =====
International MBA

The International Masters of Business Administration at the Darla Moore School of Business combines traditional business education with intensive language training in one of eight languages – Arabic, Chinese, French, German, Italian, Japanese, Portuguese, or Spanish. In addition to the language tracks, the global track allows students to study the business and cultural issues of regions around the world without learning a language other than English. All tracks are 20–22 months, with the exception of Arabic, Chinese, and Japanese, which require 29–34 months of study to give students added exposure to the more complex languages and cultures of these countries. Students may also volunteer with the Peace Corps during the IMBA program, extending the program length to approximately 48 months. Students must be accepted separately to the Peace Corps' Masters' International Program.

Students begin the program with an intensive core of business courses. The core lasts from July to December. In January, students begin language training in the country that natively speaks the language they are learning. Then around April 1, students begin a mandatory internship, ideally in the language they studied.

After their internships are completed, students in both the language and global tracks return to the Moore School to continue their business education. Students take elective classes during their final two semesters either at USC or they may choose to complete a one-semester exchange.

Professional MBA

The Moore School designed the Professional MBA program as a part-time, 28-month MBA program for working professionals. Students have the options of taking classes in 20 locations throughout SC and one location in Charlotte, NC. Some classes are also broadcast over South Carolina's public television system, ETV. The professors that teach in the program are the same professors who teach full-time students.

===== Other programs =====
Master of Accountancy

The Master of Accountancy program is designed for students who have an undergraduate degree in accounting from an accredited university. It is open to anyone who satisfies the school's admission standards regardless of their undergraduate major.

Master of Arts in Economics

Graduate course offerings in economics include business economics, human capital and manpower economics, quantitative economics, public finance, money and banking, economic history, economic theory, developmental economics, international economics, and industrial organization and public policy.

Masters of Human Resources

The MHR Program consists of 36 hours of course work plus a required six-hour internship. All internships are professional level, last at least eight weeks (most last 12 or more) and provide on-the-job experience in an actual human resources environment. Limited enrollment (approximately 45 new students per year) and small class size provide students with individualized attention. Each year, more than 20 partner companies recruit in person on campus from the MHR program. Notably, this past year’s recruiters included: AbbVie Inc, Boeing, Chevron, Conagra, Eastman Chemical Company, Eaton Corporation, ExxonMobil, GE Aerospace, GE Vernova, Honeywell, IBM, Intel, International Paper, John Hancock/Manulife, Lear Corporation, Lennox/Allied Air Enterprises, Owens Corning, PepsiCo/Frito-Lay North America, Pentair, Prudential, Synchrony Financial, UPS. All MHR students complete full-time internships and achieve a 100% placement rate within 90 days of graduation, making it one of the top MHR programs in the United States.

Master of International Business

The Master of International Business Program is an interdisciplinary program that combines international business with international studies.

==== Doctoral ====
For those students who wish to enter academia, the Moore School offers two basic doctoral programs: PhD in Business Administration and Ph.D. in Economics. These programs have a large amount of flexibility to suit the needs of each students. Graduates currently hold positions at University of Memphis, Cambridge University, Indiana University, University of Houston–Clear Lake, College of Charleston, University of North Carolina at Charlotte, Furman University, East Carolina University, the Federal Reserve Bank of New York, the Environmental Protection Agency, the Central Intelligence Agency, the International Monetary Fund, BellSouth, and Bank of America.

== Student organizations ==
- Alpha Kappa Psi
- American Marketing Association
- Association of Supply Chain Students (ASCS)
- Beta Alpha Psi
- Beta Gamma Sigma
- Business Student Council
- Carolina Finance Club
- Carolina Model United Nations
- Delta Sigma Pi
- Finance Scholars
- Financial Management Association
- Gamma Iota Sigma
- Marketing Scholars
- Sigma Omega Upsilon- International Business Fraternity
- Society for Human Resource Management (SHRM)
- Global Business Council
- National Association of Black Accountants
- Carolina Investment Association
- Phi Chi Theta Business Professional Fraternity
- Women in Business Council

== See also ==
- List of United States business school rankings
- List of business schools in the United States
