= W. Gordon Belser Arboretum =

Arboretum in Columbia, South Carolina, United States

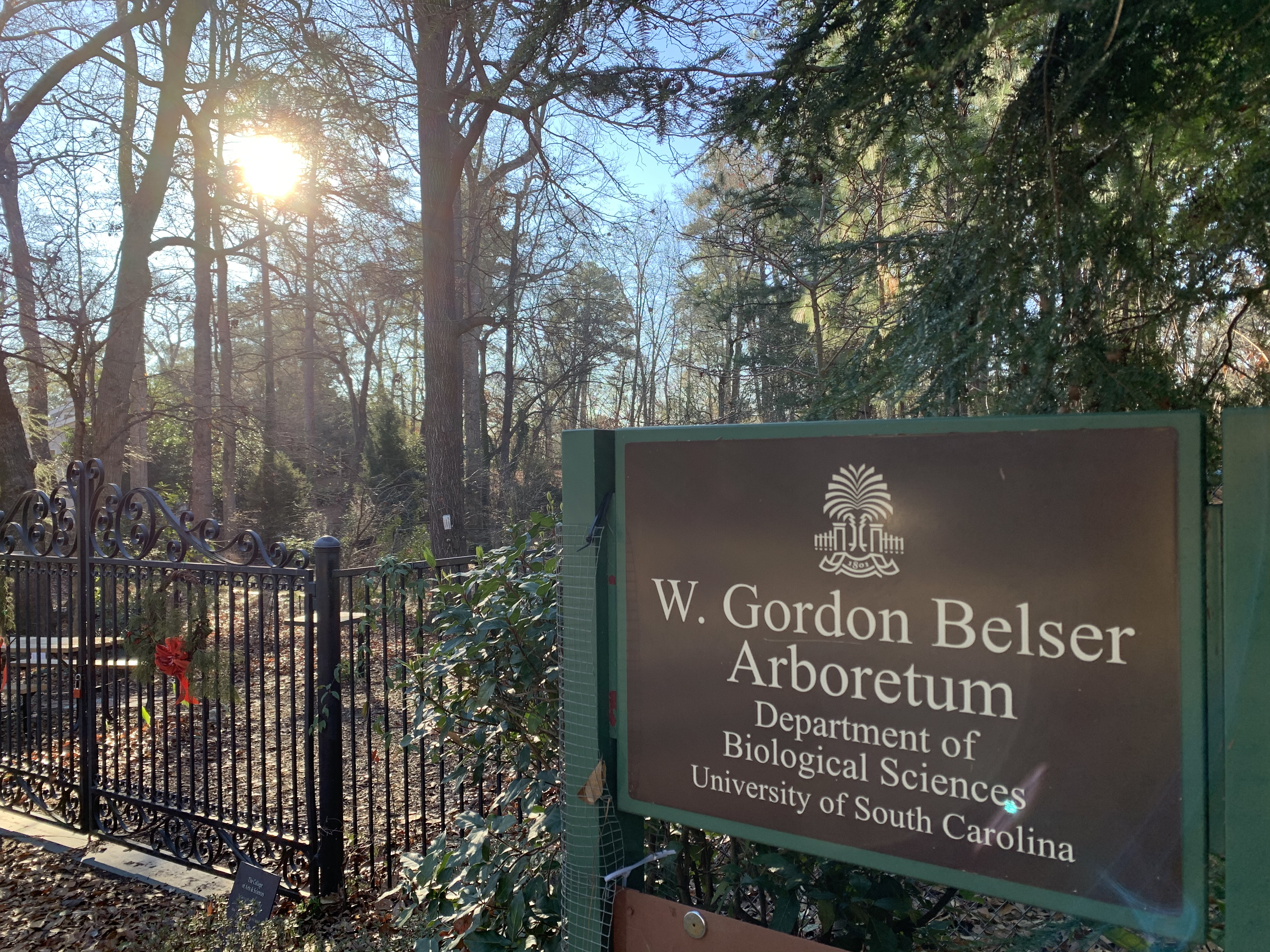
- Bloomwood road gate in winter
- Interactive map of W. Gordon Belser Arboretum
- Type: Arboretum
- Location: 4080 Bloomwood Rd. Columbia, SC 29205
- Coordinates: 33°59′39″N 80°59′04″W
- Area: 9 acres (3.6 ha)
- Created: 1959
- Operator: University of South Carolina
- Open: Open House the 3rd Sunday of every month, 1 - 4 p.m. Pets are not permitted. Parking available on Wilmot Dr.
- Paths: 0.35 miles (0.56 km) Lindler Circle Trail
- Habitats: Sandhills ridges, bottomland hardwood forest, wetland
- Species: Over 100 tree species
- Collections: Blight-resistant American chestnut, Atlantic white cypress, Southeast native Magnolia and Rhododendron
- Website: sc.edu/study/colleges_schools/artsandsciences/biological_sciences/research/resources_facilities/arboretum/index.php

W. Gordon Belser Arboretum is part of the University of South Carolina in Columbia, South Carolina, managed by the Department of Biological Sciences. The arboretum serves as a nature preserve, field laboratory and research site for students and faculty. It is open to the public at a monthly open house. A small botanic garden features shrubs and small trees suitable for Columbia's home landscapes. The remaining landscape features southeast native trees and plant communities and is a certified Palmetto Wildlife Habitat.

The Lindler Circle Trail is approximately 0.35 mi (0.56 km), and several short spur paths lead to the bald cypress swamp and dam, the central wetland, and an overlook.

Topography within the approximately 9-acre (3.6 ha) arboretum changes dramatically. Dry sandy ridges slope into a ravine with bottomland hardwood forest and wetlands. Springs feed a bog and small creek. City storm drains replace natural drainage channels, and feed the arboretum's bald cypress swamp. Stormwater spreads out here, and water that does not infiltrate flows over a dam spillway, through the creek and over a waterfall into the stormwater system, eventually feeding Gills Creek.

In 1959, William Gordon Belser gave the land to the university and stipulated its mission. But over decades the property became choked with invasive species and was unusable. A major restoration occurred from 2006 - 2016, led by USC professor Dr. Patricia DeCoursey, who marshaled thousands of university and community volunteers to perform the work. DeCoursey was recognized for her vision and effort to transform the arboretum in 2012, when she received South Carolina's Environmental Awareness Award. She stepped down in 2018, and Dr. Trey Franklin became director.

== Arboretum native plant communities ==
- Longleaf pine (Pinus palustris) and eastern wiregrass prairie
- Blight-resistant American chestnut (Castanea dentata)
- Upland oak-hickory deciduous forest
- Bottomland hardwood deciduous forest dominated by tulip tree, Liriodendron tulipifera
- American beech (Fagus grandifolia) and maple (Acer rubrum, A. leucoderme) forest
- Bald cypress swamp (Taxodium distichum)
- Atlantic white cypress bog (Chamaecyparis thyoides)
- Southeast native Magnolia and Rhododendrons
- Streetside display gardens of native and non-native azaleas and small flowering trees
- Riparian and wetland communities
- Trailside wildflower gardens

== Public Visiting Information ==
Visitors are invited to the free Open House the 3rd Sunday of every month from 1 - 4 p.m. In spring and fall semesters, professors from the University of South Carolina, naturalists, or other experts present at the Open House.

Gates are open on Bloomwood and Wilmot Dr. Parking is available on both streets. The mulched path is uneven and the terrain is hilly. Pets are not permitted in the arboretum.

== Gallery ==
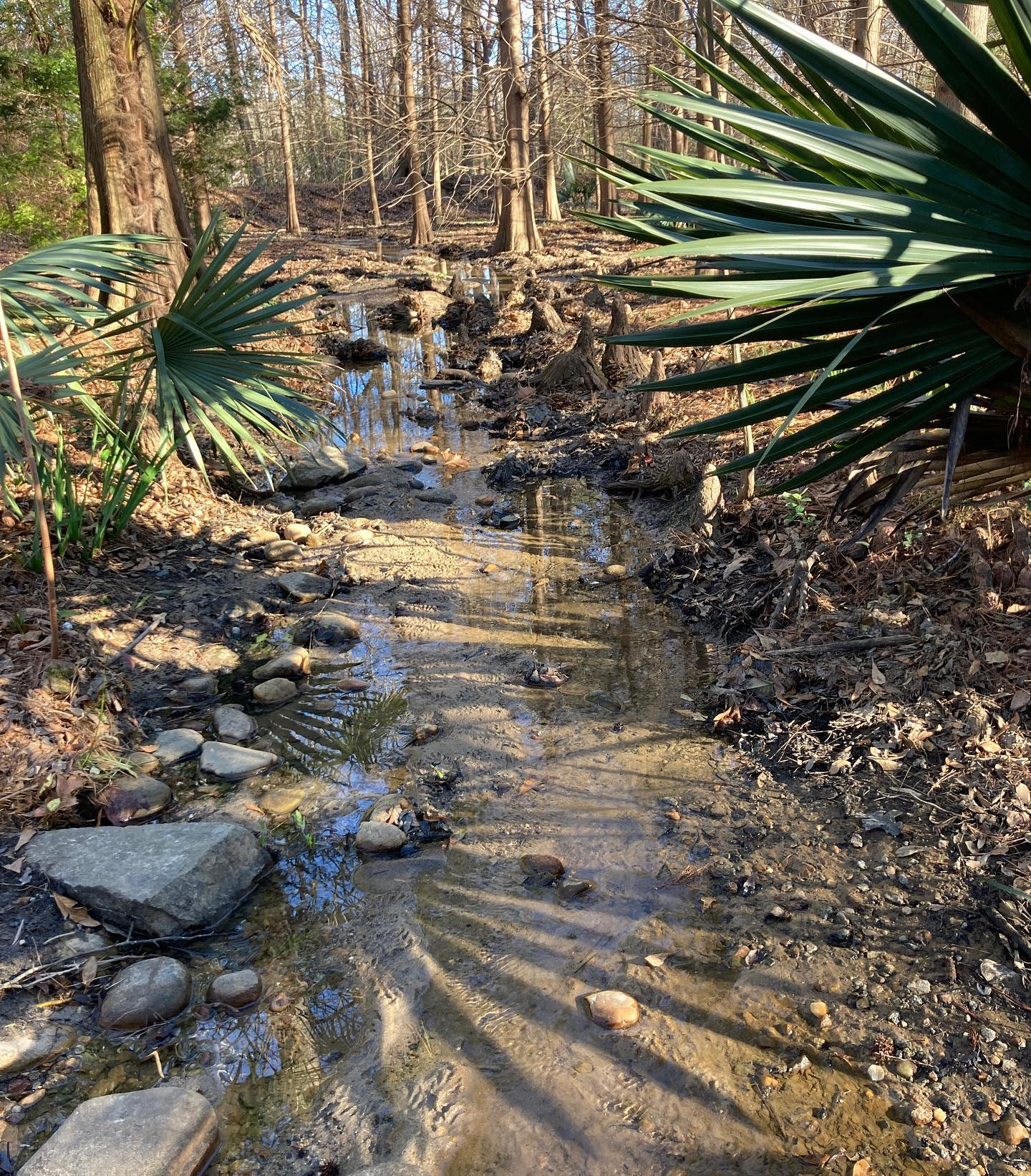
View into the bald cypress swamp in winter from the boardwalk over the creek.

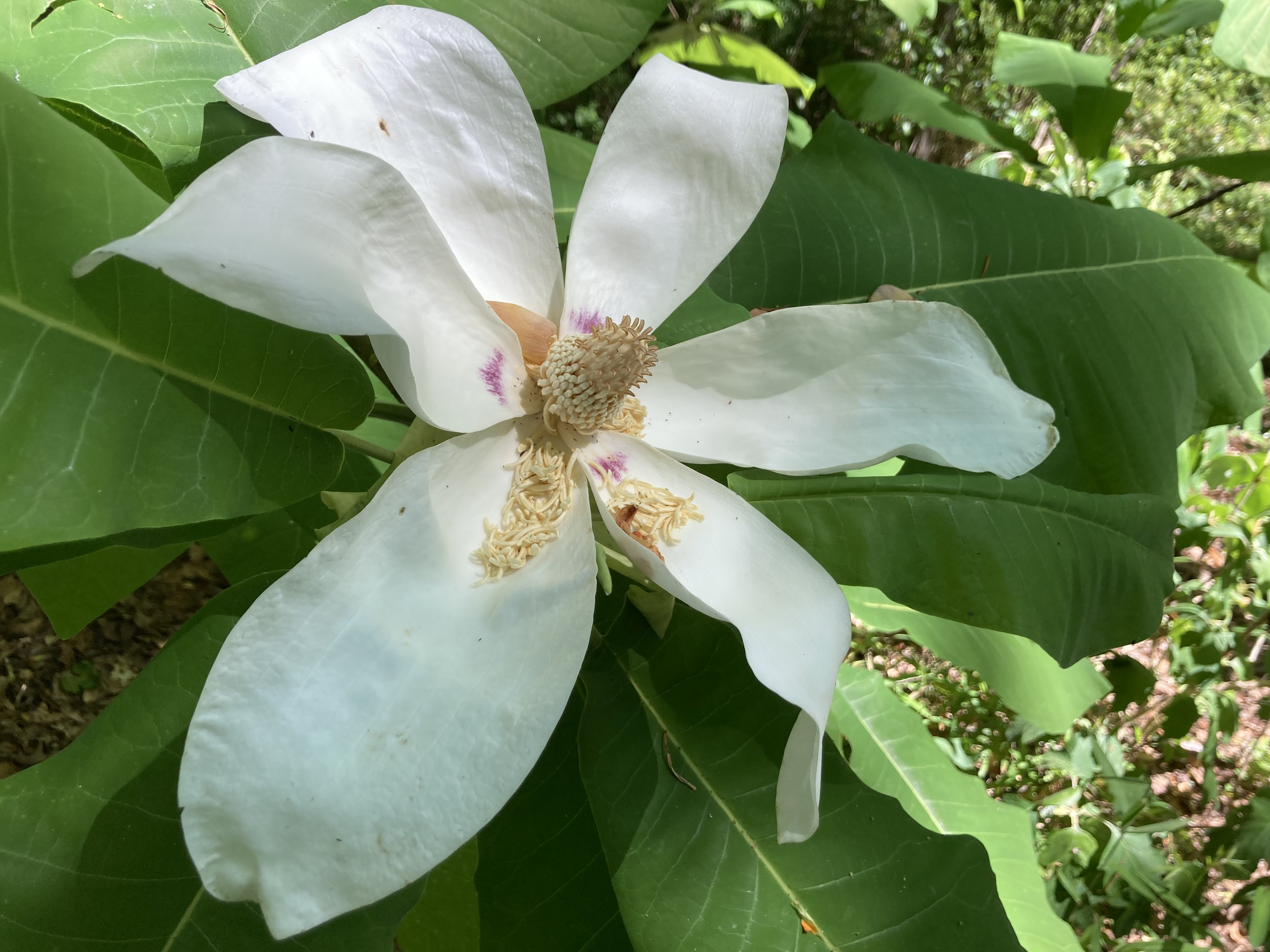
Magnolia.

== See also ==
- "USC's arboretum 'absolutely stunning'"
- Sherwood Forest Neighborhood
- Gills Creek Watershed Association
- List of botanical gardens and arboretums in South Carolina
