= Belzer =

Belzer (/ˈbɛlzər/ or /ˈbɛltsər/), or Beltzer /ˈbɛltsər/, is a Yiddish surname. It derives from the adjectival form of Belz (Yiddish: בעלזא, Galicia) or Bălți (Bessarabia), both shtetlekh. It can mean adjective form, or a member of the Belzer Hasidim.

== People with the surname ==
- Bill Belzer
- Chazzan Nissi Belzer (Nisn Spivak)
- Francis O. Belzer
- Richard Belzer, comedian and actor
- Seth Belzer

== See also ==
- Belser
