= List of county courthouses in Minnesota =

This is a list of county courthouses in the U.S. state of Minnesota. Each county in Minnesota has a city that is the county seat where the county government resides, including a county courthouse.

Federal courthouses in Minnesota are listed here.

| Courthouse name | Image | County | Location | Built | Notes |
|---|---|---|---|---|---|
| Aitkin County Courthouse | | Aitkin | Aitkin; 46°31′58.5″N 93°42′36.5″W | 1929 | Beaux-Arts and Moderne. NRHP-listed. |
| Anoka County Courthouse | | Anoka | Anoka; 45°11′54″N 93°23′11″W | | |
| Becker County Courthouse | | Becker | Detroit Lakes; 46°49′0″N 95°50′47″W | 1942 | |
| Beltrami County Courthouse | | Beltrami | Bemidji; 47°28′27″N 94°52′55″W | 1902–3 | Beaux-Arts. NRHP-listed. |
| Benton County Courthouse | | Benton | Foley; 45°40′8″N 93°54′34″W | 1998 | |
| Big Stone County Courthouse | | Big Stone | Ortonville; 45°18′17″N 96°26′40″W | 1902 | NRHP-listed. |
| Blue Earth County Courthouse | | Blue Earth | Mankato; 44°9′49″N 93°59′57″W | 1886–9 | NRHP-listed. |
| Brown County Courthouse | | Brown | New Ulm; 44°18′40″N 94°27′43″W | 1891, 1918 | Renaissance Revival |
| Carlton County Courthouse | | Carlton | Carlton; 46°39′54″N 92°25′28″W | 1922 | Renaissance Revival. NRHP-listed. |
| Carver County Justice Center | | Carver | Chaska; 44°47′20″N 93°35′36″W | 1963–66 | Built in Corporate International style to replace Carver County's first courthouse, completed in 1872. |
| Cass County Courthouse | | Cass | Walker; 47°6′4.5″N 94°34′47″W | 1902–07, 1961, 1976 | Built 1902–07 in Italian Renaissance Revival style. The original dome and cornice were removed in 1961 to add an additional story. |
| Chippewa County Courthouse | | Chippewa | Montevideo; 44°57′4.5″N 95°42′51″W | 1957 | Built in Corporate International style to replace Chippewa County's first courthouse, built in 1883 and enlarged in 1901. |
| Chisago County Government Center | | Chisago | Center City; 45°23′57″N 92°49′20″W | | |
| Old Chisago County Courthouse | | Chisago | Almelund; 45°27′50″N 92°44′33″W | 1876 | Moved to the Almelund Threshing Show Grounds in 1990 to make way for construction of Chisago County's new government center. Formerly NRHP-listed. |
| Clay County Courthouse | | Clay | Moorhead; 46°53′3″N 96°45′50″W | 1954 | Replaced an 1883 courthouse, which had in turn replaced Clay County's first courthouse, built in 1879. |
| Clearwater County Courthouse | | Clearwater | Bagley; 47°31′28″N 95°23′57″W | 1938 | Constructed by the Public Works Administration to replace Clearwater County's original 1903 courthouse. |
| Cook County Courthouse | | Cook | Grand Marais; 47°45′8.5″N 90°20′21.5″W | 1911 | Neoclassical. NRHP-listed. |
| Cottonwood County Courthouse | | Cottonwood | Windom; 43°51′57.5″N 95°7′1″W | 1904 | Neoclassical. NRHP-listed. |
| Crow Wing County Courthouse | | Crow Wing | Brainerd; 46°21′19.5″N 94°12′13.5″W | 1920 | Beaux-Arts. NRHP-listed. |
| Dakota County Judicial Center | | Dakota | Hastings; 44°44′25″N 92°53′10″W | 1974 | |
| Dakota County Northern Service Center | | Dakota | West St. Paul; 44°53′4″N 93°5′12″W | | |
| Dakota County Western Service Center | | Dakota | Apple Valley; 44°43′59″N 93°12′35″W | | |
| Old Dakota County Courthouse | | Dakota | Hastings; 44°44′33.5″N 92°51′6.5″W | 1869–71 | Italianate and Romanesque Revival. Vacated in 1974 and repurposed as Hastings City Hall in 1993. NRHP-listed. |
| Dodge County Courthouse | | Dodge | Mantorville; 44°4′6″N 92°45′18″W | 1871 | Greek Revival and Italianate. Minnesota's oldest active courthouse. A contributing property to the NRHP-listed Mantorville Historic District. |
| Douglas County Courthouse | | Douglas | Alexandria; 45°53′3″N 95°22′54″W | 1895 | Romanesque. NRHP-listed. |
| Faribault County Courthouse | | Faribault | Blue Earth; 43°38′32.5″N 94°6′11″W | 1891 | Richardsonian Romanesque. NRHP-listed. |
| Fillmore County Courthouse | | Fillmore | Preston; 43°40′11″N 92°4′57.5″W | 1958, 2004 | |
| Freeborn County Courthouse | | Freeborn | Albert Lea; 43°38′46″N 93°22′5″W | 1888, 1955, 1975 | Richardsonian Romanesque |
| Goodhue County Justice Center | | Goodhue | Red Wing; 44°33′45″N 92°31′59″W | | |
| Old Goodhue County Courthouse | | Goodhue | Red Wing; 44°33′42.5″N 92°32′2.5″W | 1932 | Built in Moderne style, replacing Goodhue County's original 1859 courthouse. Now the Goodhue County Government Center. |
| Grant County Courthouse | | Grant | Elbow Lake; 45°59′41.5″N 95°58′36.5″W | 1905 | Beaux-Arts and Renaissance Revival. NRHP-listed. |
| Hennepin County Courthouse and Minneapolis City Hall | | Hennepin | Minneapolis; 44°58′38″N 93°15′55″W | 1888–1909 | Richardsonian Romanesque. NRHP-listed. |
| Hennepin County District Court–Brookdale | | Hennepin | Brooklyn Center; 45°3′58″N 93°18′41″W | 1981 | Co-located with Brookdale Library. |
| Hennepin County District Court–Ridgedale | | Hennepin | Minnetonka; 44°57′52″N 93°26′25″W | 1982 | Co-located with Ridgedale Library. |
| Hennepin County District Court–Southdale | | Hennepin | Edina; 44°52′32″N 93°19′11″W | 1973 | Co-located with Southdale Library. Closed in 2019 prior to construction of a new facility. |
| Hennepin County Government Center | | Hennepin | Minneapolis; 44°58′33″N 93°16′0″W | 1969–77 | |
| Hennepin County Family Justice Center | | Hennepin | Minneapolis; 44°58′45.5″N 93°16′4″W | | Houses Hennepin County's family court. |
| Hennepin County Juvenile Justice Center | | Hennepin | Minneapolis; 44°58′28″N 93°15′43″W | | Houses Hennepin County's juvenile court. |
| Houston County Courthouse | | Houston | Caledonia; 43°37′57.5″N 91°29′46″W | 1883 | Romanesque Revival. NRHP-listed. |
| Hubbard County Courthouse | | Hubbard | Park Rapids; 46°55′12″N 95°3′49.5″W | 1900 | Neoclassical. Original wing now houses a history museum and art center. NRHP-listed. |
| Isanti County Government Center | | Isanti | Cambridge; 45°33′22″N 93°13′47″W | | |
| Old Isanti County Courthouse | | Isanti | Cambridge; 45°34′17″N 93°13′35″W | 1888 | Built to replace Isanti County's original 1871 courthouse, in a mix of Second Empire and Italianate style. Now an office building. NRHP-listed. |
| Itasca County Courthouse | | Itasca | Grand Rapids; 47°14′11″N 93°31′34″W | 1951, 1969, 1978 | Built to replace an 1894 courthouse, which had supplanted a short-lived building constructed in 1891. |
| Jackson County Courthouse | | Jackson | Jackson; 43°37′16.5″N 94°59′24.5″W | 1909 | Beaux-Arts. NRHP-listed. |
| Kanabec County Courthouse | | Kanabec | Mora; 45°52′38.5″N 93°17′36″W | 1894 | Romanesque Revival. NRHP-listed. |
| Kiel & Morgan Hotel | | Lyon | Lynd; 44°23′36″N 95°53′30.5″W | 1871 | First site where government business was regularly conducted during the early Euro-American settlement of Lyon County. NRHP-listed. |
| Koochiching County Courthouse | | Koochiching | International Falls; 48°36′4.5″N 93°24′38″W | 1909 | Neoclassical. NRHP-listed. |
| Lac qui Parle County Courthouse | | Lac qui Parle | Madison; 45°0′54″N 96°11′35.5″W | 1899 | Richardsonian Romanesque. NRHP-listed. |
| Lake County Courthouse | | Lake | Two Harbors; 47°1′19.5″N 91°40′17″W | 1906 | Beaux-Arts. NRHP-listed. |
| Le Sueur County Courthouse and Jail | | Le Sueur | Le Center; 44°23′19″N 93°43′56″W | 1896 | Romanesque Revival. NRHP-listed. |
| Lincoln County Courthouse | | Lincoln | Ivanhoe; 44°27′46″N 96°15′8″W | 1919 | Neoclassical and Beaux-Arts. NRHP-listed. |
| Mahnomen County Courthouse | | Mahnomen | Mahnomen; 47°19′4″N 95°58′10″W | 1909 | Neoclassical. NRHP-listed. |
| Martin County Courthouse | | Martin | Fairmont; 43°39′10.5″N 94°27′54″W | 1907 | Beaux-Arts. NRHP-listed. |
| McLeod County Courthouse | | McLeod | Glencoe; 44°46′11″N 94°9′3″W | 1909–12 | Beaux-Arts. NRHP-listed. |
| Mille Lacs County Courthouse | | Mille Lacs | Milaca; 45°45′15.5″N 93°38′35″W | 1923 | Renaissance Revival. NRHP-listed. |
| Morrison County Courthouse | | Morrison | Little Falls; 45°58′32″N 94°21′38″W | 1890–1 | Richardsonian Romanesque. NRHP-listed. |
| Mower County Justice Center | | Mower | Austin; 43°40′8″N 92°58′23″W | | |
| Murray County Courthouse | | Murray | Slayton; 43°59′4″N 95°45′23″W | 1974, 1981 | Replaced an 1892 Romanesque Revival building, NRHP-listed until it was demolished in 1981. |
| Nicollet County Government Center | | Nicollet | St. Peter; 44°19′18″N 93°57′30″W | 1880–1, 1978 | Romanesque Revival. NRHP-listed. |
| Nobles County Justice Center | | Nobles | Worthington; 43°38′53″N 95°35′24″W | 2002 | |
| Norman County Courthouse | | Norman | Ada; 47°17′54″N 96°30′48″W | 1904 | Romanesque Revival. NRHP-listed. |
| Olmsted County Government Center | | Olmsted | Rochester; 44°1′11″N 92°27′38″W | 1958, 1976–1977 | Built in Corporate International style to replace an 1867 building similar to and by the same designer as the Washington County Courthouse. |
| Otter Tail County Courthouse | | Otter Tail | Fergus Falls; 46°16′48″N 96°4′30″W | 1922, 1962 | Beaux-Arts. NRHP-listed. |
| Pine County Courthouse | | Pine | Pine City; 45°51′10″N 92°58′18″W | 2007 | |
| Pipestone County Courthouse | | Pipestone | Pipestone; 43°59′50″N 96°19′6″W | 1901 | Beaux-Arts. NRHP-listed. |
| Polk County Government Center | | Polk | Crookston; 47°46′43.3″N 96°36′09″W | 1968 | Modern |
| Pope County Courthouse | | Pope | Glenwood; 45°38′59.5″N 95°23′16″W | 1930 | Beaux-Arts. NRHP-listed. |
| Ramsey County Courthouse and Saint Paul City Hall | | Ramsey | St. Paul; 44°56′39″N 93°5′38″W | 1932 | Art Deco. NRHP-listed. |
| Red Lake County Courthouse | | Red Lake | Red Lake Falls; 47°53′5.5″N 96°16′27.5″W | 1911 | Beaux-Arts. NRHP-listed. |
| Renville County Courthouse | | Renville | Olivia; 44°46′34″N 94°59′0″W | 1902 | NRHP-listed. |
| Rice County Courthouse | | Rice | Faribault; 44°17′38.5″N 93°16′20″W | 1934 | Art Deco. NRHP-listed. |
| Rock County Courthouse | | Rock | Luverne; 43°39′24.5″N 96°12′26″W | 1887 | Richardsonian Romanesque. NRHP-listed. |
| Roseau County Courthouse | | Roseau | Roseau; 48°50′22″N 95°46′1″W | 1996 | |
| Old Roseau County Courthouse | | Roseau | Roseau; 48°50′45.5″N 95°45′56″W | 1913 | Renaissance Revival. Now a commercial building. NRHP-listed. |
| St. Louis County Courthouse | | St. Louis | Duluth; 46°47′1″N 92°6′24″W | 1908–9 | Contributing property to the NRHP-listed Duluth Civic Center Historic District. |
| St. Louis County District Courthouse | | St. Louis | Virginia; 47°31′15″N 92°32′16″W | 1910, 1921 | Beaux-Arts. NRHP-listed. |
| Scott County Justice Center | | Scott | Shakopee; 44°47′41″N 93°31′40″W | 1998 | Modern |
| Sibley County Courthouse | | Sibley | Gaylord; 44°33′22″N 94°13′14″W | 1916 | Neoclassical. NRHP-listed. |
| Old Sibley County Courthouse | | Sibley | Henderson; 44°31′42″N 93°54′33″W | 1879 | Italianate. Vacated in 1915, now Henderson City Hall and the Joseph R. Brown River Heritage Center. NRHP-listed. |
| Stearns County Courthouse | | Stearns | St. Cloud; 45°33′38″N 94°9′45″W | 1921 | Beaux-Arts. NRHP-listed. |
| Steele County Courthouse | | Steele | Owatonna; 44°4′59.5″N 93°13′31.5″W | 1891 | Romanesque Revival and Italianate. NRHP-listed. |
| Swift County Courthouse | | Swift | Benson; 45°19′1.5″N 95°36′4″W | 1897–8 | Richardsonian Romanesque. NRHP-listed. |
| Todd County Courthouse | | Todd | Long Prairie; 45°58′21″N 94°51′40″W | 1883, 1965, 1980 | Italianate. NRHP-listed. |
| Waseca County Courthouse | | Waseca | Waseca; 44°4′47″N 93°30′28″W | 1897 | Richardsonian Romanesque. NRHP-listed. |
| Washington County Courthouse | | Washington | Stillwater; 45°2′17″N 92°48′14″W | | |
| Old Washington County Courthouse | | Washington | Stillwater; 45°3′6″N 92°48′27″W | 1867–70 | Italianate. Vacated in 1975. NRHP-listed. |
| Watonwan County Courthouse | | Watonwan | St. James; 43°58′52.5″N 94°37′32.5″W | 1895–6 | Romanesque Revival. NRHP-listed. |
| Wilkin County Courthouse | | Wilkin | Breckenridge; 46°15′37.5″N 96°35′14″W | 1928–9 | Beaux-Arts and Moderne. NRHP-listed. |
| Winona County Courthouse | | Winona | Winona; 44°3′10.5″N 91°38′25.5″W | 1889 | Richardsonian Romanesque. NRHP-listed. |

== See also ==
- List of courthouses in the United States
- List of United States federal courthouses in Minnesota
