= National Register of Historic Places listings in Isanti County, Minnesota =

Location of Isanti County in Minnesota

This is a list of the National Register of Historic Places listings in Isanti County, Minnesota. It is intended to be a complete list of the properties and districts on the National Register of Historic Places in Isanti County, Minnesota, United States. The locations of National Register properties and districts for which the latitude and longitude coordinates are included below, may be seen in an online map.

There are 8 properties and districts listed on the National Register in the county. A supplementary list includes one additional site that was formerly on the National Register.

This National Park Service list is complete through NPS recent listings posted April 24, 2026.

== Current listings ==
	Name on the Register	Image	Date listed	Location	City or town	Description
1	District No. 1 School	District No. 1 School	July 24, 1980 (#80002078)	Off County Highway 7; 45°31′18″N 93°26′38″W	Spencer Brook	1874 one-room schoolhouse, a rare surviving structure from one of the county's earliest settlements, founded in the late 1850s by native-born New Englanders.
2	Edward Erickson Farmstead	Edward Erickson Farmstead	July 24, 1980 (#80002071)	County Highway 56 and Minnesota Highway 65; 45°26′32″N 93°14′18″W	Isanti vicinity	Well-preserved potato farm with second-generation buildings mostly constructed 1915–1930; the legacy of a prosperous local farmer and an important cash crop in early-20th-century Isanti County.
3	Isanti County Courthouse	Isanti County Courthouse	July 24, 1980 (#80002074)	237 2nd Ave., SW. 45°34′17″N 93°13′35″W	Cambridge	1887 courthouse, nominated for being one of Minnesota's oldest courthouses still in use and the long-serving home of the county government. Now a commercial office building.
4	Linden Barn	Linden Barn	July 24, 1980 (#80002075)	County Highway 19; 45°31′16″N 93°10′36″W	Isanti Township	Prominent 1914 round barn and adjacent silo, emblematic of the Swedish immigrants and agricultural developments that characterize much of Isanti County's history.
5	Oscar Olson House	Oscar Olson House	July 24, 1980 (#80002073)	309 Beechwood; 45°43′36″N 93°10′05″W	Braham	Large Colonial Revival house built in 1914, noted for its long occupancy by a local banker and civic leader (d. 1973) and its distinctiveness among Isanti County's housing stock.
6	St. John's Lutheran Church	St. John's Lutheran Church	July 24, 1980 (#80002072)	County Highway 5; 45°30′01″N 93°17′20″W	Isanti vicinity	Well-preserved example of Isanti County's small, rural churches—built in 1882—and a symbol of its early German immigrants.
7	Svenska Mission Kyrka I Sodre Maple Ridge	Svenska Mission Kyrka I Sodre Maple Ridge	July 24, 1980 (#80002077)	County Highway 1; 45°39′58″N 93°19′40″W	Maple Ridge Township	1897 Swedish Mission church, a well-preserved example of the small, non-Lutheran churches established by Isanti County's Reformed Swedish settlers.
8	West Riverside School	West Riverside School	July 24, 1980 (#80002076)	County Highway 14; 45°35′00″N 93°14′44″W	Cambridge vicinity	Brick one-room schoolhouse built in 1898, a particularly fine example of the usual venues for education in rural Isanti County in the late 19th and early 20th centuries.

== Former listings ==
	Name on the Register	Image	Date listed	Date removed	Location	City or town	Description
1	Farmers Cooperative Mercantile Company of West Stanford		July 24, 1980 (#80002079)	May 23, 2016	County Highway 7; 45°26′40″N 93°27′34″W	Crown	1924 cooperative store operated by local farmers. Burned down in 2008.

== See also ==
- List of National Historic Landmarks in Minnesota
- National Register of Historic Places listings in Minnesota
