= Maple Ridge Township, Minnesota =

Maple Ridge Township is the name of some places in the U.S. state of Minnesota:

- Maple Ridge Township, Beltrami County, Minnesota
- Maple Ridge Township, Isanti County, Minnesota
