= Sibley County Courthouse and Sheriff's Residence and Jail =

Government buildings in Minnesota, United States

- U.S. National Register of Historic Places
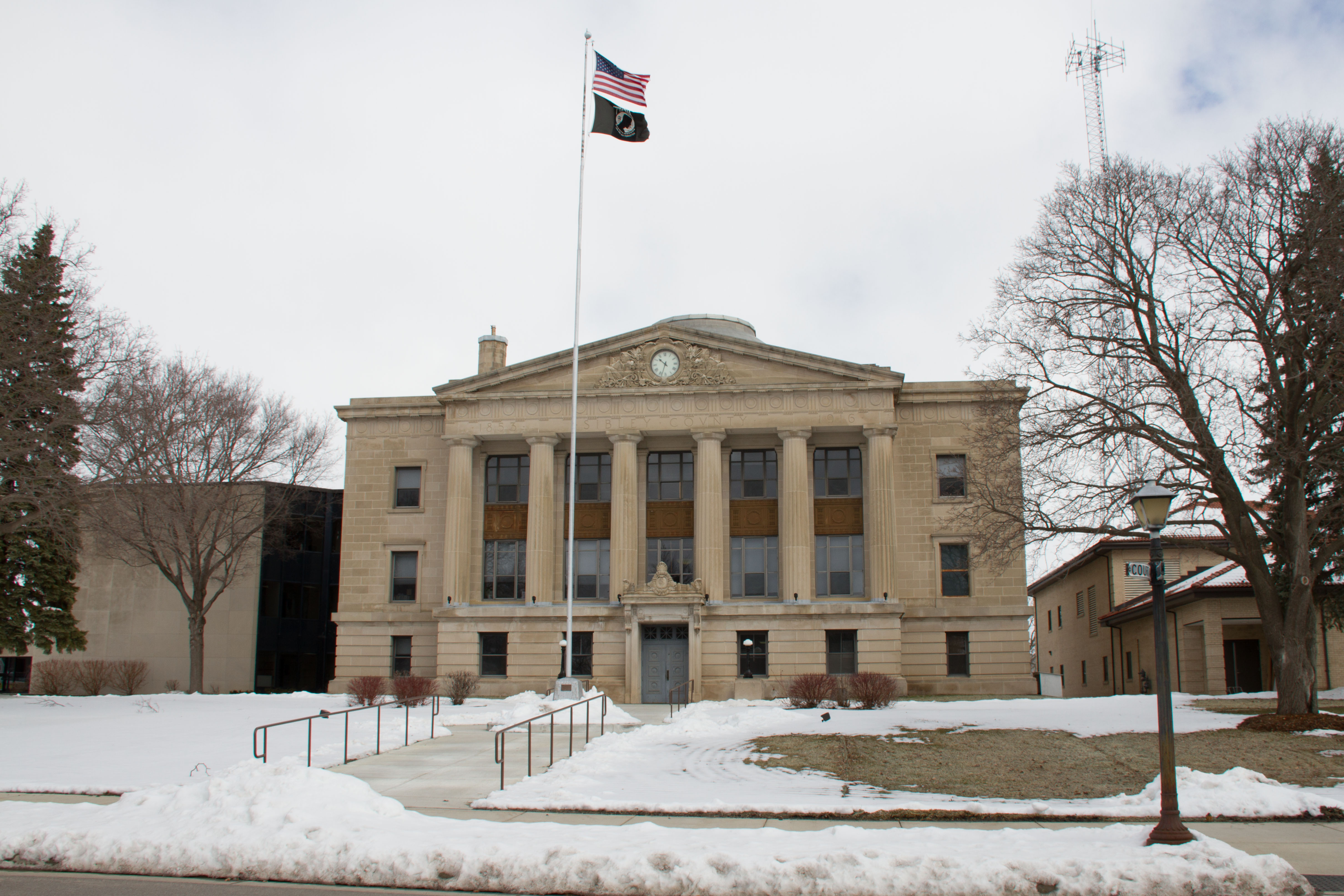
- The Sibley County Courthouse from the south, with the County Jail on right

- Location within Minnesota Location within the United States
- Interactive map showing the location for Sibley County Courthouse and Sheriff's Residence and Jail
- Location: 400 Court Street and 319 Park Avenue, Gaylord, Minnesota
- Coordinates: 44°33′22″N 94°13′14″W
- Area: Less than one acre
- Built: 1916
- Built by: Olson and Johnson
- Architect: James A. Burner and William K. Macomber
- Architectural style: Neoclassical (courthouse) and Spanish Colonial Revival (residence/jail)
- NRHP reference No.: 88003071
- Added to NRHP: December 29, 1988

The Sibley County Courthouse and Sheriff's Residence and Jail are two adjacent government buildings in Gaylord, Minnesota, United States. They were built in 1916 and serve as the seat of government for Sibley County. An annex to the courthouse was added in 1976.

== History ==
Sibley County's seat of government was originally in Henderson, on the eastern edge of the county along the transportation artery of the Minnesota River. After occupying a variety of commercial buildings, the first permanent Sibley County Courthouse was erected there in 1879. The more centrally located town of Gaylord was founded in the early 1880s along the Minneapolis and St. Louis Railway, the first rail line laid through Sibley County. As a transportation hub for the surrounding farmland, Gaylord boomed. For 25 years residents of Gaylord and western Sibley County campaigned to have the county seat moved, but failed three times when put to the popular vote until a decisive victory in 1915. The decision catalyzed a flurry of additional building in Gaylord, most prominently the new government complex.

The Sibley County Courthouse and Jail were listed together on the National Register of Historic Places in 1988 for their state-level significance in the themes of architecture and politics/government. They were nominated for their fine architecture and for being prominent symbols of Gaylord's sustained growth from its founding in the 1880s through the early 20th century, for which it gained county seat status.

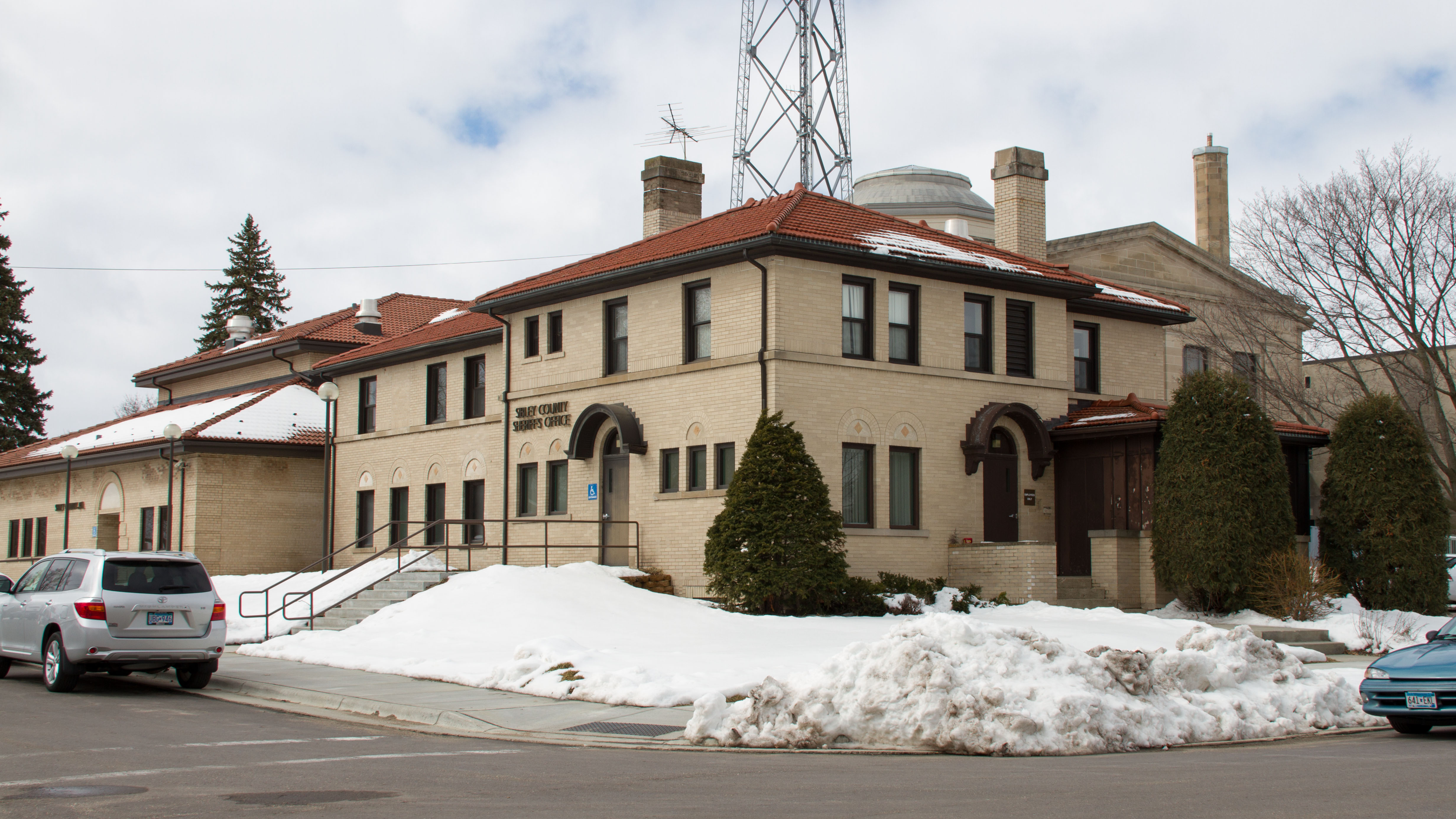
The Sibley County Sheriff's Office and Jail viewed from the northeast

== See also ==
- List of county courthouses in Minnesota
- National Register of Historic Places listings in Sibley County, Minnesota
