= List of United States federal courthouses in Minnesota =

Following is a list of current and former courthouses of the United States federal court system located in Minnesota. Each entry indicates the name of the building along with an image, if available, its location and the jurisdiction it covers, the dates during which it was used for each such jurisdiction, and, if applicable the person for whom it was named, and the date of renaming. Dates of use will not necessarily correspond with the dates of construction or demolition of a building, as pre-existing structures may be adapted or court use, and former court buildings may later be put to other uses. Also, the official name of the building may be changed at some point after its use as a federal court building has been initiated.

== Courthouses ==
Courthouse	City	Image	Street address	Jurisdiction	Dates of use	Named for
U.S. Court House, Custom House, & Post Office	Duluth		?	D. Minn	1894–c.1929 Razed in 1929 or 1930.	n/a
Gerald W. Heaney Federal Building, U.S. Courthouse & Custom House^{†}	Duluth		515 West First Street	D. Minn	1930–present	Court of Appeals judge Gerald Heaney (2007)
Edward J. Devitt U.S. Courthouse and Federal Building†	Fergus Falls		118 South Mill Street	D. Minn.	1904–present	Edward Devitt
Federal Courthouse and Post Office^{†}	Mankato		South Second and East Jackson Streets	D. Minn	1896–?	n/a
Federal Office Building & Custom House	Minneapolis		3rd Street & Marquette Avenue	D. Minn	1890–c.1961 Razed in 1961.	n/a
U.S. Court House & Federal Office Building	Minneapolis		100–116 South 4th Street	D. Minn	Construction completed 1960. Now Hennepin County Family Justice Center.	n/a
Diana E. Murphy U.S. Courthouse	Minneapolis		300 South Fourth Street	D. Minn	1997–present	Diana E. Murphy
Federal Court House & Post Office^{†}	Moorhead		521 Main Avenue	D. Minn	1915–? Now the Rourke Art Museum.	n/a
U.S. Post Office, Court House, & Custom House^{†}	Saint Paul		75 West Fifth Street	D. Minn	1902–1960; Now the Landmark Center, a cultural center containing museums.	n/a
Warren E. Burger Federal Building & U.S. Courthouse	Saint Paul		316 Robert Street North	D. Minn	1966–present	Chief Justice Warren E. Burger
U.S. Courthouse & Post Office	Winona		4th and Main Streets	D. Minn.	1891–1963; Demolished.	n/a

== Key ==
^{†}	Listed on the National Register of Historic Places (NRHP)
^{††}	NRHP-listed and also designated as a National Historic Landmark
