= St. Louis County District Courthouse =

- U.S. National Register of Historic Places
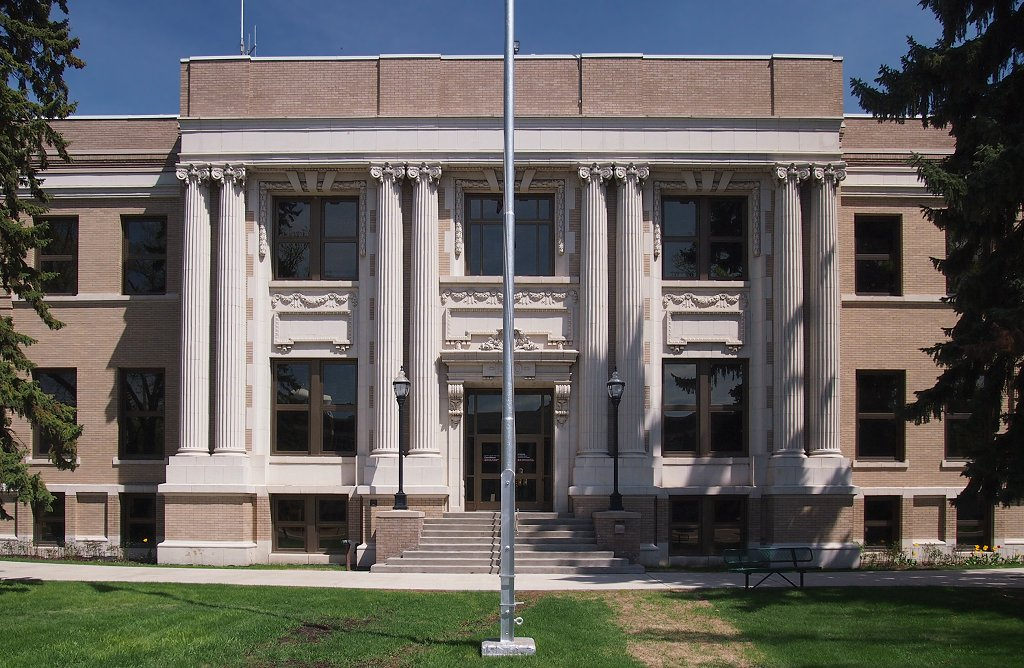
- The St. Louis County District Courthouse from the west

- Location within Minnesota Location within the United States
- Interactive map showing the location of St. Louis County District Courthouse
- Location: 300 S. 5th Avenue, Virginia, Minnesota
- Coordinates: 47°31′15″N 92°32′16″W
- Area: Less than one acre
- Built: 1910, 1921
- Architect: Bray & Nystrom (1910), Croft & Boerner (1921)
- Architectural style: Beaux-Arts
- NRHP reference No.: 92000798
- Added to NRHP: June 18, 1992

The St. Louis County District Courthouse is the seat of government for the northern district of St. Louis County, Minnesota, United States, located in the city of Virginia. The St. Louis County District Court is held in three locations: Duluth, Hibbing and Virginia.

The Virginia courthouse was built in Beaux-Arts style in 1910 and expanded with an architecturally sympathetic addition by the firm of Croft & Boerner in 1921. St. Louis County is large—some 6,860 square miles (17,800 km^{2})—and Duluth, the county seat, is at the southern end of the county, far removed from the communities of the Iron Range. Local advocacy succeeded in having a second county court district established in 1904, with cases heard in a small frame building. It was replaced by this present courthouse in 1910.

The St. Louis County District Courthouse was listed on the National Register of Historic Places in 1992 for its local significance in the themes of architecture and politics/government. It was nominated for being the long-serving center of government on the Iron Range, a symbol of the drive for local self-governance in Minnesota and one of Virginia's best examples of Beaux-Arts architecture.

== See also ==
- List of county courthouses in Minnesota
- National Register of Historic Places listings in St. Louis County, Minnesota
