= Washington County Courthouse (Minnesota) =

Historic place in Minnesota, United States

- U.S. National Register of Historic Places
- Washington County Courthouse from the north-northwest

- Location within Minnesota Location within the United States
- Interactive map showing the location of Washington County Courthouse
- Location: 101 West Pine Street, Stillwater, Minnesota
- Coordinates: 45°3′6″N 92°48′27″W
- Area: Less than one acre
- Built: 1867–1870
- Architect: Augustus F. Knight
- Architectural style: Italianate
- MPS: Washington County MRA (AD)
- NRHP reference No.: 71000443
- Added to NRHP: August 26, 1971

Washington County Courthouse, built in 1870 in Stillwater, Minnesota, United States, is one of the oldest standing courthouses in the state. It served as the center of Washington County government for more than a century, from the building's completion in 1870 until 1975. It was listed on the National Register of Historic Places in 1971 for its state-level significance in the themes of architecture and government/politics. It was nominated for its status as Minnesota's oldest functioning courthouse and one of its few surviving examples of monumental public architecture from the mid-19th century.

Since construction of a new government center in 1975, the historic courthouse has been restored and adapted for use as a venue for public community and cultural events, and private occasions.

== History ==
The west side of the building in 2018

The courthouse was designed by Augustus Knight of St. Paul, in the Italianate style. When the courthouse opened in 1870, the county was booming economically due to the lumber industry. The courthouse reflected the county's wealth and overlooked the city from atop Zion's Hill. The foundation is built of limestone, and the building has a brick facade and is topped with a prominent dome, cupola, and flagpole. It cost $60,000 to construct, equivalent to $1,382,143 in 2025.

Over time county needs changed and a new courthouse and Washington County Government Center opened in 1975. Efforts began to reuse the historic structure. Restoration has been funded through donations from local businesses and community groups, as well as grants from foundations. The historic courthouse is now operated as a gathering place and as venue for community, cultural, and private events.

According to its mission statement, "The purpose of the operation of the Washington County Historic Courthouse is to preserve, re-adapt, restore and interpret this historic landmark for current and future generations, especially those from Washington County." To this end, the county works with local groups to preserve and maintain the courthouse and grounds, conducts tours, and provides historic interpretation of the county's heritage. The facility is also available for rental, which offsets some of the expenses of maintaining the structure.

== See also ==
- List of county courthouses in Minnesota
- National Register of Historic Places listings in Washington County, Minnesota
