= Croft & Boerner =

20th-century American architectural and engineering firm

Croft & Boerner was an architectural and engineering firm based in Minneapolis, Minnesota, United States. It was a partnership of Francis Boerner (1889–1936) and Ernest Croft (1889–1959). Several of their works are listed on the U.S. National Register of Historic Places for their architecture.

Both Boerner and Croft studied at the University of Minnesota, completing degrees in engineering. One or both then spent three years in New York City working for Turner Construction Company, a firm then known for its use of reinforced concrete.

== Works ==
Works include:

- Northwestern Terminal complex of buildings (c.1919), Minneapolis, Minnesota
- Harper and McIntire Company Warehouse (1921), Cedar Rapids, Iowa, NRHP-listed
- St. Louis County District Courthouse (1921 addition), 300 S. Fifth Ave., Virginia, Minnesota, NRHP-listed
- Ottumwa High School (1923), Ottumwa, Iowa
- Mille Lacs County Courthouse (1923), 635 2nd St. SE, Milaca, Minnesota, NRHP-listed
- Ottumwa Young Women's Christian Association (1924), 133 W. Second St., Ottumwa, Iowa, NRHP-listed
- Franklin Junior High School (1932), 1001 Kingwood St., Brainerd, Minnesota, NRHP-listed
