= Ottumwa Young Women's Christian Association =

- U.S. National Register of Historic Places
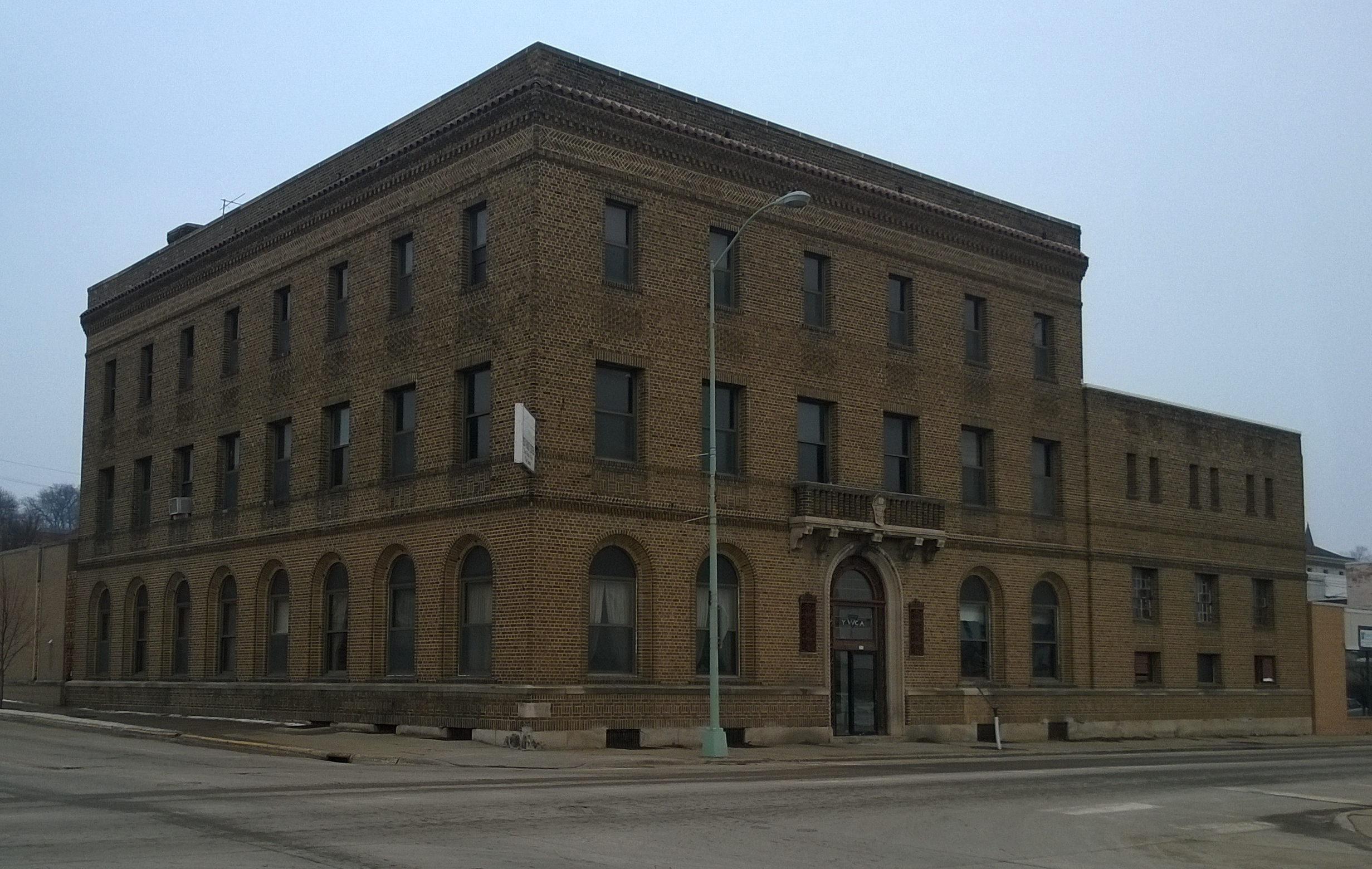

- Location within Iowa Location within the United States
- Location: 133 W. 2nd St. Ottumwa, Iowa
- Coordinates: 41°1′17″N 92°24′46″W
- Area: less than one acre
- Built: 1924-1925
- Built by: C.W. Ennis
- Architect: Croft & Boerner
- Architectural style: Renaissance Revival
- NRHP reference No.: 05000907
- Added to NRHP: August 24, 2005

Ottumwa Young Women's Christian Association , also known as Your Family Center, is a historic building located in Ottumwa, Iowa, United States. Its significance is related to the local social movement that provided a safe place to live for young women and education programs that encouraged their business and professional development. The Young Women's Christian Association (YWCA) was established in Ottumwa in 1894 by 64 charter members. They began with opening reading and rest rooms before they opened a boarding house. In 1903 they acquired the former First Baptist Church building for their use. They cooperated with the local Young Men's Christian Association (YMCA) for recreational and camping activities. The YMCA built a new larger facility in 1921 and the YWCA considered buying their old building, but they decided to build their own building instead.

The YWCA hired the Minneapolis architectural firm of Croft & Boerner to design the Renaissance Revival building. It was completed in 1925 by contractor C.W. Ennis. The three-story brick structure features round arch openings on the first floor and windows that diminish in size on the upper floors. The interior features terrazzo floors and oak woodwork that exhibits an American Craftsman influence. It was listed on the National Register of Historic Places in 2005.

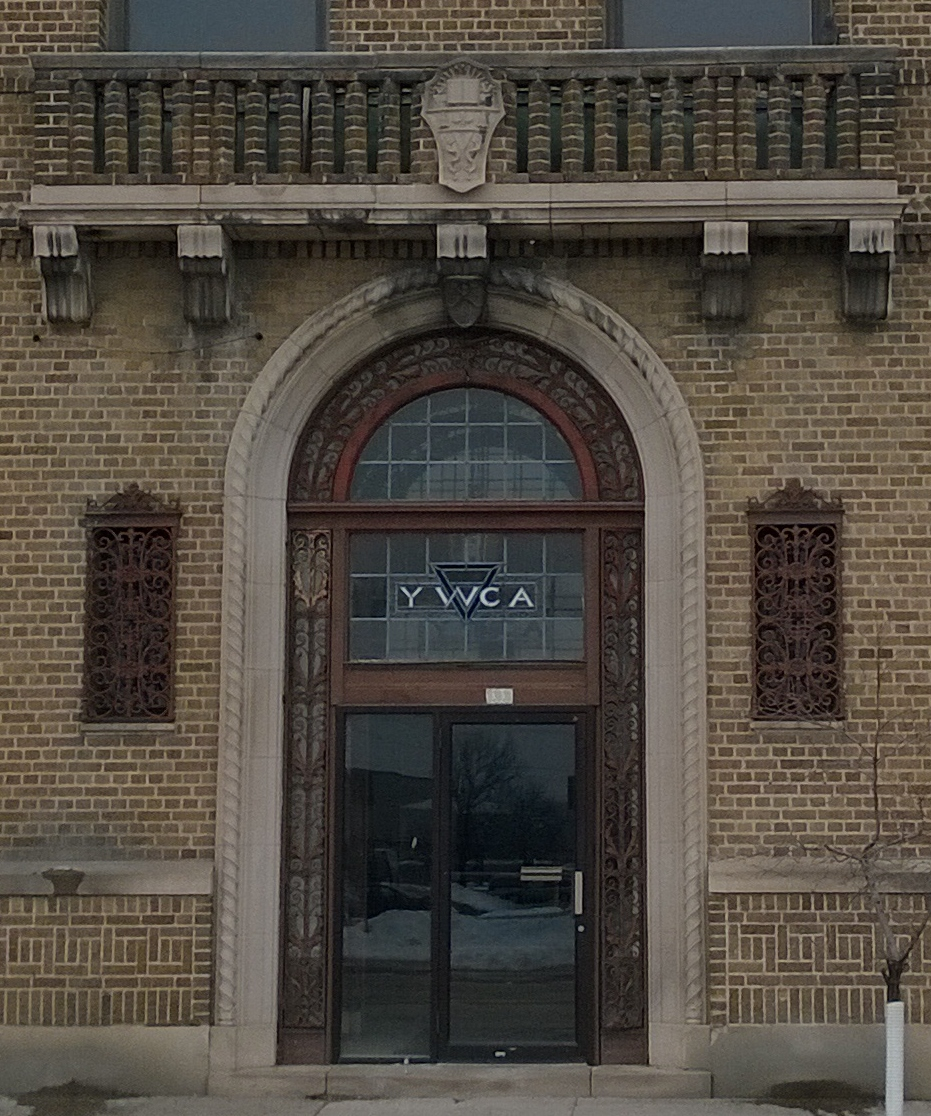
Entrance

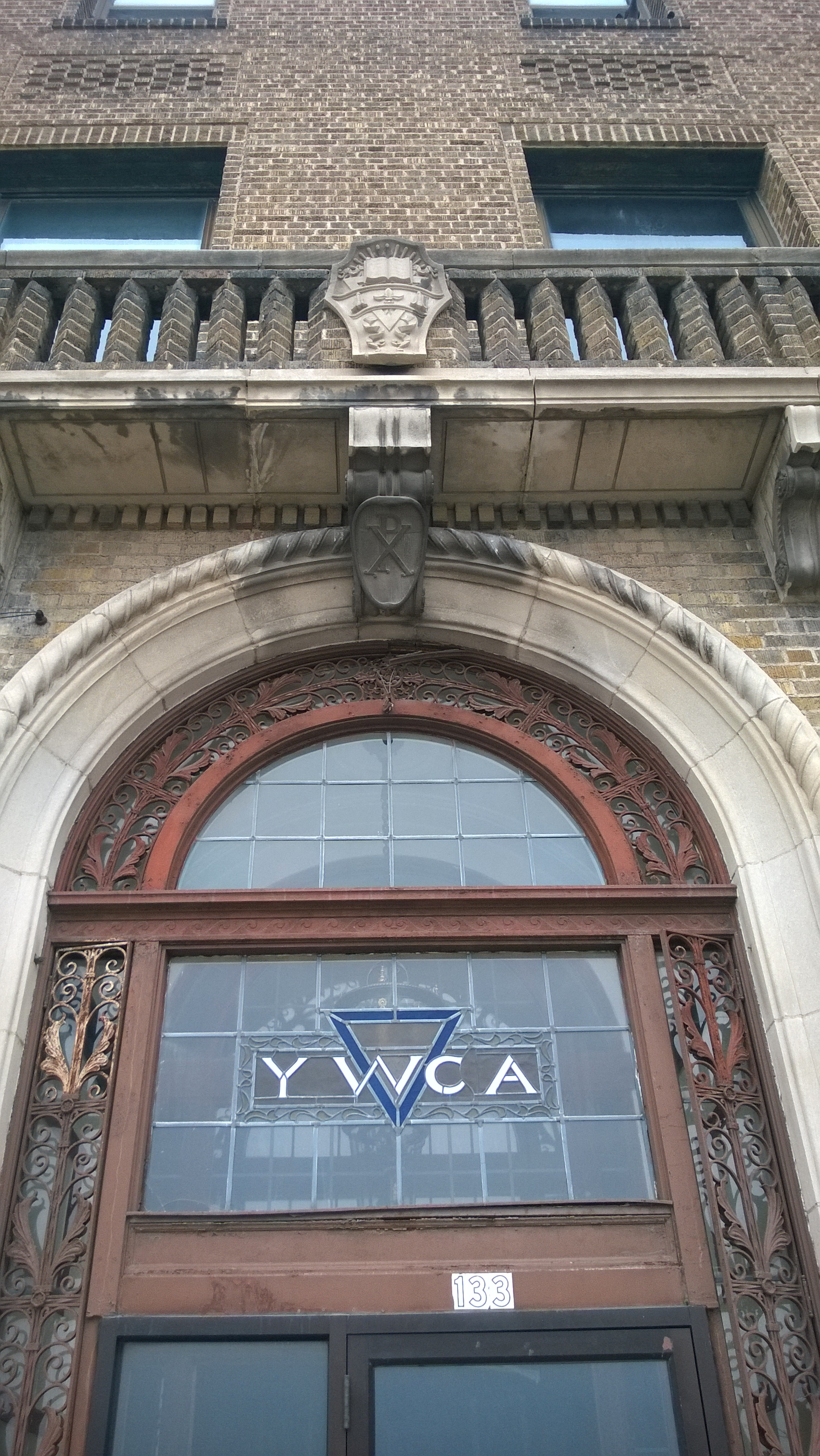
Entrance Details
