= Franklin Junior High School (Brainerd, Minnesota) =

- U.S. National Register of Historic Places
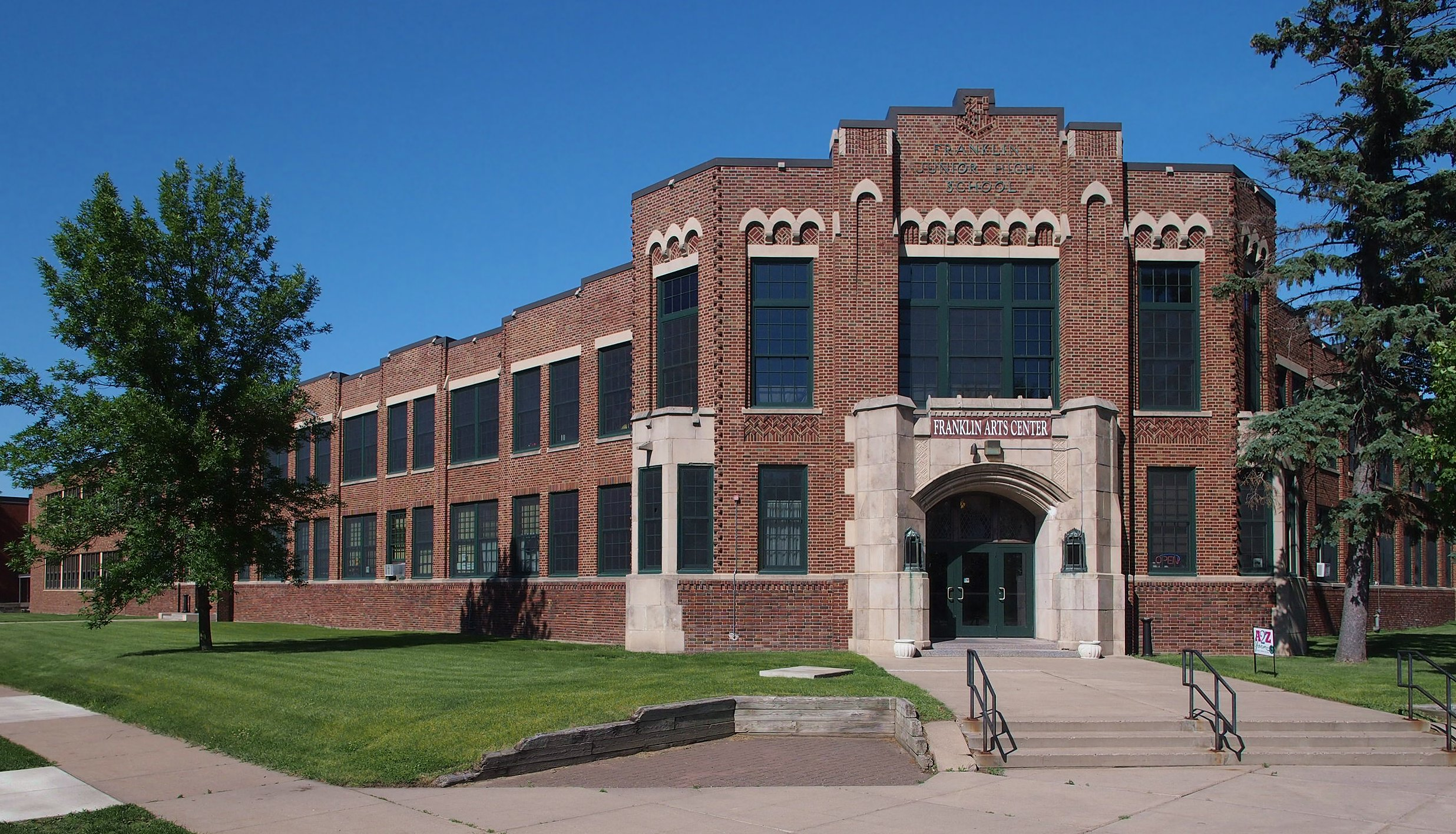
- The Franklin Junior High School building from the southwest

- Location within Minnesota Location within the United States
- Location: 1001 Kingwood Street, Brainerd, Minnesota
- Coordinates: 46°21′34″N 94°11′39″W
- Area: 3.5 acres (1.4 ha)
- Built: 1932, 1954
- Architect: Francis C. Boerner and Ernest Croft (1932), Hubert Swanson (1954)
- Architectural style: Collegiate Gothic
- NRHP reference No.: 09000406
- Designated: June 4, 2009

Franklin Junior High School is a historic former school building in Brainerd, Minnesota, United States. The core sections were built in 1932 and extensions were added on in 1954 and 1962. The school closed in 2005. In 2008 the building reopened as the Franklin Arts Center, which leases residential, work, and commercial space to local artists.

The building was listed on the National Register of Historic Places in 2009 for having local significance in the theme of architecture. It was nominated for reflecting the research-based national standards for middle school design as they evolved through the first half of the 20th century. Novel, early-century features apparent in the original section include large windows for maximum sunlight, an auditorium and gymnasium designed to accommodate large community events, and rooms for specialized instruction in music, science, and vocational training. The later sections show new preferences adopted after World War II, most noticeably smaller classroom windows and a reliance on artificial lighting.

== Description ==
The historic core of Franklin Junior High School, built in 1932, resembles a stubby arrow. The two classroom wings meet at a right angle with a prominent, angled-off main entry facing southwest. Extending at a 45-degree angle to the northeast is a third wing containing the auditorium and gymnasium. New additions in 1954 extended all three wings, particularly the two classroom wings. A further expansion in 1962 extended the north wing, bringing the school's total floorspace from 90,000 square feet (8,400 m^{2}) in its original configuration to about 150,000 square feet (14,000 m^{2}).

The building has a brick and reinforced concrete structure. The exterior is dark red-brown brick with trim of smooth limestone quarried near Mankato, Minnesota. A belt course of stone trim extends continuously just under the ground floor windows. The second-floor windows have stone lintels.

The building's primary façade is the southwest corner, which is angled at 45 degrees. The main entrance is set into a stone entryway featuring a segmental arch topped by a parapet and flanked by a pair of tall piers each sporting a bronze lantern. Large windows on the second floor are topped by a series of stone lancet arches supported by stone corbels. The roofline is defined by a brick parapet which sports a medallion of pattened bricks in the very center. Projecting stone bay windows define the façade's ground floor corners.

The 1954 additions use brick and stone similar to the original section. An entry door in the middle of the west and south façades indicates the corners of the original construction. A recessed bay on the west façade with another entry door defines the start of the 1962 addition.

== Interior ==
The front entrance leads into a ground level foyer with administrative offices to the side and stairs to the second floor. Beyond the foyer, where the building's three wings come together, is the school's 500-seat auditorium. The north and east wings contain classrooms on either side of central halls. The northeast wing extends behind the auditorium stage and contains a gymnasium as well as a basement-level cafeteria and boiler room. Directly over the main entrance, on the second floor, was the school library. The ground floor of one classroom wing housed industrial arts workshops for boys while the other offered home economics classes for girls. The gymnasium was also originally divided in two for sex-segregated instruction.

Although the architectural style of the school's exterior is Collegiate Gothic, the interior has simple details in the Streamline Moderne mode popular in the early 1930s. The foyer is tiled, while there were terrazzo floors in the hallways and maple wood flooring in the classrooms and gym. The terrazzo continues in the hallways of the later additions, but the walls are covered in ceramic tile and the classrooms are floored with vinyl tile.

== History ==
Education experts began promoting separate middle schools in the early 20th century as they began recognizing seventh and eighth grade as an important transitional period. Previously these grades were included in primary school but tended to be too focused on review of previously taught material and left students ill-prepared for the high school environment, leading to a high drop-out rate. When Brainerd's high school building was destroyed by fire in 1928, the city took the opportunity to propose building a middle school in addition to a new high school. Voters approved both projects when they appeared on the ballot.

By the time the two contracts went up for bid, the Great Depression had set in and construction work was scarce (federal New Deal funding for building projects would not appear for another few years). 14 architectural firms competed for Brainerd's two school bids, and the commission went to Croft & Boerner of Minneapolis. Concerned about losing jobs to outsiders, a delegation of local craftsmen lobbied the Board of Education for the construction labor to be drawn from Brainerd residents.

Croft and Boerner's design drew on the established best practices for American junior high schools. These favored H-, I-, or L-shaped layouts and flat roofs, fireproofing, large windows for natural light in classrooms, good air circulation, a well-stocked library, science laboratories, and specialized rooms for music, industrial, and vocational training. Auditoriums and gyms were often planned to serve the larger community as public event spaces. Croft and Boerner's design included an auditorium stage that could be opened up to the gymnasium behind it for additional seating.

A growing student population led to expansion of the school in 1954. The design, by Minneapolis architect Hubert Swanson, once again reflected the latest standards, which had evolved since the 1930s. Most notable is a reversal in opinions about windows, driven in part by improvements in artificial lighting. Where maximum sunlight and air circulation had once been deemed essential, fluorescent lighting was now considered preferable and large windows a distraction. An increased emphasis on physical education prompted an expansion of the gymnasium and improvements to the sports field northeast of the school.

A further addition to the north wing was designed by the Brainerd-based firm of Stengen, Hendrickson, and McNutt in 1962.

== Adaptive reuse ==
By the 2000s Franklin Junior High School was getting too small again for its student body, but the state funds that had previously helped the city expand the existing building had been eliminated. Brainerd was obliged to build a new junior high, and Franklin closed in 2005. Hoping to find an adaptive reuse for Franklin, the school district contacted Artspace Projects, Inc, a national non-profit organization specializing in converting older buildings into art centers. Artspace formally purchased the building in 2008 and completed renovations later that year.

Now known as the Franklin Arts Center, the building leases space to arts organizations and rents out residential and work studios to artists. The school district retains access to the auditorium, gymnasium, and athletic field for sports programs and community events. To preserve the building's historic feel, state rules forbid major alterations to the exterior or the hallways with their rows of lockers and built-in cabinets.

== See also ==
- National Register of Historic Places listings in Crow Wing County, Minnesota
