= Harper and McIntire Company Warehouse =

- U.S. National Register of Historic Places
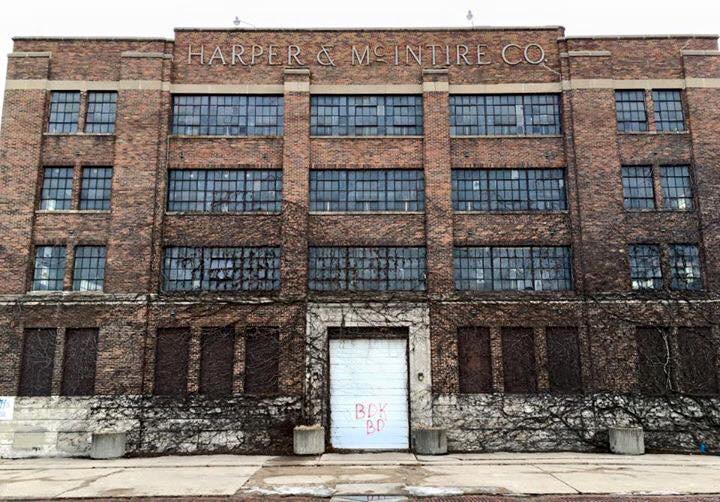

- Location within Iowa Location within the United States
- Location: 411 6th Ave., SE; Cedar Rapids, Iowa
- Coordinates: 41°58′32.8″N 91°39′41.1″W
- Area: less than one acre
- Built: 1922
- Built by: Theo. Stark & Co.
- Architect: Croft and Boerner
- Architectural style: Commercial
- MPS: Commercial & Industrial Development of Cedar Rapids MPS
- NRHP reference No.: 15000758
- Added to NRHP: November 2, 2015

The Harper and McIntire Company Warehouse, also known as Smulekoff's Warehouse, is a historic building located in Cedar Rapids, Iowa, United States. Harper and Mcintire was a wholesale hardware business that was established in Ottumwa, Iowa in 1856. A branch warehouse in Cedar Rapids was begun in 1921. The four-story, brick, Commercial structure was designed by the Minneapolis architectural firm of Croft and Boerner. Cedar Rapids contractor Theodore Stark & Company and Ferro Concrete Construction Company of Cincinnati were responsible for construction. The building was completed in 1922 in an industrial area where spur lines connected it to the Fourth Street Railroad Corridor. It was originally designed as a seven-story building, but by the time it was put out for bid it was reduced to four-stories with a two-story tower that enclosed a water tank. Two additions were added to be building that facilitated the change to shipping by truck. The east side addition was completed in the 1940s, and the west side addition (1962) was built where the railroad spur track had been located. Smulekoffs Furniture Company took over the building in 1981 and remained until 2014 when they went out of business. The building was listed on the National Register of Historic Places in 2015.
