= Oliver J. Holtan =

American politician (1891–1971)

Oliver Julian Holtan (October 19, 1891 – April 17, 1971) was an American farmer, businessman, and politician.

Holtan was born on a farm in Canisteo Township, Dodge County, Minnesota. He went to the Winona Business College. Holtan was involved with the insurance business and was a farmer. He lived in Mantorville, Minnesota with his wife and family. Holtan served on the Mantorville School Board and was the board treasurer. He also served as the Mantorville Village Clerk and as the Minnesota District Court Clerk. Holtan served in the Minnesota House of Representatives from 1949 to 1954. He died in Dodge County, Minnesota.
