= Hubbell House =

Restaurant in Mantorville, Minnesota, US

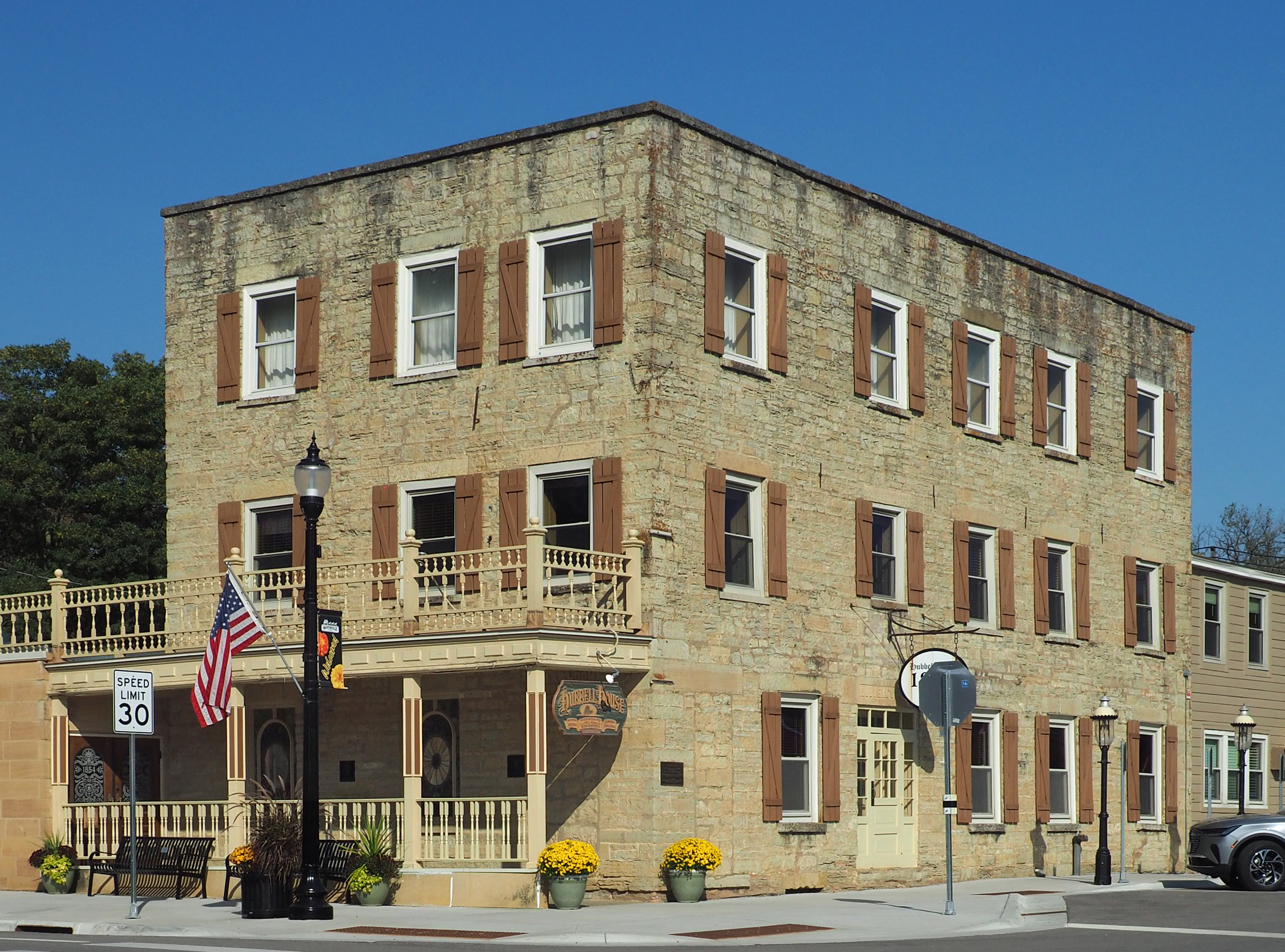
- The Hubbell House viewed from the southwest
- Interactive map of Hubbell House

Restaurant information
- Established: 1854
- Previous owners: John Hubbell, Paul Pappas
- Location: Mantorville Avenue, Mantorville, Minnesota, US
- Coordinates: 44°4′0.7″N 92°45′18″W

The Hubbell House in Mantorville, Minnesota, United States, is one of the oldest working restaurants in the state of Minnesota. It is a contributing property to the Mantorville Historic District, which is listed on the National Register of Historic Places. The restaurant is located on Mantorville Avenue (Minnesota State Highway 57), which runs through Mantorville. The building was originally constructed in 1854, but was rebuilt in 1856.

== History ==
The first structure deemed "The Hubbell House" was built in 1854, four years before Minnesota became a state in 1858, by John Hubbell. It was a two-room log building, and was known by mail carriers and stagecoach travelers as a rest stop along their journeys. In 1856 it was reconstructed into a three-story building made of limestone from the local quarry. After the new building was finished it became even more renowned as a stopping point on the path from the Mississippi River to Saint Peter, Minnesota. It was a saloon and a place to stop for weary travelers.

In the 1930s the building was given to Paul Pappas by his father-in-law and he envisioned a new life for The Hubbell House. Pappas turned the saloon into a fine dining restaurant and revived The Hubbell House to its former glory. Paul died in 1996, but the restaurant continues to be owned and operated by the Pappas family. After over 160 years of business, The Hubbell House still provides meals in a Civil-War era atmosphere with many historic artifacts.

== Famous guests ==
Over the years the Hubbell House has attracted several famous guests. Starting back when it was first constructed, and continuing today, it has brought in many well-noted people who have stopped, including:

- Senator Alexander Ramsey
- General and President Ulysses S. Grant
- Bishop Henry Benjamin Whipple
- Horace Greeley
- Ole Bull
- William Worrall Mayo, founder of the practice which became the Mayo Clinic
- Dwight D. Eisenhower
- Mickey Mantle
- Minnesota Vikings
- Iraqi President Jalal Talabani
