= Hubbard County Courthouse =

- U.S. National Register of Historic Places
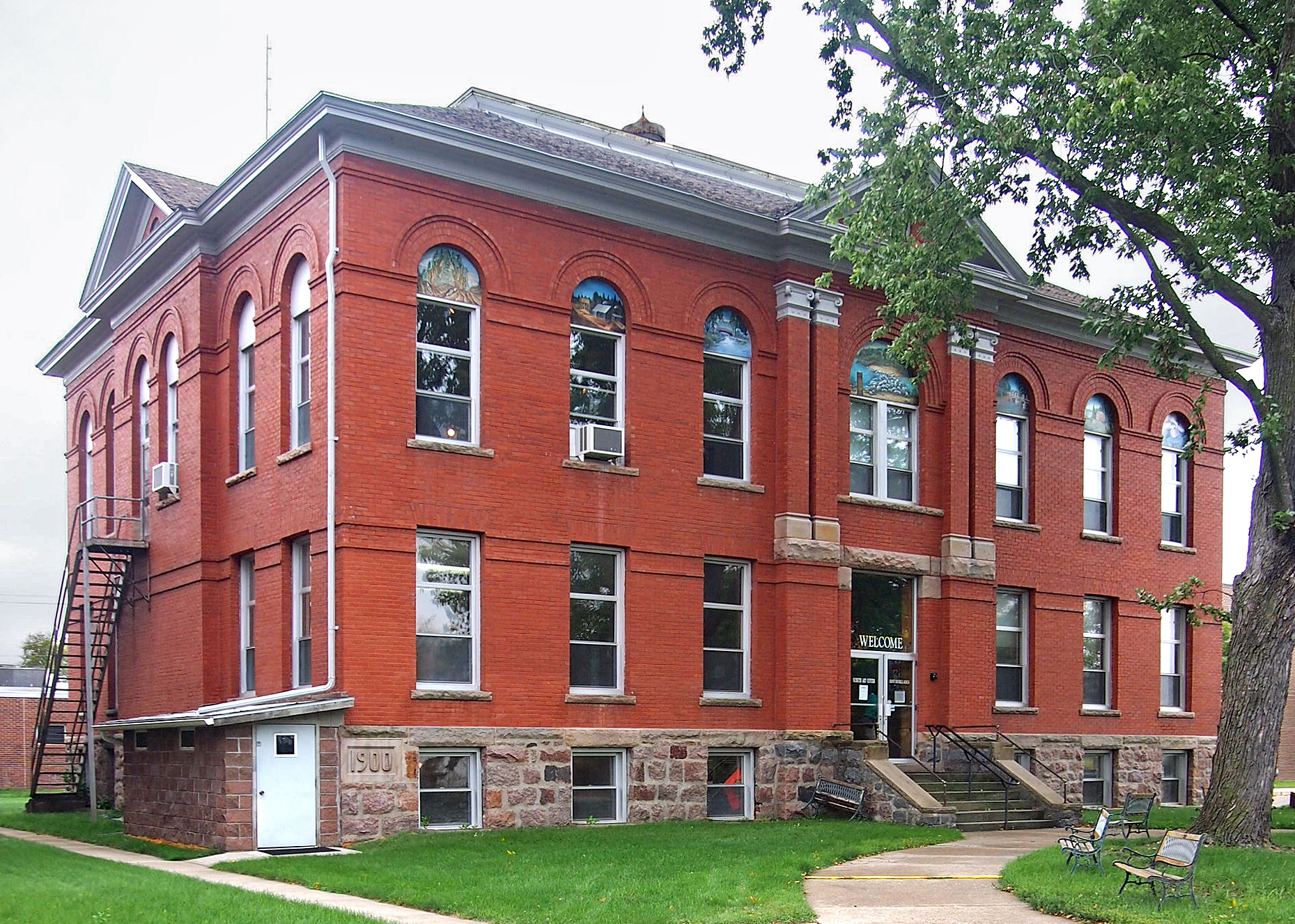
- The red brick building from the southeast

- Location within Minnesota Location within the United States
- Interactive map showing the location of Hubbard County Courthouse
- Location: Court Avenue and Third Street West, Park Rapids, Minnesota
- Coordinates: 46°55′12″N 95°3′49.5″W
- Built: 1900
- Architect: Milton Earl Beebe
- Architectural style: Neoclassical
- NRHP reference No.: 84001475
- Designated: March 3, 1984

The historic Hubbard County Courthouse is a prominent Neoclassical public building in Park Rapids, Minnesota, United States. It served as the seat of government for Hubbard County from 1900 until the 1970s. It now houses the Hubbard County Historical Museum and Nemeth Art Center.

== See also ==
- List of county courthouses in Minnesota
- National Register of Historic Places listings in Hubbard County, Minnesota
