= Mantorville, Minnesota =

City in Minnesota, United States

- City
- Dodge County Courthouse in Mantorville

- Location of Mantorville within Dodge County and state of Minnesota
- Coordinates: 44°03′57″N 92°45′10″W
- Country: United States
- State: Minnesota
- County: Dodge
- Incorporated: 1854

Area
  - Total: 1.48 sq mi (3.84 km^{2})
  - Land: 1.46 sq mi (3.78 km^{2})
  - Water: 0.027 sq mi (0.07 km^{2})
- Elevation: 1,106 ft (337 m)

Population (2020)
  - Total: 1,111
  - Density: 762.1/sq mi (294.23/km^{2})
- Time zone: UTC-6 (Central (CST))
  - Summer (DST): UTC-5 (CDT)
- ZIP code: 55955
- Area code: 507
- FIPS code: 27-39986
- GNIS feature ID: 2395837
- Website: www.mantorville.com
- Mantorville Historic District
- U.S. National Register of Historic Places
- U.S. Historic district
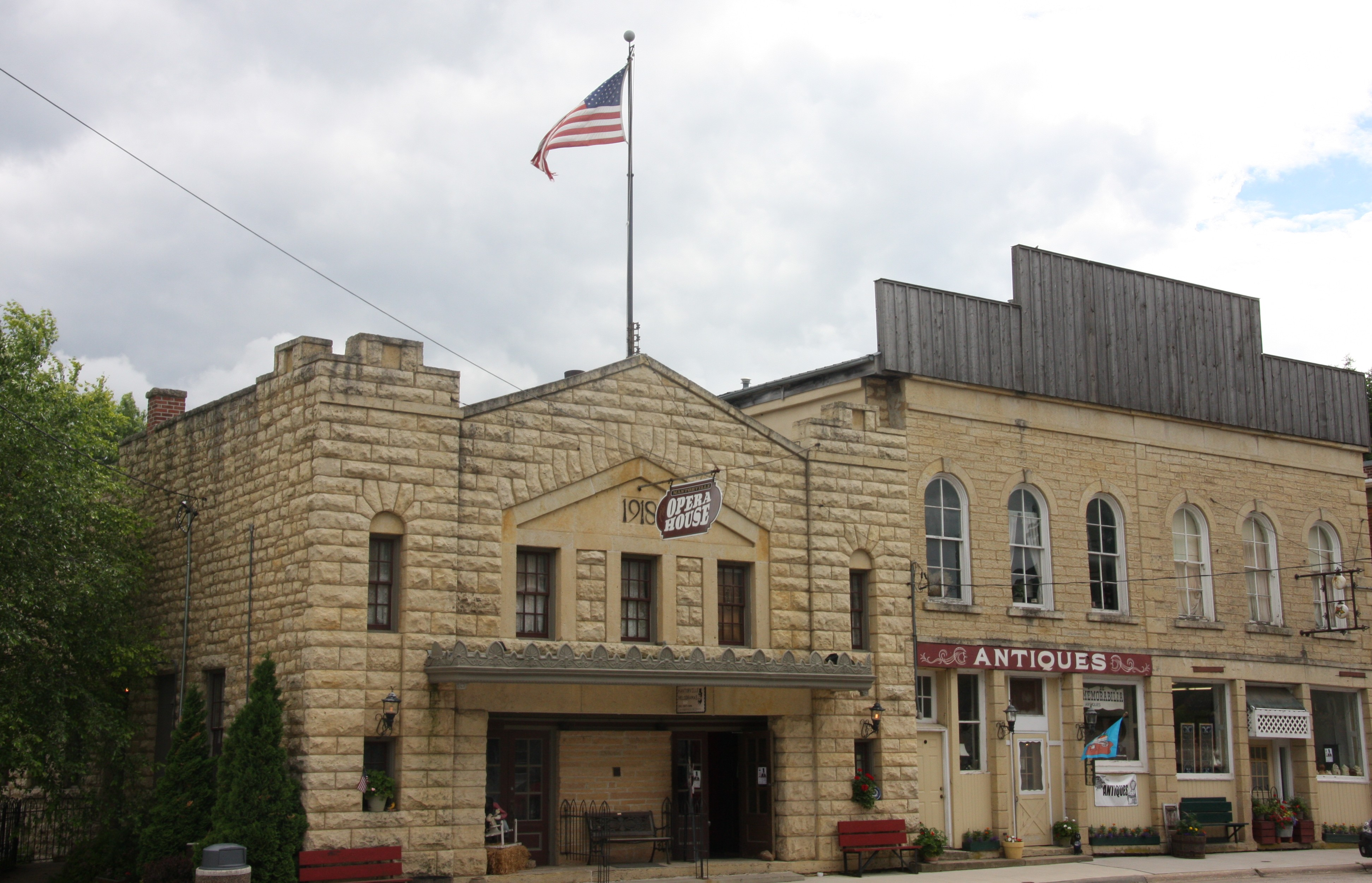
- Mantorville Opera House
- Location: Both sides of MN 57 and Fifth Street, Mantorville, Minnesota
- Area: 960 acres (390 ha)
- Built: 1854
- Architect: Multiple
- Architectural style: Greek Revival, Italianate, Gothic Revival
- NRHP reference No.: 74001017
- Added to NRHP: June 28, 1974

Mantorville (/ˈmæntərvɪl/ MAN-tər-vil) is a city in Dodge County, Minnesota, United States. It is the county seat of Dodge County. As of the 2020 census, its population was 1,111.

== History ==
Founded in 1854, the city is one of Minnesota's oldest cities.

Mantorville is known as the source of Mantorville limestone, which found its way into buildings across the United States. The limestone quarried in the area was soft and easily carved when first extracted, but became harder as it endured the elements, making it a long-lasting building material. The historic Hubbell House used the stone in 1856, and it was likewise used in 1865 for the Dodge County Courthouse, designed by E. Townsend Mix and Minnesota's oldest working courthouse.

Mantorville is named for Peter and Riley Mantor, brothers who came to the settlement in 1853. The Mantorville Historic District, which covers both sides of Minnesota Highway 57 and 5th Street, was added to the National Register of Historic Places in 1974.

== Geography ==
Mantorville lies along the South Branch of the Middle Fork of the Zumbro River, west of Rochester, Minnesota. According to the United States Census Bureau, the city has an area of 1.45 square miles (3.76 km^{2}), of which 1.42 square miles (3.68 km^{2}) is land and 0.03 square miles (0.08 km^{2}) is water.

== Demographics ==
Historical population
Census	Pop.	Note	%±
1860	280		—
1870	622		122.1%
1880	477		−23.3%
1890	460		−3.6%
1900	602		30.9%
1910	410		−31.9%
1920	381		−7.1%
1930	387		1.6%
1940	486		25.6%
1950	477		−1.9%
1960	498		4.4%
1970	479		−3.8%
1980	705		47.2%
1990	874		24.0%
2000	1,054		20.6%
2010	1,197		13.6%
2020	1,111		−7.2%
U.S. Decennial Census

=== 2010 census ===
As of the census of 2010, there were 1,197 people, 430 households, and 331 families residing in the city. The population density was 843.0 inhabitants per square mile (325.5/km^{2}). There were 451 housing units at an average density of 317.6 per square mile (122.6/km^{2}). The racial makeup of the city was 97.6% White, 0.2% African American, 0.4% Native American, 0.1% Asian, 0.8% from other races, and 0.9% from two or more races. Hispanic or Latino people of any race were 2.8% of the population.

There were 430 households, of which 41.4% had children under the age of 18 living with them, 65.8% were married couples living together, 8.1% had a female householder with no husband present, 3.0% had a male householder with no wife present, and 23.0% were non-families. 18.6% of all households were made up of individuals, and 6.3% had someone living alone who was 65 years of age or older. The average household size was 2.78 and the average family size was 3.18.

The median age in the city was 37.8 years. 29.1% of residents were under the age of 18; 6.3% were between the ages of 18 and 24; 26.4% were from 25 to 44; 27.2% were from 45 to 64; and 10.9% were 65 years of age or older. The gender makeup of the city was 50.6% male and 49.4% female.

=== 2000 census ===
As of the census of 2000, there were 1,054 people, 371 households, and 286 families residing in the city. The population density was 741.3 inhabitants per square mile (286.2/km^{2}). There were 378 housing units at an average density of 265.8 per square mile (102.6/km^{2}). The racial makeup of the city was 98.48% White, 0.57% Native American, 0.19% Asian, 0.09% from other races, and 0.66% from two or more races. Hispanic or Latino people of any race were 0.76% of the population.

There were 371 households, out of which 45.3% had children under the age of 18 living with them, 68.5% were married couples living together, 5.7% had a female householder with no husband present, and 22.9% were non-families. 18.6% of all households were made up of individuals, and 8.6% had someone living alone who was 65 years of age or older. The average household size was 2.84 and the average family size was 3.26.

In the city, the population was spread out, with 32.3% under the age of 18, 5.6% from 18 to 24, 34.5% from 25 to 44, 19.9% from 45 to 64, and 7.7% who were 65 years of age or older. The median age was 33 years. For every 100 females, there were 99.6 males. For every 100 females age 18 and over, there were 99.4 males.

The median income for a household in the city was $55,735, and the median income for a family was $62,625. Males had a median income of $39,167 versus $29,464 for females. The per capita income for the city was $20,853. About 6.2% of families and 6.4% of the population were below the poverty line, including 6.6% of those under age 18 and 15.3% of those age 65 or over.

== Education ==
Mantorville shares a school system with nearby Kasson, Minnesota (the "K–M Komets"). The K–M school system is a member of the Zumbro Education school district (ZED).

== Transportation ==
Minnesota State Highway 57 serves as a main route in the city.

== Notable people ==
- Edwin Osgood Grover (1870–1965), educator and publisher, Professor of Books at Rollins College
- Oliver J. Holtan (1891–1971), Minnesota state legislator, farmer, and businessman
- Cordenio Severance (1862–1925), president of the American Bar Association
