= Svenska Mission Kyrka I Sodre Maple Ridge =

Historic church in Minnesota, United States

- U.S. National Register of Historic Places
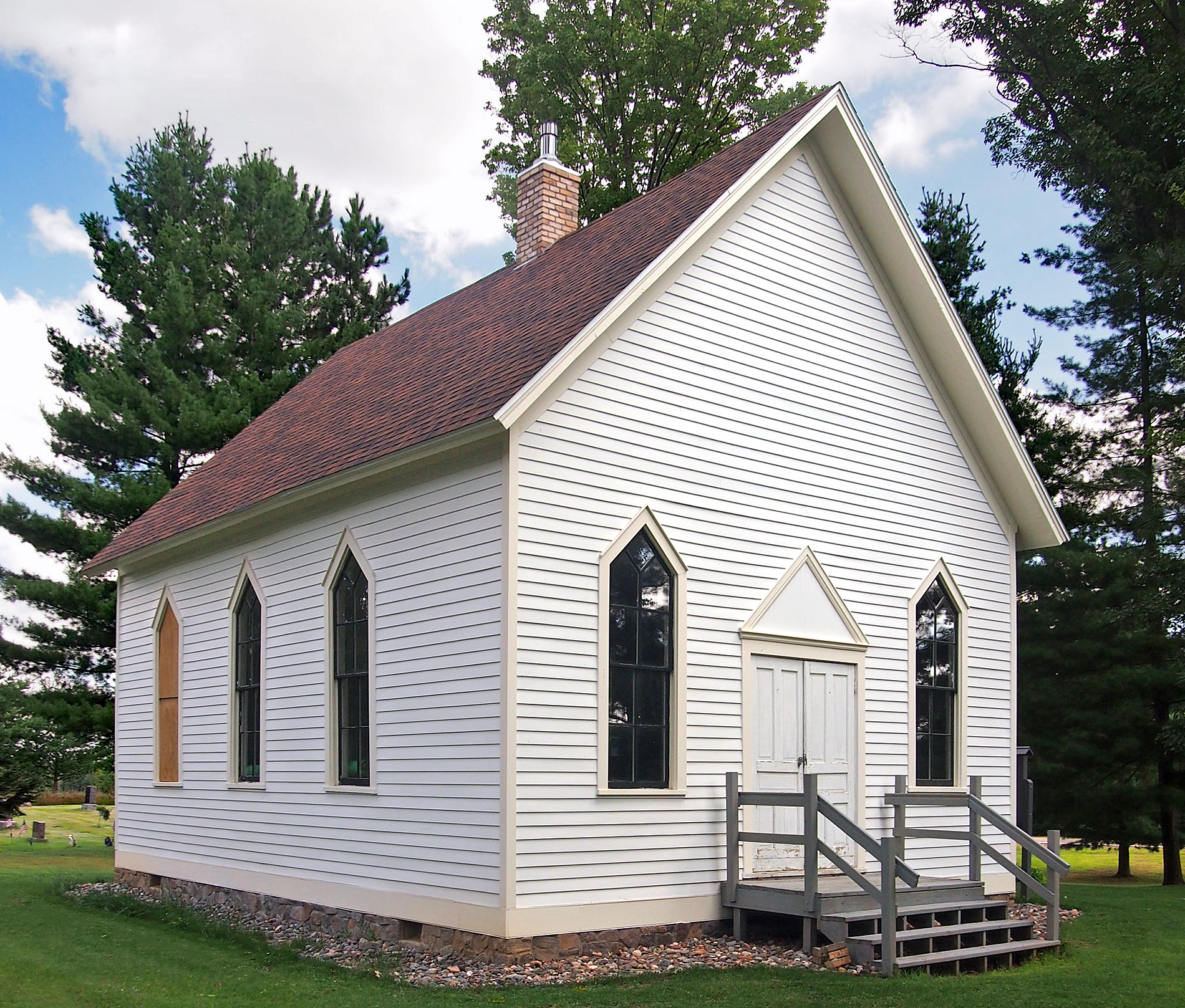
- The church viewed from the southwest

- Location within Minnesota Location within the United States
- Nearest city: Braham, Minnesota
- Coordinates: 45°39′58″N 93°19′40″W
- Area: less than one acre
- Built: 1897
- Architectural style: Gothic Revival
- MPS: Isanti County MRA
- NRHP reference No.: 80002077
- Added to NRHP: July 24, 1980

Svenska Mission Kyrka I Sodre Maple Ridge is a historic church in rural Maple Ridge Township, Minnesota, United States. It is situated on the west side of County Road 1 near the community of Braham, Minnesota. The church is also known as the Swedish Mission Church of South Maple Ridge.

The Swedish Mission Church of South Maple Ridge was established in 1884 by the Evangelical Covenant Church. The simple Gothic Revival church was constructed in 1897. The church building is no longer being used, but it is maintained by the Maple Ridge Cemetery Association. It was added to the National Register of Historic Places in 1980.

== Gallery ==
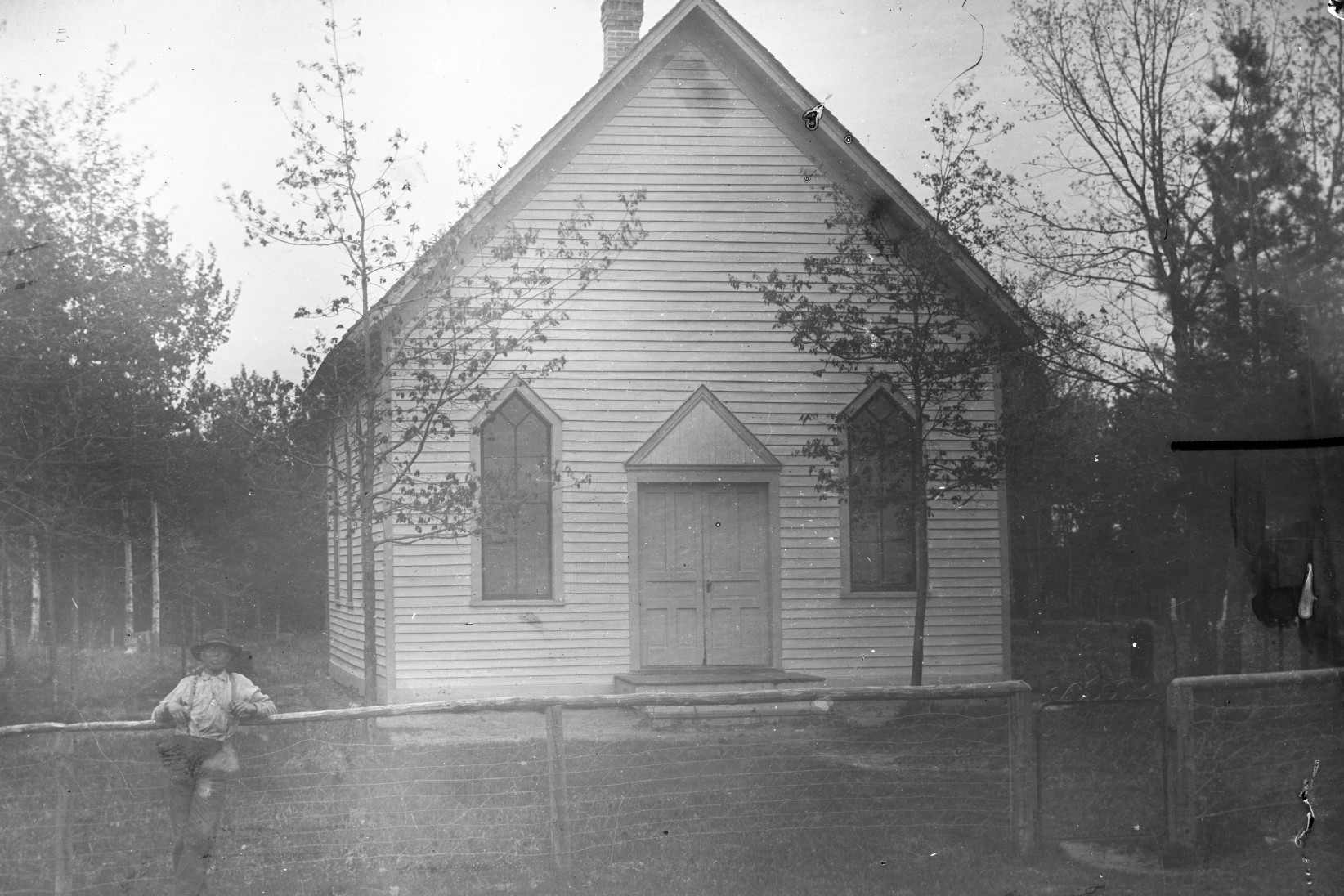
Circa 1910

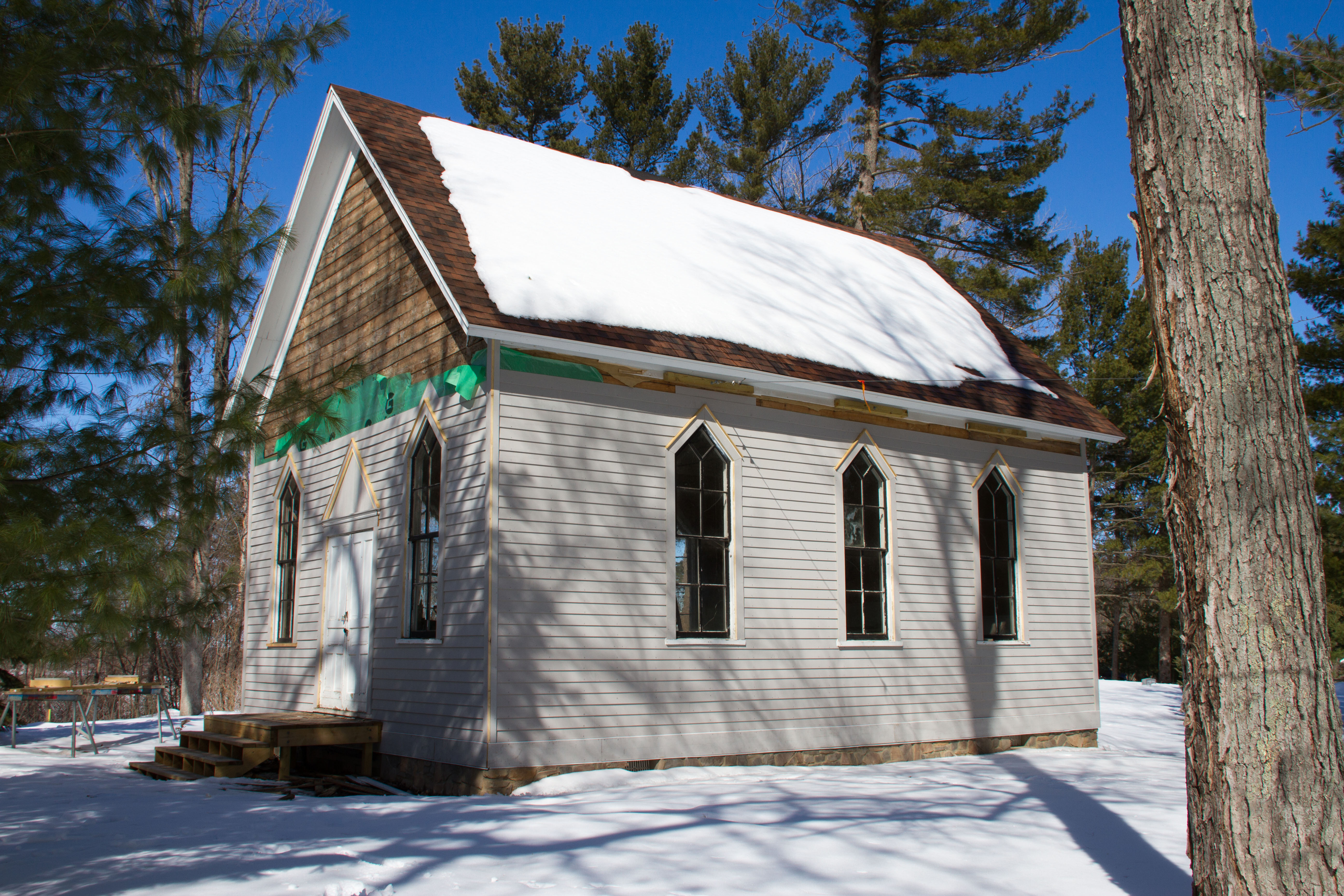
2013 restoration

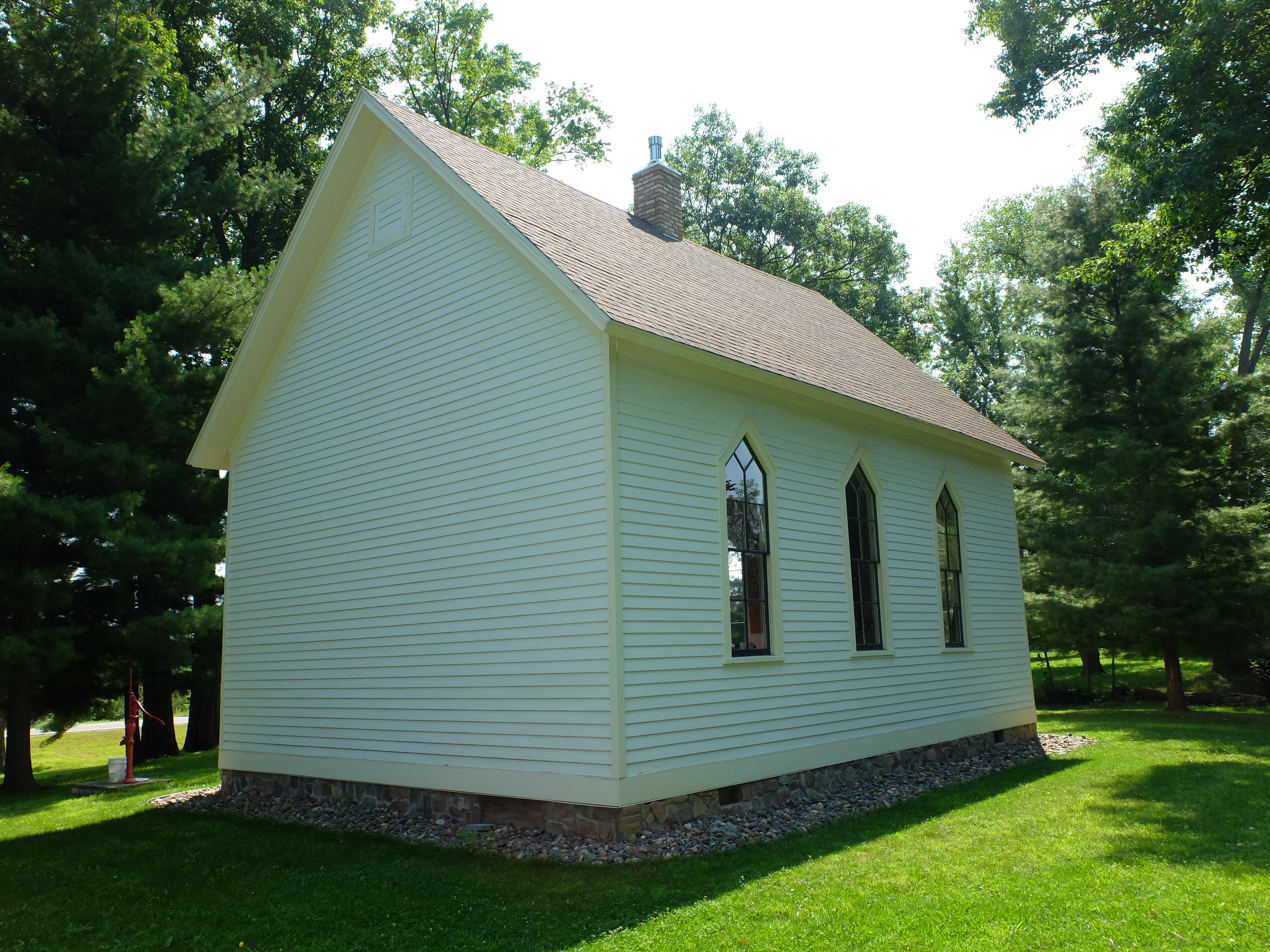
Back of church

== Related reading ==
- Blanck, Dag (April–July 2012) Two Churches, One Community: The Augustana Synod and the Covenant Church, 1860–1920 (Swedish-American Historical Quarterly)
- Granquist, Mark (April–July 2012) Parallel Paths: The Augustana Synod and the Covenant Church, 1920–1945 (Swedish-American Historical Quarterly)
