= St. John's Lutheran Church (Isanti, Minnesota) =

Historic church in Minnesota, United States

- St. John's [German] Lutheran Church
- U.S. National Register of Historic Places
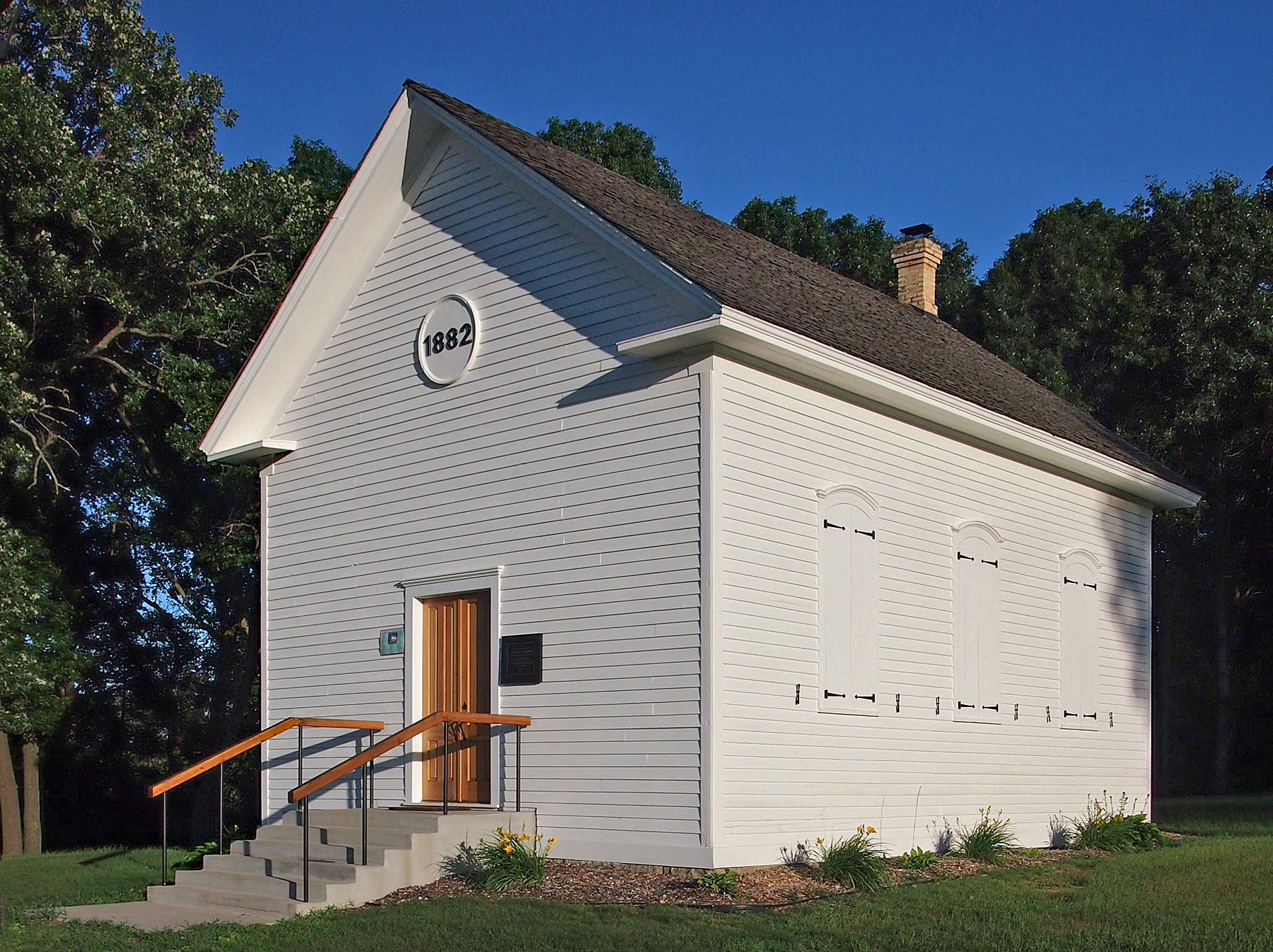
- St. John's Lutheran Church from the northwest

- Location within Minnesota Location within the United States
- Nearest city: Isanti, Minnesota
- Coordinates: 45°30′0.6″N 93°17′20.4″W
- Area: less than one acre
- Built: 1882
- Architectural style: Greek Revival
- MPS: Isanti County MRA
- NRHP reference No.: 80002072
- Added to NRHP: July 24, 1980

Historic St. John's Lutheran Church (German Evangelical Lutheran Church) is an historic church in Bradford Township, Minnesota, United States. The church was built by German immigrants, who were among the earliest settlers in Isanti County, Minnesota. German settlers in the southeastern portion of Bradford Township wanted their own church with services in their native language. Church services were held in members' homes until the church was formally organized in 1882 and a building was built on donated land.

The building is one story high, built in the Greek Revival style, with white clapboard siding on the exterior. The interior was heated with a simple wood stove at the back of the church, and lit with kerosene lamps and Coleman Quick-Lite chandeliers. It also did not have running water or inside bathrooms. The chancel and pulpit were donated by a church in Osseo, Minnesota, that was doing its own renovations. The community never had a congregation large enough to justify having a full-time pastor. The church relied on lay people to do readings, as well as sharing a pastor with St. John's of Weber, Minnesota. Pastor F.J. Mack, who served from 1924 through 1945, began offering services in English and stopped offering services in German. In 1959, the congregation decided to merge with St. John's of Weber after facing declining membership.

In 1976, a restoration project saved the church from destruction, and around this time, the church and its grounds were deeded to the Isanti County Historical Society. The church was listed on the National Register of Historic Places in 1980, but the building again fell into disrepair – until 2004, when a group, The Friends of Historic St. John's, Inc., [now a 501(c)(3) non-profit organization] was formed to support the renovation. With the help of over 300 financial contributors and hard working volunteers, major restoration was completed. The building and grounds are now used for traditional German cultural programs, weddings, christenings, and memorial services.
