= Duluth Civic Center Historic District =

Historic district in Minnesota, United States

- U.S. National Register of Historic Places
- U.S. Historic district
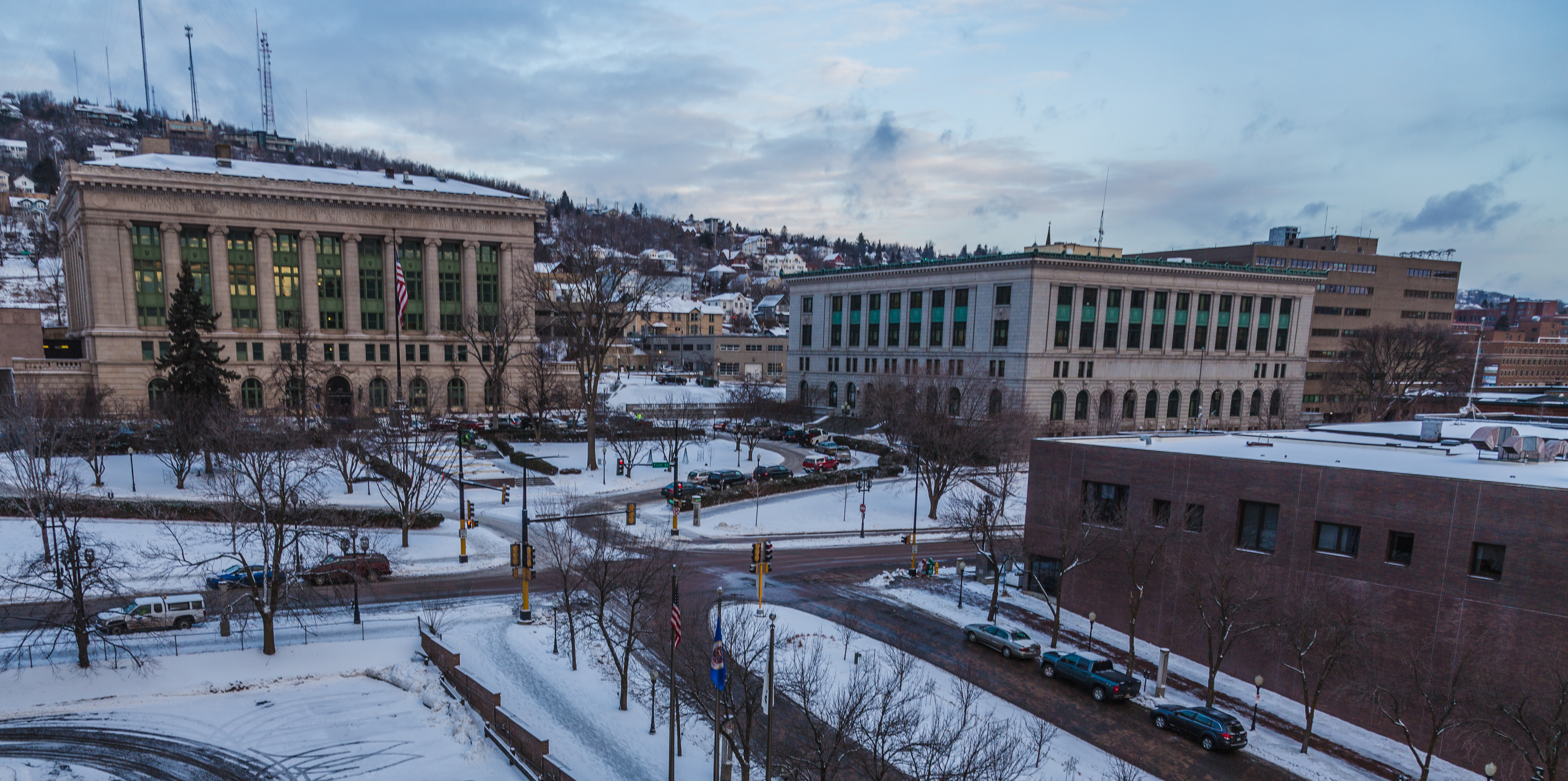
- The St. Louis County Courthouse and Duluth City Hall

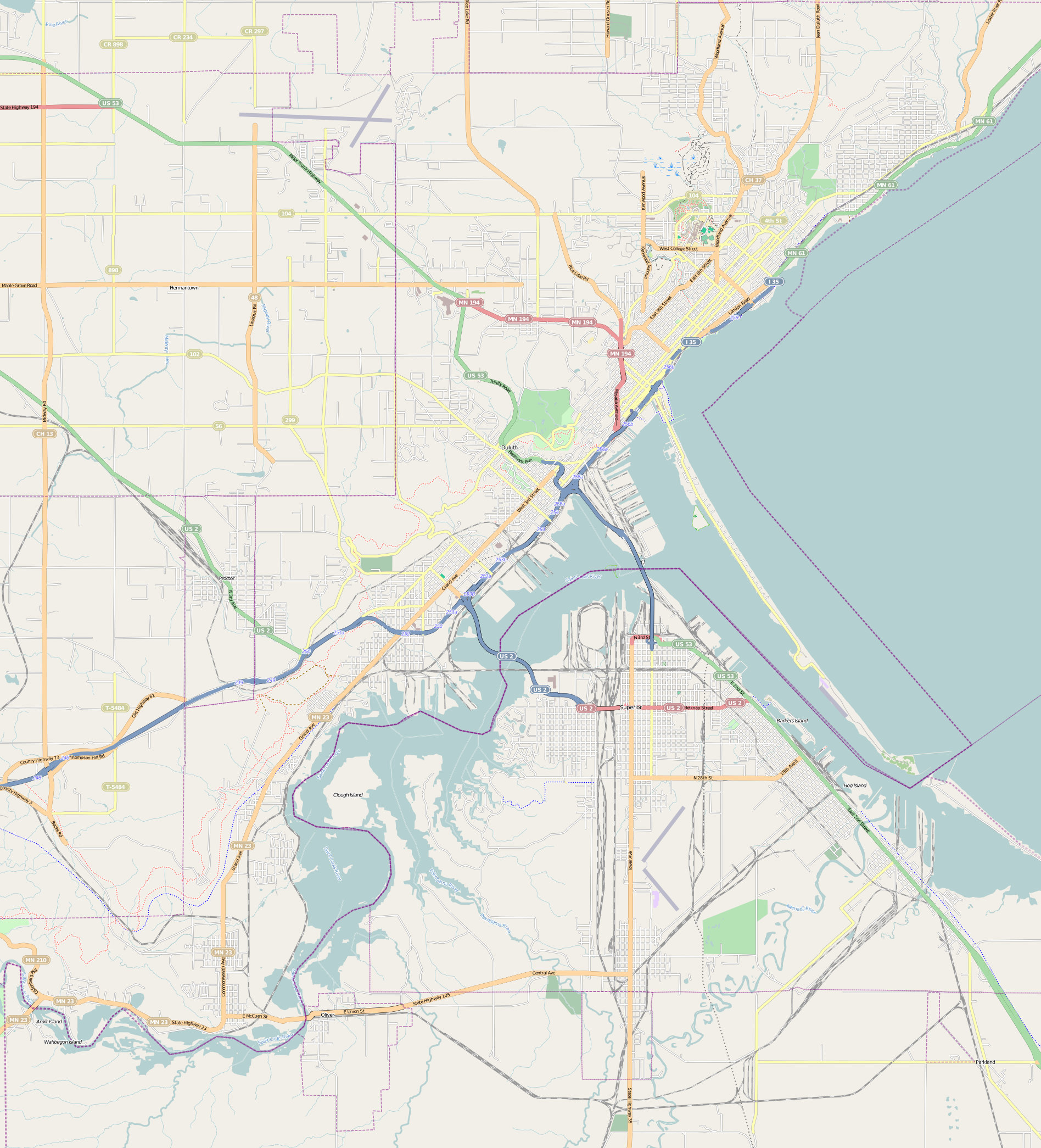
- Location within Duluth Location within Minnesota Location within the United States
- Location: 5th Avenue West and 1st Street, Duluth, Minnesota
- Coordinates: 46°47′0″N 92°6′23″W
- Area: 10.5 acres (4.2 ha)
- Built: 1909–1929
- Architect: Daniel Burnham & Co. (courthouse), Shefchick & Olsen (city hall), Cass Gilbert (monument)
- Architectural style: Neoclassical, Renaissance Revival
- NRHP reference No.: 86003097
- Added to NRHP: November 6, 1986

The Duluth Civic Center Historic District is a historic government complex in Duluth, Minnesota, United States. It includes the St. Louis County Courthouse, Duluth City Hall, and the Gerald W. Heaney Federal Building. The complex was designed by urban planning pioneer Daniel Burnham in 1909 and constructed over the next twenty years. It was listed as a historic district on the National Register of Historic Places in 1986 for its state-level significance in the themes of architecture and community planning and development. It was nominated for its associations with Burnham and the City Beautiful movement.

The Duluth Civic Center Historic District comprises five contributing properties. The Saint Louis County Courthouse, completed in 1909, was designed by Daniel Burnham & Co. as the focal point of the complex. In front of it stands a monument to Duluth veterans who died in service overseas. It was designed by Cass Gilbert and installed around 1921. The St. Louis County Jail, designed by Holstead & Sullivan, was added in 1923. Duluth City Hall was designed by the local architectural firm of Shefchik & Olsen and built in 1928. The Federal Building was constructed in 1929.

A fountain was installed in front of the Soldiers and Sailors Monument in the late 1960s. An act of Congress officially named the Federal Building for former District Court judge Gerald Heaney in 2007.

== See also ==
- National Register of Historic Places listings in St. Louis County, Minnesota
