= Mille Lacs County Courthouse =

- U.S. National Register of Historic Places
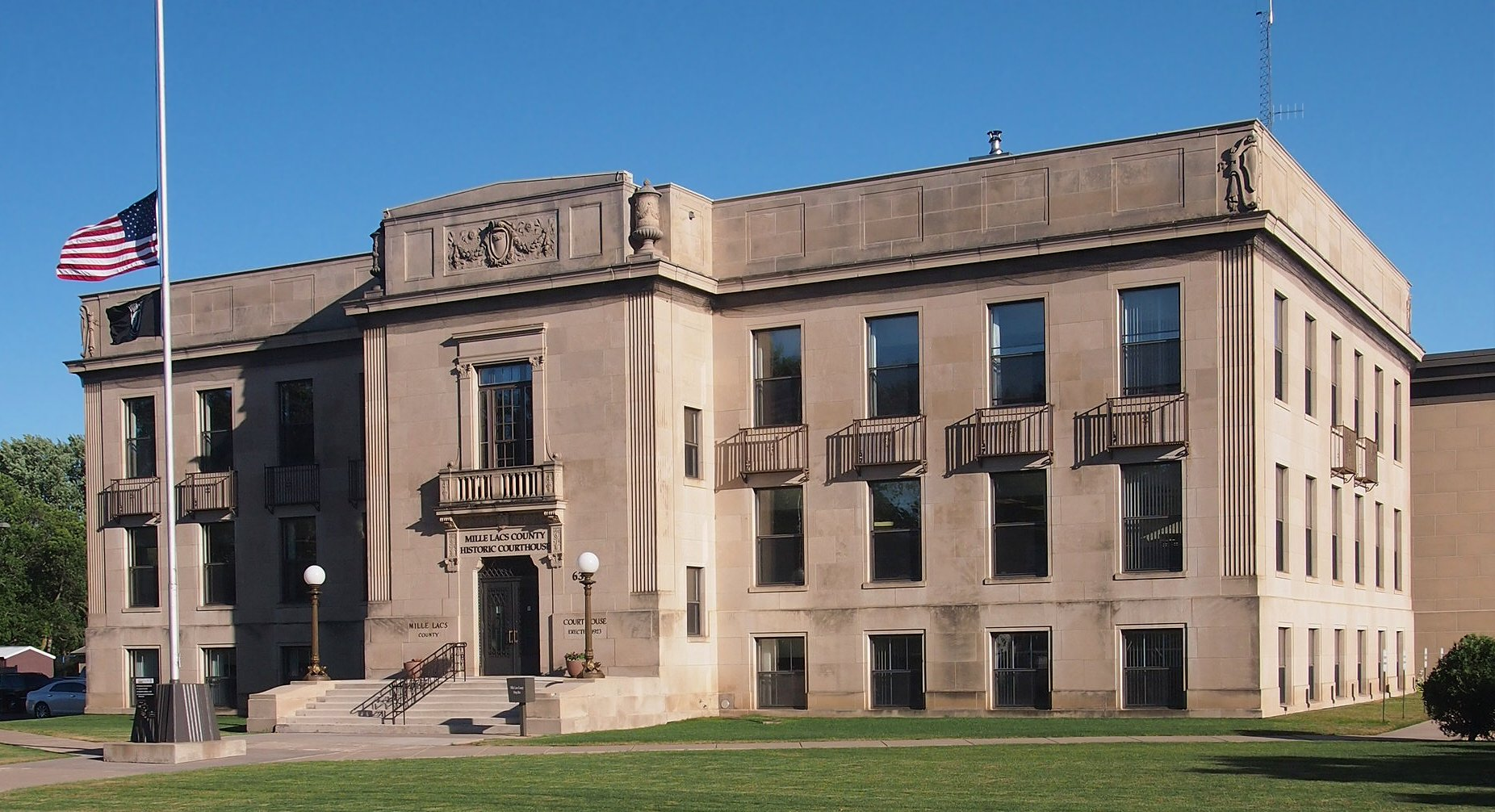
- The Mille Lacs County Courthouse from the northwest

- Location within Minnesota Location within the United States
- Interactive map showing the location of Mille Lacs County Courthouse
- Location: Milaca, Minnesota
- Coordinates: 45°45′15.5″N 93°38′35.2″W
- Area: 1 acre (0.40 ha)
- Built: 1923
- Built by: J. A. McDonald
- Architect: Croft & Boerner
- Architectural style: Renaissance Revival
- NRHP reference No.: 77000756
- Added to NRHP: March 25, 1977

The Mille Lacs County Courthouse, located at 635 2nd Street Southeast in Milaca, Mille Lacs County in the U.S. state of Minnesota was built in 1923. It was designed by Minneapolis architects Croft & Boerner. The facade consists of Bedford limestone over reinforced concrete. A two-story entrance pavilion is topped with concrete "turnings" on the corners and a carved swag and wreath in the center. The windows are adorned with small balustraded balconies. The interior is finished with terrazzo floors and a Wright-inspired leaded glass skylight over the octagonal atrium. Marble steps rise from the front door to the first level and continue to the second floor. Red wood woodwork is used throughout the building. In 1978 the building was renovated by Johnson and Forberg Associates of Minneapolis.
