= Spencer Brook, Minnesota =

Unincorporated community in Minnesota, United States

Spencer Brook
- Unincorporated community
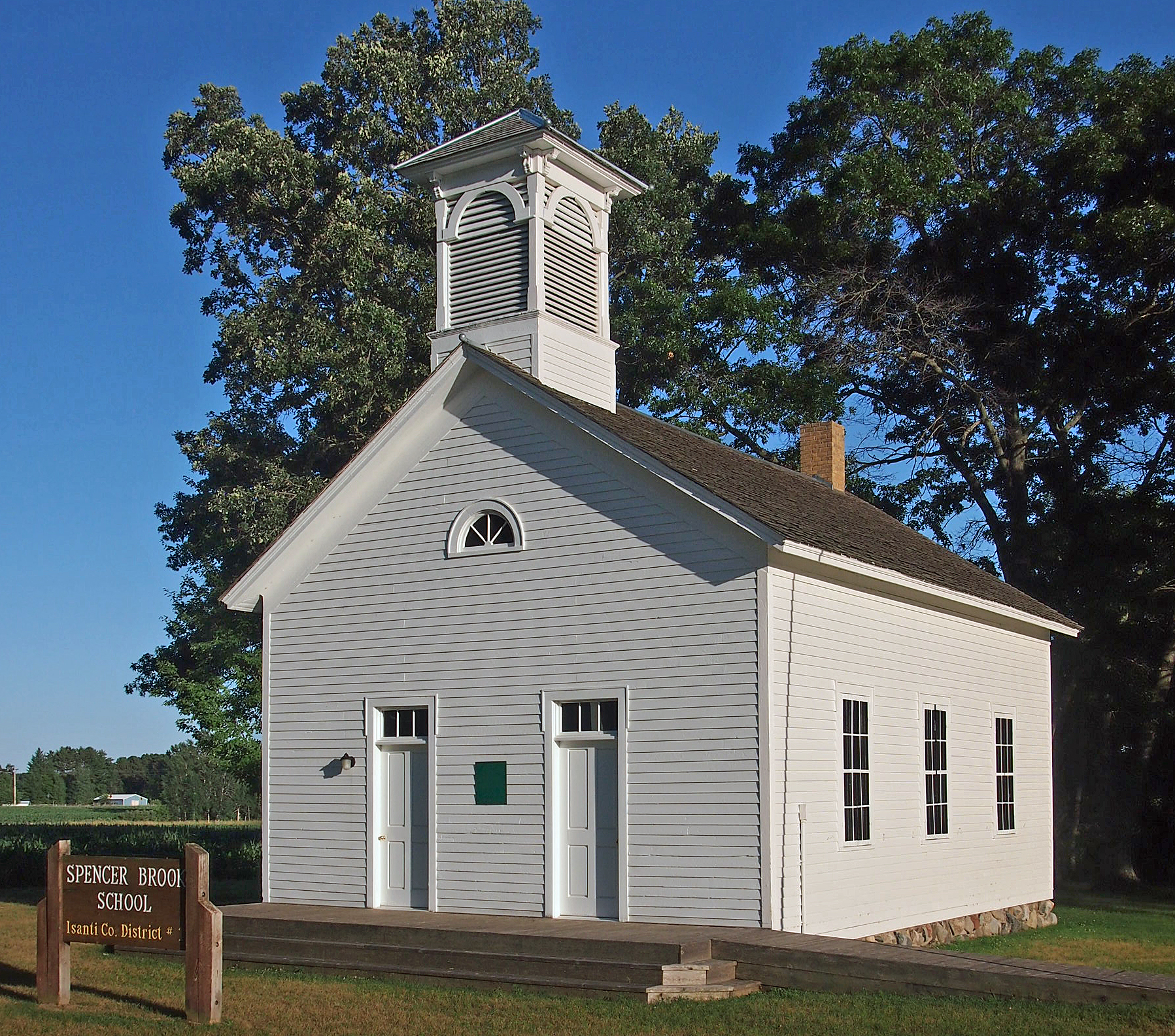
- The 1874 Spencer Brook School

- Location within Minnesota Location within the United States
- Coordinates: 45°31′19″N 93°26′26″W
- Country: United States
- State: Minnesota
- County: Isanti
- Township: Spencer Brook Township
- Elevation: 951 ft (290 m)
- Time zone: UTC-6 (Central (CST))
  - Summer (DST): UTC-5 (CDT)
- ZIP code: 55371
- Area code: 763
- GNIS feature ID: 654954

Spencer Brook is an unincorporated community in Spencer Brook Township, Isanti County, Minnesota, United States.

Isanti County Roads 7 and 40 are two of the main routes in the community. Spencer Brook is located between Bradford and Princeton. The Rum River and Spencer Brook both flow through the community.

Spencer Brook was one of the first communities in Isanti County, settled in the late 1850s by Yankees from the east coast, many Civil War veterans. Spencer Brook includes the historic country school and Able Hearts Community and Christian Counseling formerly Spencer Brook United Methodist Church. It was named after Benjamin Nicholson Spencer (1806-1881) who came from Turkeyfoot, PA and came to Minnesota in 1854 and was Alderman of the 1st Ward of Spencer Brook Township. Benjamin was a Judge, carpenter, and farmer.
