= Gerald W. Heaney Federal Building, United States Courthouse and Custom House =

Courthouse of the United States District Court for the District of Minnesota

Coordinates: 46°46′57.5″N 92°6′25″W

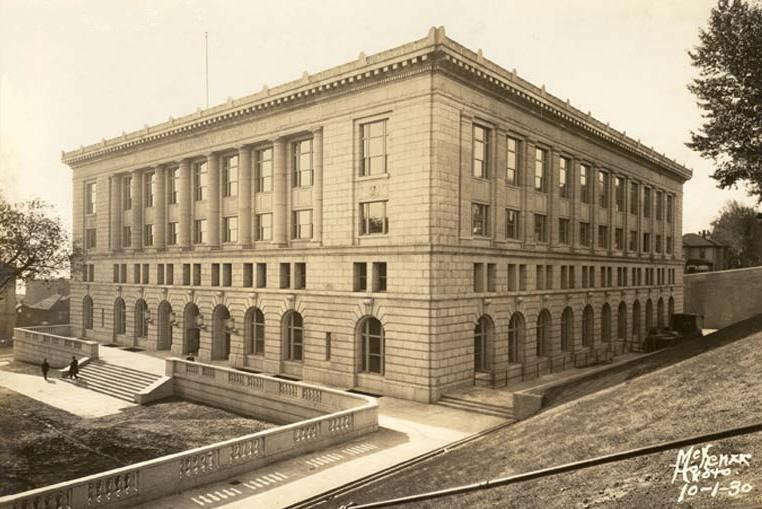
The building as it appeared in 1930

The Gerald W. Heaney Federal Building, United States Courthouse and Custom House in Duluth, Minnesota, is a courthouse of the United States District Court for the District of Minnesota. Completed in 1930, it is part of the Duluth Civic Center Historic District, listed on the National Register of Historic Places in 1986. In 2007 the United States Congress passed an act to rename the building for former Circuit Court judge Gerald Heaney. It was enacted into law that same year.

== Building history ==
Duluth was a small copper mining town until 1869, when it became the railhead for the first transcontinental railway. Its proximity to Lake Superior made it an excellent location for shipping grain. Located near large forested areas, Duluth's sawmills thrived by the end of the nineteenth century, and the city became the nation's fifth busiest seaport. In 1892, the city's first federal building—a post office, courthouse, and custom house—was constructed.

As the city continued to expand, officials decided to create a civic center and in 1907 invited prominent architect and planner Daniel H. Burnham to develop a plan that would include a new county courthouse, city hall, custom house, federal office building, and plaza. A pioneer in city planning, Burnham was responsible for the layout of the 1893 World's Columbian Exposition in Chicago, as well as city plans for Chicago and San Francisco. His plans emphasized the relationship between buildings and their sites. Burnham's design for Duluth, which the city commissioners unanimously endorsed in 1908, incorporated components of the City Beautiful movement, which espoused the use of formal arrangements, axial streets, and monumental, classical public buildings in city planning.

The county courthouse and city hall were constructed first. In 1916, the federal government purchased a site within the civic center for the construction of the new federal building. The U.S. Post Office, Courthouse and Custom House was designed in 1928 by Office of the Supervising Architect under James A. Wetmore, after Congress approved a $1.2 million appropriation. Construction commenced the following year and was completed in 1930.

The building has undergone several renovations. In 1970, the post office vacated the building for a new location, and the first floor was insensitively altered. The building name was changed to the Federal Building, U.S. Courthouse and Custom House at that time. In 2005, as part of the First Impressions program, the U.S. General Services Administration (GSA) restored historic components of the building that were removed or compromised during earlier modifications.

== Architecture ==
The building is located on the west side of the Duluth Civic Center. Designed in the Renaissance Revival style of architecture, the building is compatible with the other buildings that form the Duluth Civic Center Historic District. The Renaissance Revival style was commonly selected for prominent public buildings because it conveyed the dignity of the government. The building displays many classical elements such as a balustrade, columns, symmetry, and classical motifs, including medallions and dentils (square blocks) that define the Renaissance Revival style. The Federal Building, U.S. Courthouse and Custom House was listed in the National Register of Historic Places as part of the Duluth Civic Center Historic District in 1986.

The building is faced with polished granite and has a terra-cotta cornice. A flight of granite stairs with granite abutments leads to the first level of the building. A terrace enclosed by a classical balustrade encircles the building. The first story features rusticated granite with tall round-arch openings topped with scrolled keystones. Small, rectangular paired windows are above the arches. The upper stories, which are defined by a string-course and faced with smooth, ashlar blocks of granite, are dominated by two-story engaged Doric columns that separate large windows. These simple columns indicate the location of interior courtroom spaces. Cast-iron spandrels separate the windows, and carved granite spandrels with eagle motifs are located at each end of the facade. Each column is topped with a medallion. Above the columns, the terra-cotta cornice features a dentil course and decorative anthemia (honeysuckle or palm leaf ornaments) at the roofline.

The interior of the first floor contains public spaces that retain many original finishes and features. The floor of the main lobby is covered with light orange quarry tile with green marble borders. The walls are faced with Mankato stone and feature ornamental grilles. The public lobby floor is covered with Tennessee marble with green marble borders. Mankato stone also covers these walls. The plaster ceiling has ornamental vents and brackets, and original light fixtures are found on both the walls and the ceiling.

The post office lobby is adjacent to the main lobby and contains similar flooring materials. The baseboard, wainscot, and counters are white marble with gold veins. The walls have wood trim and Mankato stone piers. The paneled plaster ceiling and decorative brackets remain in place, as do original lighting fixtures and bronze postal boxes.

The fourth floor contains three courtrooms that are very similar in appearance and retain many historic components. Covered with panasote, a type of artificial leather, doors feature bronze brads and kick plates. Walls are clad in sound-absorbing artificial stone that is an original material. Paired pilasters (attached columns) with Corinthian capitals dominate the wall behind the judge's bench. White marble with gold veins is used for door surrounds, baseboards, and on the steps to the judges' platforms. Original light fixtures descend from the ceilings. Tall, arched windows and large, rectangular skylights bordered in a geometric pattern also illuminate the courtrooms.

As part of the 2005 restoration, GSA recreated historic elements including the original post office window. Portions of the elevator lobbies were redesigned to be more historically accurate.

== Significant events ==
- 1908: City commissioners endorse Daniel Burnham's plan for the Duluth Civic Center
- 1916: Government purchases site for a new federal building
- 1930: Construction completed
- 1986: Federal Building, U.S. Courthouse and Custom House is listed in the National Register of Historic Places as part of the Duluth Civic Center Historic District
- 2005: Historic lobby restored

== Building facts ==
- Location: 515 West First Street
- Architect: James A. Wetmore
- Construction Dates: 1929-1930
- Architectural Style: Renaissance Revival
- Landmark Status: Contributing building within the National Register of Historic Places Duluth Civic Center Historic District
- Primary Material: Granite
- Prominent Features: Two-story columns; Restored first-floor lobbies
