= Dodge County Courthouse (Minnesota) =

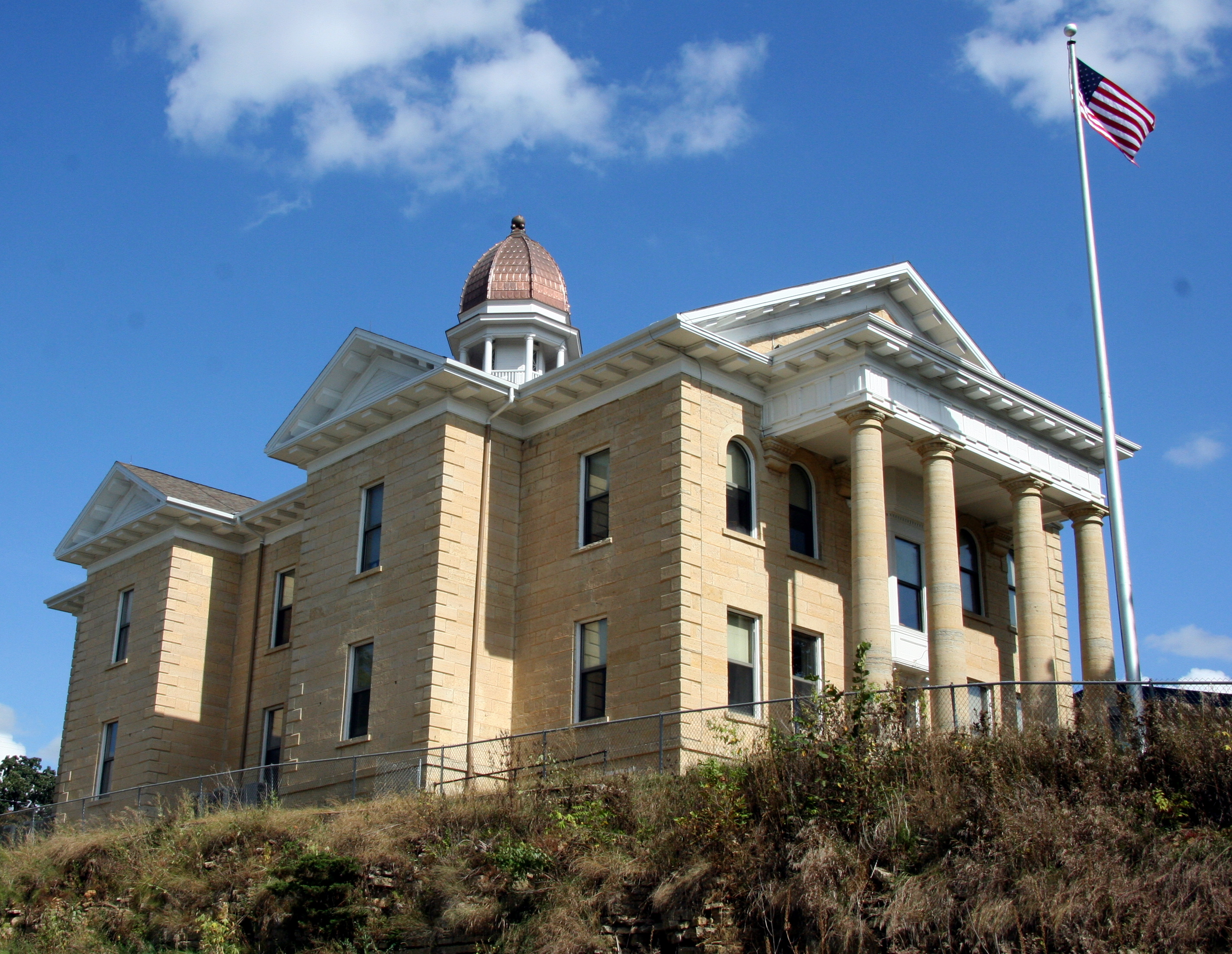
Dodge County Courthouse in Mantorville

The Dodge County Courthouse is located in Mantorville, Minnesota. Designed by E. Townsend Mix, it is the oldest working courthouse in the State of Minnesota.

The courthouse is constructed from limestone that was quarried in the area.
