= Henderson Community Building =

Government building in Minnesota, United States

- Sibley County Courthouse–1879
- U.S. National Register of Historic Places
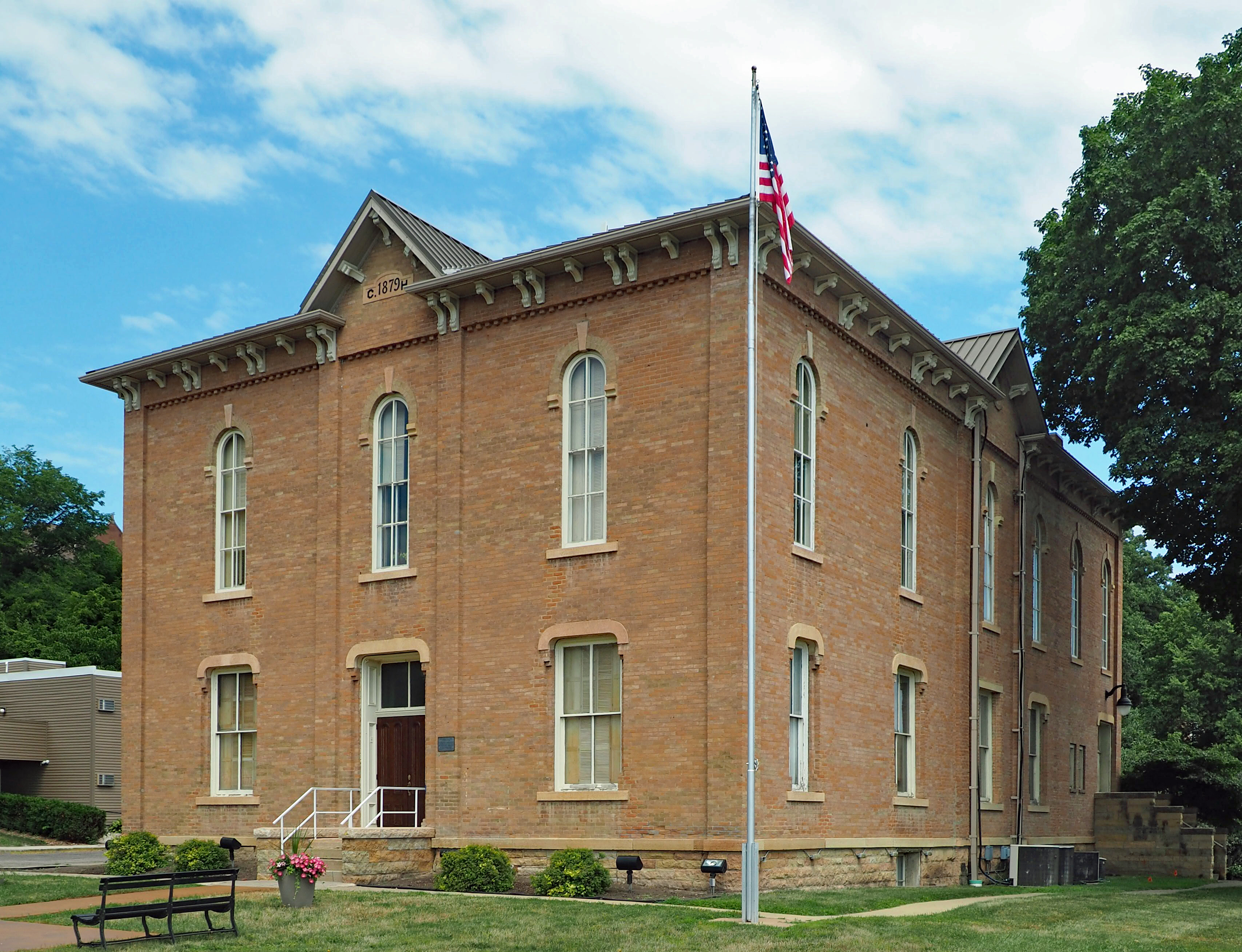
- The Henderson Community Building from the southeast

- Location within Minnesota Location within the United States
- Interactive map showing the location for Henderson Community Building
- Location: 600 Main Street, Henderson, Minnesota
- Coordinates: 44°31′42″N 93°54′33″W
- Area: 4 acres (1.6 ha)
- Built: 1879
- Architect: Frank Barnard
- Architectural style: Italianate
- NRHP reference No.: 79001255
- Added to NRHP: July 2, 1979

The Henderson Community Building, also known as the Old Sibley County Courthouse, is a historic government building in Henderson, Minnesota, United States. It was built in 1879 and served as the home of Sibley County's government until 1915, when the county seat was relocated to Gaylord, Minnesota.

Since 1915 the building has served as Henderson's city hall. As of 2022 it also houses a senior center and the Joseph R. Brown Minnesota River Center. The latter is a history museum containing exhibits on the Minnesota River and Joseph R. Brown (1805–1870), founder of Henderson and a prominent figure in early Minnesota history.

The building was listed on the National Register of Historic Places as Sibley County Courthouse-1879 for its local significance in the theme of architecture in 1979. It was nominated for being Sibley County's first purpose-built courthouse and for representing one of the era's favorite styles of architecture for public buildings: the Italianate.

== See also ==
- List of county courthouses in Minnesota
- National Register of Historic Places listings in Sibley County, Minnesota
