= Maple Ridge Township, Isanti County, Minnesota =

Township in Minnesota, United States

Maple Ridge Township
- Township
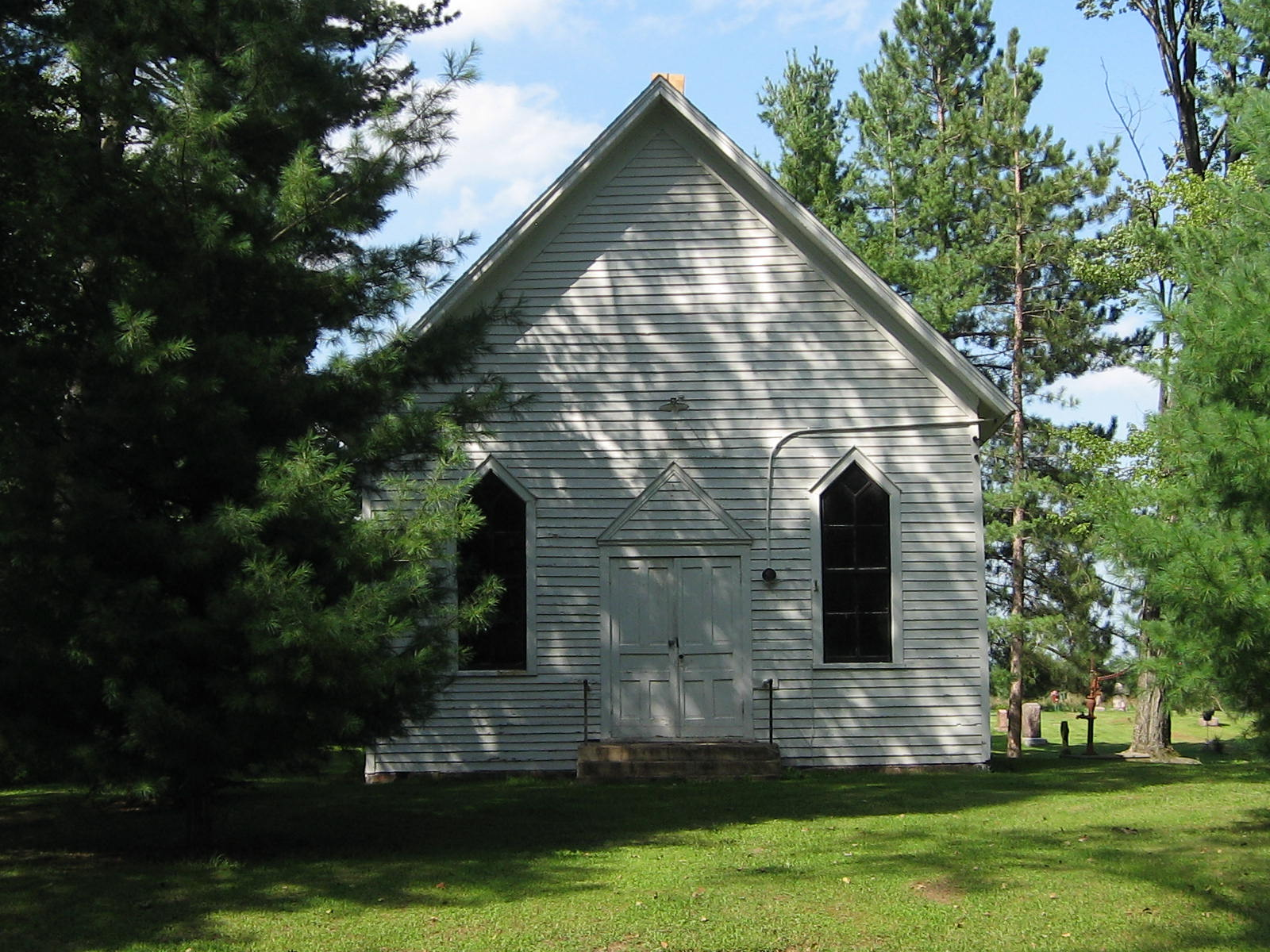
- Swedish Mission Church of South Maple Ridge (Svenska Mission Kyrka)

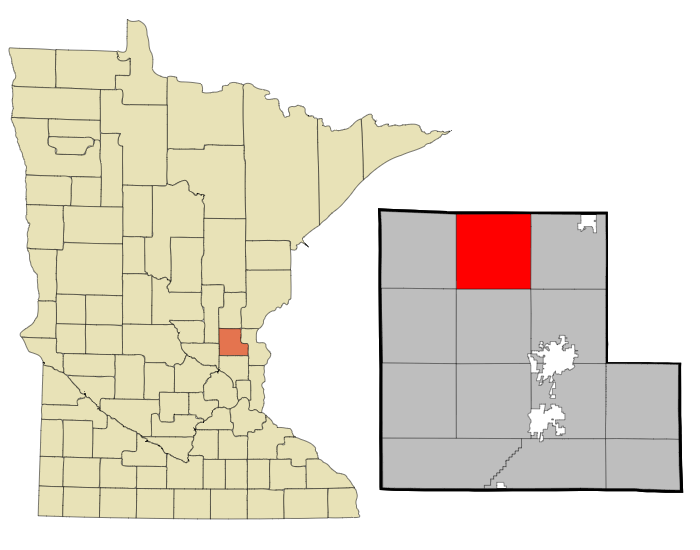
- Location of the township of Maple Ridge within Isanti County, Minnesota
- Coordinates: 45°40′49″N 93°20′26″W
- Country: United States
- State: Minnesota
- County: Isanti

Area
  - Total: 35.7 sq mi (92.4 km^{2})
  - Land: 35.0 sq mi (90.7 km^{2})
  - Water: 0.66 sq mi (1.7 km^{2})
- Elevation: 935 ft (285 m)

Population (2000)
  - Total: 737
  - Density: 21/sq mi (8.1/km^{2})
- Time zone: UTC-6 (Central (CST))
  - Summer (DST): UTC-5 (CDT)
- FIPS code: 27-40292
- GNIS feature ID: 0664906
- Website: http://www.mapleridgetwp.com/

Maple Ridge Township is a township in Isanti County, Minnesota, United States. The population was 737 at the 2000 census.

== Etymology ==
Maple Ridge Township was named for a ridge and the maple trees within its borders.

== Geography ==
According to the United States Census Bureau, the township has a total area of 35.7 square miles (92.4 km^{2}), of which 35.0 square miles (90.7 km^{2}) is land and 0.7 square mile (1.7 km^{2}) (1.88%) is water.

== Demographics ==
Historical population
Census	Pop.	Note	%±
1870	268		—
1880	376		40.3%
1890	554		47.3%
1900	1,015		83.2%
1910	983		−3.2%
1920	993		1.0%
1930	866		−12.8%
1940	839		−3.1%
1950	678		−19.2%
1960	531		−21.7%
1970	655		23.4%
1980	722		10.2%
1990	658		−8.9%
2000	737		12.0%
2010	761		3.3%
U.S. Decennial Census

As of the census of 2000, there were 737 people, 279 households, and 203 families residing in the township. The population density was 21.0 inhabitants per square mile (8.1/km^{2}). There were 299 housing units at an average density of 8.5 per square mile (3.3/km^{2}). The racial makeup of the township was 96.34% White, 0.14% African American, 1.63% Native American, 0.27% Asian, 1.22% from other races, and 0.41% from two or more races. Hispanic or Latino of any race were 1.76% of the population.

There were 279 households, out of which 33.3% had children under the age of 18 living with them, 60.9% were married couples living together, 6.5% had a female householder with no husband present, and 26.9% were non-families. 21.1% of all households were made up of individuals, and 6.8% had someone living alone who was 65 years of age or older. The average household size was 2.64 and the average family size was 3.10.

In the township the population was spread out, with 26.3% under the age of 18, 7.3% from 18 to 24, 29.6% from 25 to 44, 26.1% from 45 to 64, and 10.7% who were 65 years of age or older. The median age was 38 years. For every 100 females, there were 107.0 males. For every 100 females age 18 and over, there were 109.7 males.

The median income for a household in the township was $39,688, and the median income for a family was $47,500. Males had a median income of $35,750 versus $29,688 for females. The per capita income for the township was $18,468. About 3.4% of families and 4.5% of the population were below the poverty line, including 3.6% of those under age 18 and 8.1% of those age 65 or over.
