= Isanti County Courthouse =

- U.S. National Register of Historic Places
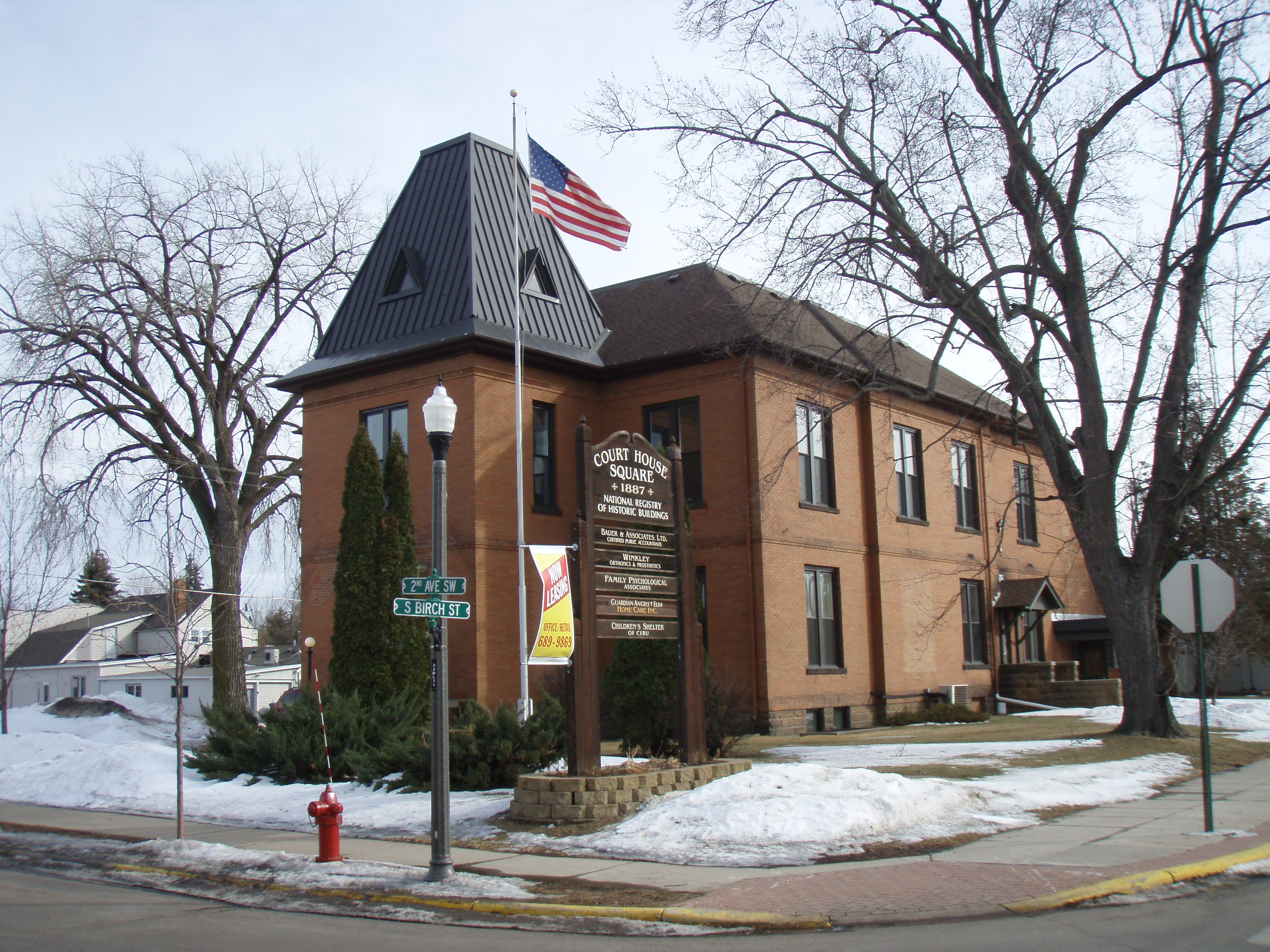

- Location within Minnesota Location within the United States
- Location: 237 2nd Ave., SW, Cambridge, Minnesota
- Coordinates: 45°34′17″N 93°13′34″W
- Area: less than one acre
- Built: 1888
- MPS: Isanti County MRA
- NRHP reference No.: 80002074
- Added to NRHP: July 24, 1980

The former Isanti County Courthouse, located at 237 2nd Avenue, South West, corner of Birch Street, in Cambridge, Minnesota, United States, is an historic two-story redbrick county courthouse built in 1888. Today it is known as Court House Square and has been remodeled into a private office building.

On July 24, 1980, it was added to the National Register of Historic Places.

The current county courthouse is located at 555 18th Avenue, South West.
