= Ottumwa Public Library =

- U.S. National Register of Historic Places
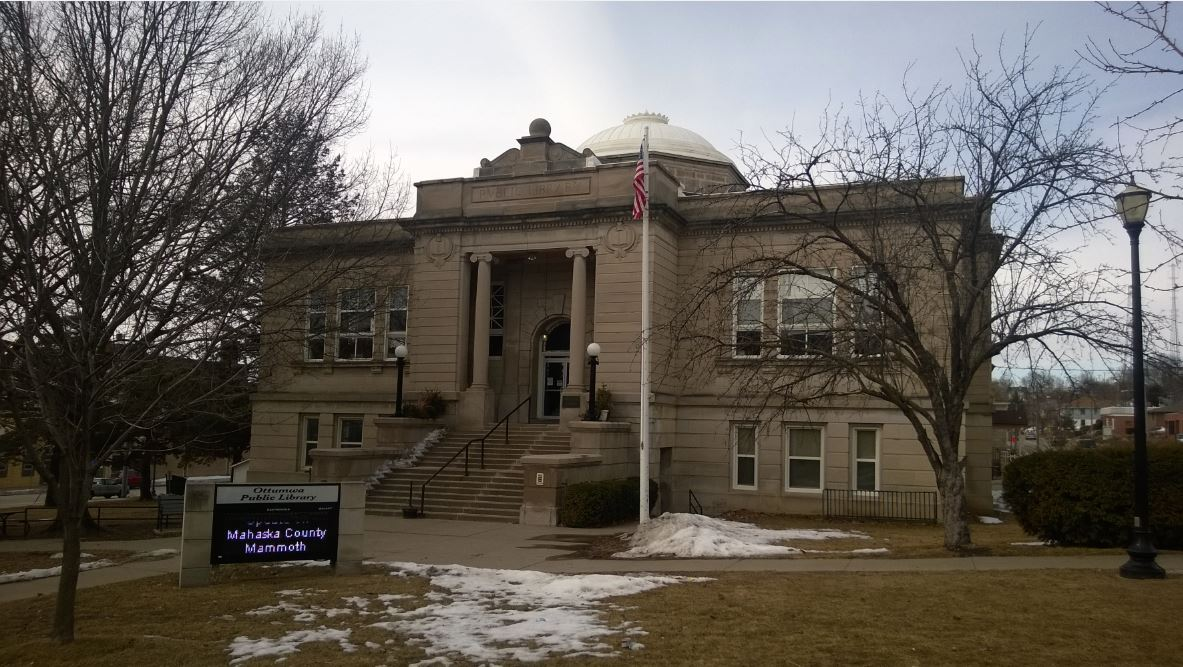
- Image of the Carnegie Library in Ottumwa, IA

- Location within Iowa Location within the United States
- Interactive map showing the location for Ottumwa Public Library
- Location: 102 W. Fourth St. Ottumwa, Iowa
- Coordinates: 41°1′11″N 92°24′31″W
- Area: less than one acre
- Built: 1901–1902
- Architect: Smith & Gutterson
- Architectural style: Classical Revival
- NRHP reference No.: 84001605
- Added to NRHP: April 27, 1984

Ottumwa Public Library is a public library located in downtown Ottumwa, Iowa, United States. The current building was built in 1902. It is part of the Central Park area, which is the civic center of the community. It includes the Wapello County Courthouse, Ottumwa City Hall, and St. Mary of the Visitation Catholic Church. The library was listed on the National Register of Historic Places in 1984.

== History ==
The Ottumwa Library Association was formed in 1872. Peter G. Ballingall, who was in part responsible for the Coal Palace, left a portion of his estate to the library in 1891. Local newspaper editor H. R. Moore contacted Andrew Carnegie about providing a grant for a new library building. Carnegie agreed to grant the city of Ottumwa $50,000 on January 16, 1900. It came with the usual stipulation that the city contribute the land and $5,000 per year, or 10% of the grant, for upkeep. However, Iowa law did not provide for first-class cities of less than 25,000 people to levy taxes for a library. The Iowa General Assembly passed special legislation later that year granting Ottumwa that right.

The Des Moines architectural firm of Smith and Gutterson was chosen in a contest out of 14 entries to design the building. The new building was dedicated on September 24, 1902, at a program held in the Market Street Theatre. Mary E. Downey was the librarian at the time of the dedication. Local businessman, J.T. Hackworth, used his estate to establish a trust in 1921 to support the library.

== Architecture ==
The library building is a fine example of the Neo-Classical style. The two-story building rests on a raised basement and is topped by a shallow Roman style dome. It features a symmetrical façade and a projecting portico. The exterior walls are covered in grey Bedford stone that is cut into smooth ashlar blocks. Larger blocks, or quoins, are featured on the corners of the building. The original main doors were replaced c. 1950, but the original iron scrollwork remains in the transom area.

The interior of the building has retained its original layout. It features a central rotunda that is flanked by two reading rooms. The library stacks are located in the room at the rear of the building.

The interior dome is highlighted with stained glass in the center. A local painter named Johannes Scheiwe painted a mural in the dome and allegorical figures in the spandrels below. Because of water damage the dome was re-plastered and painted in the 1940s. The allegorical figures of the arts, poetry, history, and science were spared. They are clothed in both Classical and Victorian dress. The rotunda also retains the original tile floor. The hexagonal tiles feature a creamy white center area and blue and grey patterned border.
