= Ottumwa High School =

Public secondary school in Ottumwa, Iowa, United States

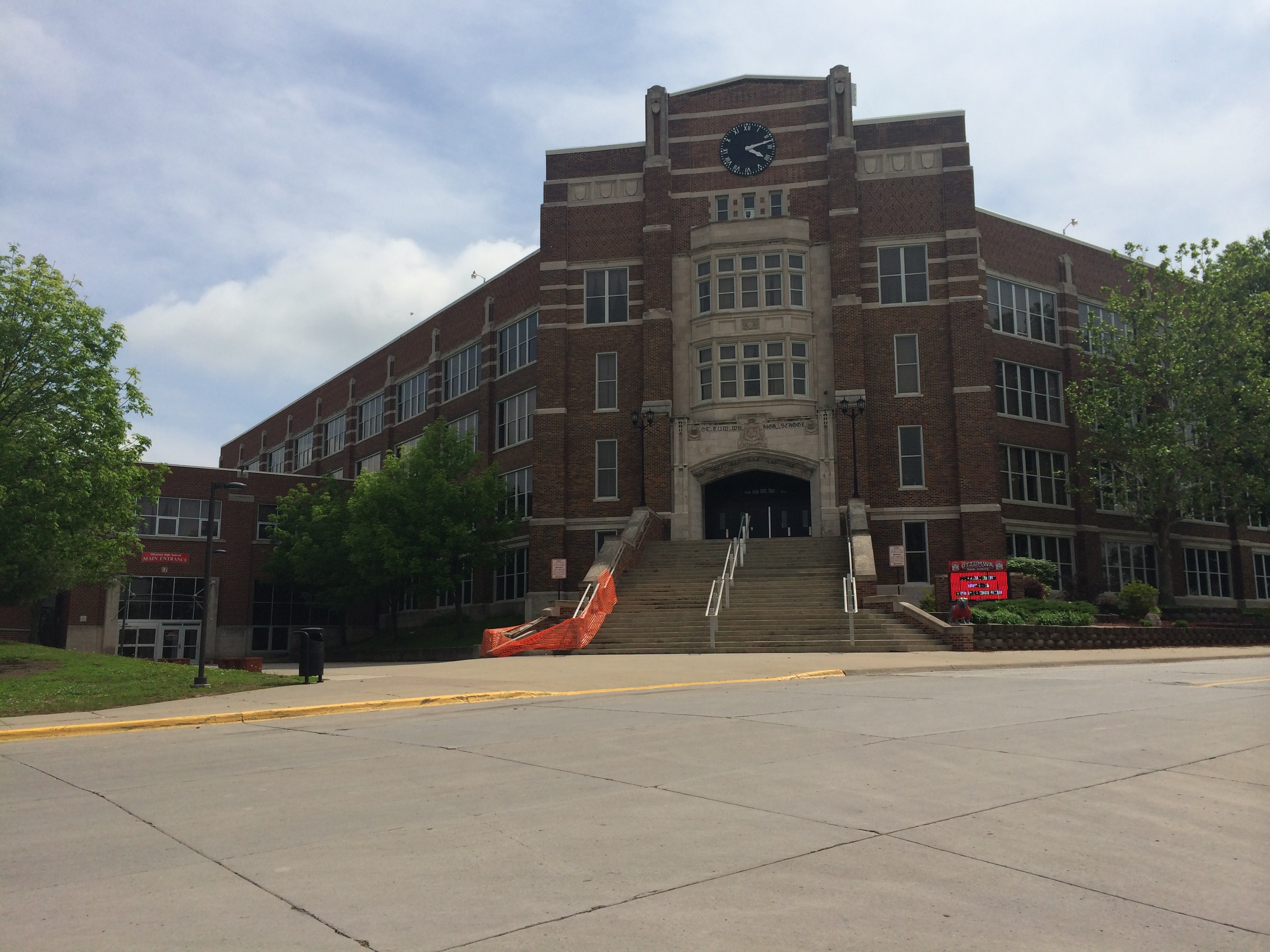
- Ottumwa High School

Location
- 501 E 2nd St; Ottumwa, Iowa 52501; United States; 41.015°N 92.406°W

Information
- School type: Public
- Established: 1923
- School district: Ottumwa Community School District
- Superintendent: Mike McGrory
- Principal: Shelley Bramschreiber
- Teaching staff: 81.93 (FTE)
- Enrollment: 1,239 (2023-2024)
- Student to teacher ratio: 15.12
- Colors: Red & white
- Athletics conference: Iowa Alliance Conference
- Sports: 14
- Mascot: Bulldog
- Website: ohs.ottumwaschools.com

Ottumwa High School is a public high school located in Ottumwa, Iowa, United States. It is part of the Ottumwa Community School District, and is the district's only high school. It was established in 1923. The school sports mascot is a bulldog.

== History ==
For several years, students in Ottumwa attended private classes inside area homes. Later, some students studied inside a local Methodist Episcopal church. In 1865, the first public school in Ottumwa—Adams School—was completed at "College Square", an area bounded by College, Fourth, Second, and Union Streets. The school, which utilized four classrooms on its top floor for the high school, cost $28,818.57 to build, and it sat on the same site as the present-day high school. It was declared unsafe in 1883. The school board voted to tear down the condemned building and build a new one at the same site. With more citizens coming to Ottumwa, an additional high school was constructed about a mile west of the Adams School site in 1899. This building later served as a junior high school until it was closed in 1982.

=== Schaefer Stadium ===
The Ottumwa High School football/track stadium, known as Schaefer Stadium, was established in the early 1920s in memory of a past student of OHS. Walter B. Schaefer graduated from the Ottumwa High School in 1903 with athletic records and many college football opportunities. He went to the University of Chicago to play football under the famous coaching of Amos Alonzo Stagg, but Schaefer left college early to fight in the war. Schaefer was killed while serving in 1918. He was considered one of the greatest athletes in Iowa and especially in football, which is why the Ottumwa Stadium is now known as Schaefer Stadium. In 2018, Schaefer Stadium was updated. New bleachers for the home side and a new visitor exit were added.

=== Current building ===
This building served as Ottumwa High School from 1899 to 1923.

To address the growing student population, the Ottumwa Community School District began construction on the current high school building at the same location as the Adams School in 1921. The "new" high school was designed by architects Croft & Boerner of Minneapolis. It was completed in 1923. As part of the construction, the Adams School was lifted from its foundation and moved east—it would serve as a building for vocational classes at the new high school.

Ottumwa High School as it stands today opened on August 29, 1923, to grades 9, 10, 11, and 12. It reportedly cost just over one million dollars to complete.

In the 1970s, an additional building was completed—the "Vo-Tech" building—for vocational and performing arts classes. The facility was connected to the main building via a skywalk accessible from the second floor hallway. This decade also saw the addition of a second gymnasium, often nicknamed the "Rubber Gym" because of its rubber floor, which was built behind the first gymnasium and replaced the Adams School, which was demolished.

=== Building expansions ===
In the 1990s, a city property tax was levied to help fund a multi-million dollar renovation project. The original aim of the project was to renovate the school hallways and some classrooms, add additional basement classrooms, relocate the cafeteria and library to a new area adjacent to the original building and connecting to the Vo-Tech building, renovate and modernize the school's gymnasium facilities (locker and exercise rooms), and remodel the school's auditorium. The project went over budget, and the gymnasium and auditorium phases were scratched. The cafeteria and library projects were successfully completed, along with the basement, classroom, and hallway renovations, by the end of the century. The skywalk formerly connecting the Vo-Tech and main buildings was replaced by the new building.

=== Vision Iowa Grant renovation ===
In spring 2001, the school received a grant for nearly $1 million from Vision Iowa to remodel the auditorium which is where they now hold all of their pep rallies, guest speakers, and drama productions. During this renovation some plaster designs were removed from the original 1921-1923 ceiling and placed glass for viewing near the exits. The auditorium was closed from 2002 to 2003 for renovations. Its grand re-opening took place on November 23, 2003. At the same time, additional renovations to the gymnasium facilities were completed with aid of a federal grant obtained with the help of Iowa Senator Tom Harkin.

=== Renovation and extensions ===
In 2023, the Ottumwa Community School District approved a $30 million expansion and renovation plan for the high school. Expected to be done in two stages, the plan calls for a $10.5 million competition gym that will be across the high school on Second Street, and feature two full-sized basketball courts and three volleyball courts. The remaining $19.5 million will be used on renovating the classrooms in the school, with 20 to 25 classrooms undergoing major renovations.

== Campus ==
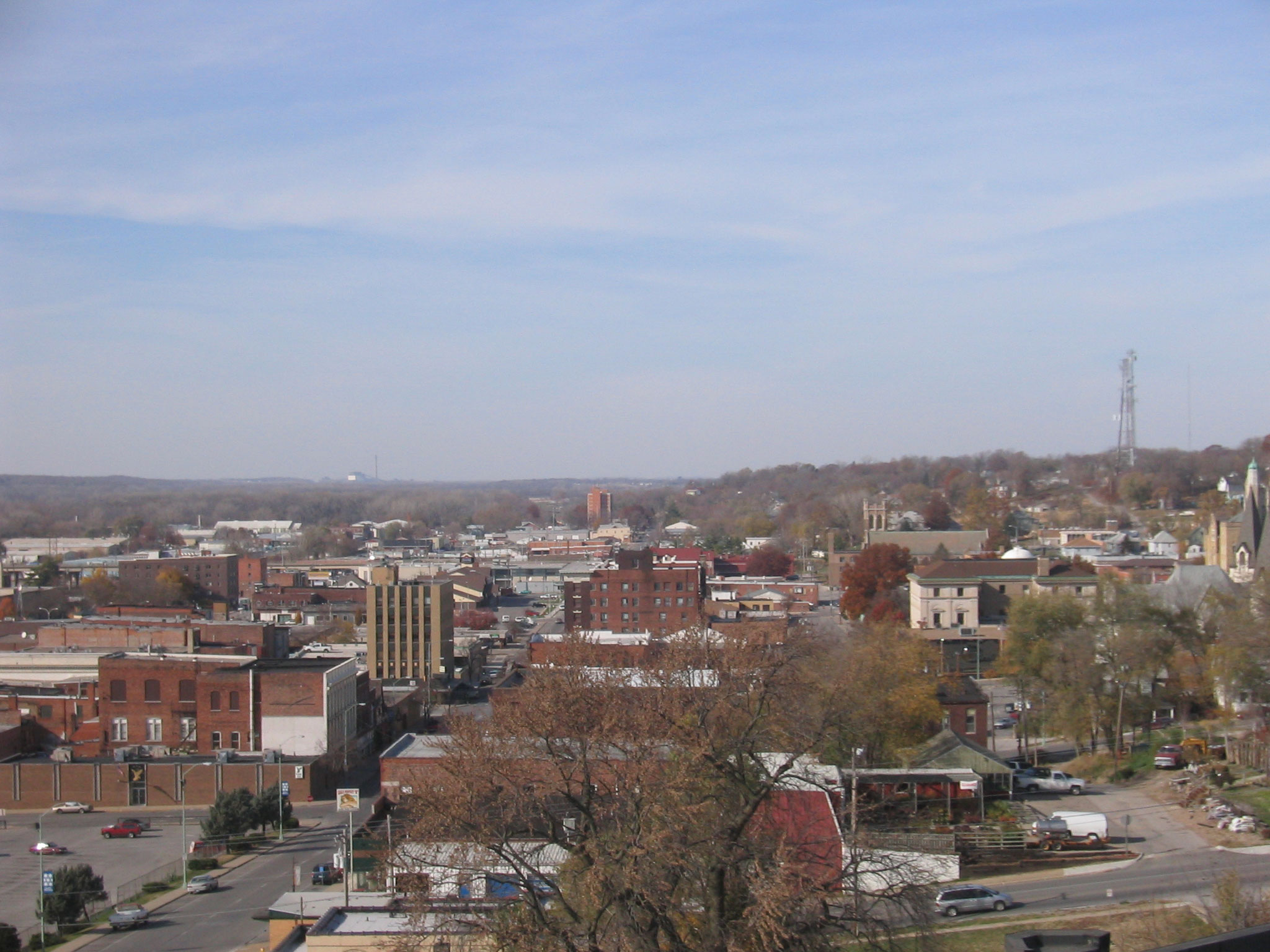
OHS is situated on one of the highest hills in Ottumwa. This view from the roof is a look at downtown Ottumwa.

The main campus of Ottumwa High School consists of a four-story building in downtown Ottumwa. The hill on which the building sits was once the site of Chief Wapello's tribal village. Legend suggests he originally called the area "Ottumwa" from this spot in 1838.

The four floors of the main building can be roughly divided by subject areas: the rooms on the bottom floor contain mostly social studies and foreign language classrooms; the second floor contains several offices, family and consumer science classrooms, and mathematics classrooms; the third floor is mostly mathematics and language arts classrooms; and the fourth floor houses science and language arts classrooms. The school's auditorium and gymnasium are usually accessed from the second floor, though the auditorium and gyms have entrances on the third floor as well.

The Vo-Tech building houses vocational classrooms, a JROTC room, and a fiber optics network room on its first floor. Performing arts classrooms are located on its second floor.

The two buildings are connected by a central cafeteria or commons; this building also houses a second-floor library with approximately 9,000 volumes.

Ottumwa High School does not hold any sporting contests on its campus; instead, the school uses other buildings, public facilities, or the stadium within Ottumwa. Construction of a new gym complex started on 2023 and was scheduled to be done on 2024.

== Faculty awards ==
Hanson, then principal of OHS, was named the 2015 Iowa Secondary Principal of the Year on May 11, 2015, at a school-wide assembly at Ottumwa High School.

In 2001, anatomy/physiology teacher Gail Wortmann was named Iowa Teacher of the Year. She was also awarded the Milken Family Foundation Teacher of the Year award in that year.

From 2000 to 2002, science teacher Peggy Steffen served as an Einstein Fellow for NASA.

== Extracurricular activities ==
Students at Ottumwa High School can participate in many extracurricular activities. In addition to 14 varsity athletic teams (archery, baseball/softball, basketball, bowling, cheerleading, cross-country running, football, golf, swimming, tennis, track and field, volleyball, soccer, trapshoot, dance, and wrestling), OHS offers numerous clubs and other activities such as the JROTC program and Drama, as well band, choirs, and orchestra.

=== Athletics ===
- Baseball - 2-time Class 4A State Champions (1996, 1997)
- Boys' basketball - 5-time State Champions (1912, 1915, 1928, 1942, 1949)
- Girls' bowling - 3-time Class 2A State Champions (2007, 2009, 2012)
- Boys' cross country - 4-time State Champions (1931, 1932, 1933, 1940)
- Football - 1963 State Champions
- Boys' golf - 11-time State Champions (1943, 1944, 1952, 1953, 1987, 1988, 1989, 1991, 1992, 1997, 2009)
- Coed golf - 2-time Class 2A State Champions (2007, 2008)
- Girls' golf - 5-time State Champions (1984, 1985, 1987, 1997, 2007)
- Softball - 2-time State Champions (1976, 1995)
- Wrestling - 1923 State Champions

== Curriculum ==
Ottumwa High School is a four-year comprehensive high school serving 1,300 students in grades 9–12. It is accredited by North Central Association and the State of Iowa Department of Public Instruction. The school year is divided into two semesters of 90 days in length. Class size averages 25 students with seven 50-minute periods.

=== SparkTank ===
SparkTank is a project-based program that began in 2018. It allows students at the Ottumwa High School to gain work experiences by connecting with local businesses to provide a real work environment and a real work experience. The courses that SparkTank offers are engineering and design, building manufacturing, Ignite, communication and technology, building and construction, and school to work classes. Although this course is set up in a different manner than a classroom, students still use teamwork and collaboration to meet project deadlines. Students are working for local businesses, expectations are higher to meet the business’ standard. SparkTank also helps students with their communication skills, technical skills, employability skills, and cooperation skills. SparkTank's ultimate goal is to give students the life lessons they need to find and career goal and find a job after graduation. SparkTank is located at 325 East Main Street, Ottumwa. SparkTank partners with the Governor's Stem Advisory Council, Iowa ALN, and Future Ready Iowa.

== Notable alumni ==
- Tom Arnold – 1977 – actor/philanthropist
- Chris Ash – 1992 – football coach
- Charles H. Dingle — 1942 — politician
- Elnora M. Gilfoyle — occupational therapist; Dean of the College of Applied Human Sciences and Provost/Academic Vice President at Colorado State University
- Donald Keyhoe – 1915 – Marine Corps major and aviator, UFO researcher and author
- Kevin Lewis – 2011 – distance runner
- Herschel C. Loveless – 1927 – Governor of Iowa (1957–1961)
- E. J. Mather – football and basketball player and coach
- Jack E. McCoy – 1946 – Member of the Iowa House of Representatives
- Carol Morris – 1954 – Miss Universe winner in 1956
- Stevan Robinson – 1989 – musician
- Tanner Varner — gridiron football player

== See also ==
- List of high schools in Iowa
