= Quincy Place Mall =

- Location: Ottumwa, Iowa
- Coordinates: 41.01638°N 92.43479°W
- Address: 1110 N. Quincy Ave, Ottumwa, IA 52501
- Opened: 1990
- Developer: Developers Diversified
- Owner: Lexington Realty International
- Num. of stores: ~45
- Num. of anchor tenants: 4 (2 open, 2 vacant)
- Floor area: 270,000 square feet (25,000 m^{2})
- Floors: 1
- Public transit: 10-15 Transit
- Website: thequincyplacemall.com

Quincy Place Mall is a shopping mall located in Ottumwa, Iowa. The mall is managed by Lexington Realty International. The mall's anchor stores are Harbor Freight Tools, Dunham's Sports and Dollar Tree. There are two vacant anchor stores that were once Herberger's and JCPenney.

== History ==
Quincy Place Mall opened in August 1990 as a 270,000 sq ft mall anchored by JCPenney, Herberger's, and Walmart. The opening of the mall also followed the closure and redevelopment of a previous pedestrian mall in downtown Ottumwa. Pat Buchanan visited the mall in 1999 as part of a five-day trip through Iowa.

Walmart closed its store at the mall in 2003, relocating to a freestanding supercenter. Goody's opened in a portion of the former space by 2004.

By 2015, Dollar Tree and MC Sports had moved into a portion of the former Walmart. JCPenney closed at the mall in 2017, bringing to an end 101 years of the retailer being in Ottumwa. MC Sports closed at the mall in 2017, as part of their bankruptcy, and was replaced by Dunham's Sports in 2018. Herberger's closed at the mall in 2018, bringing the mall's occupancy down to just a third. The mall, as of 2019, has gained entertainment tenants including Gamertag and primarily, the Ottumwa Old-School Pinball and Arcade and the Video Game Hall of Fame. Over the past couple years, the mall has also been the home of the Galaxies of Gaming convention; it is run by Walter Day and Twin Galaxies.

In 2022, the remaining unused portion of the old Walmart building was converted into a Harbor Freight Tools.
