= Jay Funeral Home =

Historic building in Wapello County, Iowa, US

- U.S. National Register of Historic Places
- U.S. Historic district – Contributing property
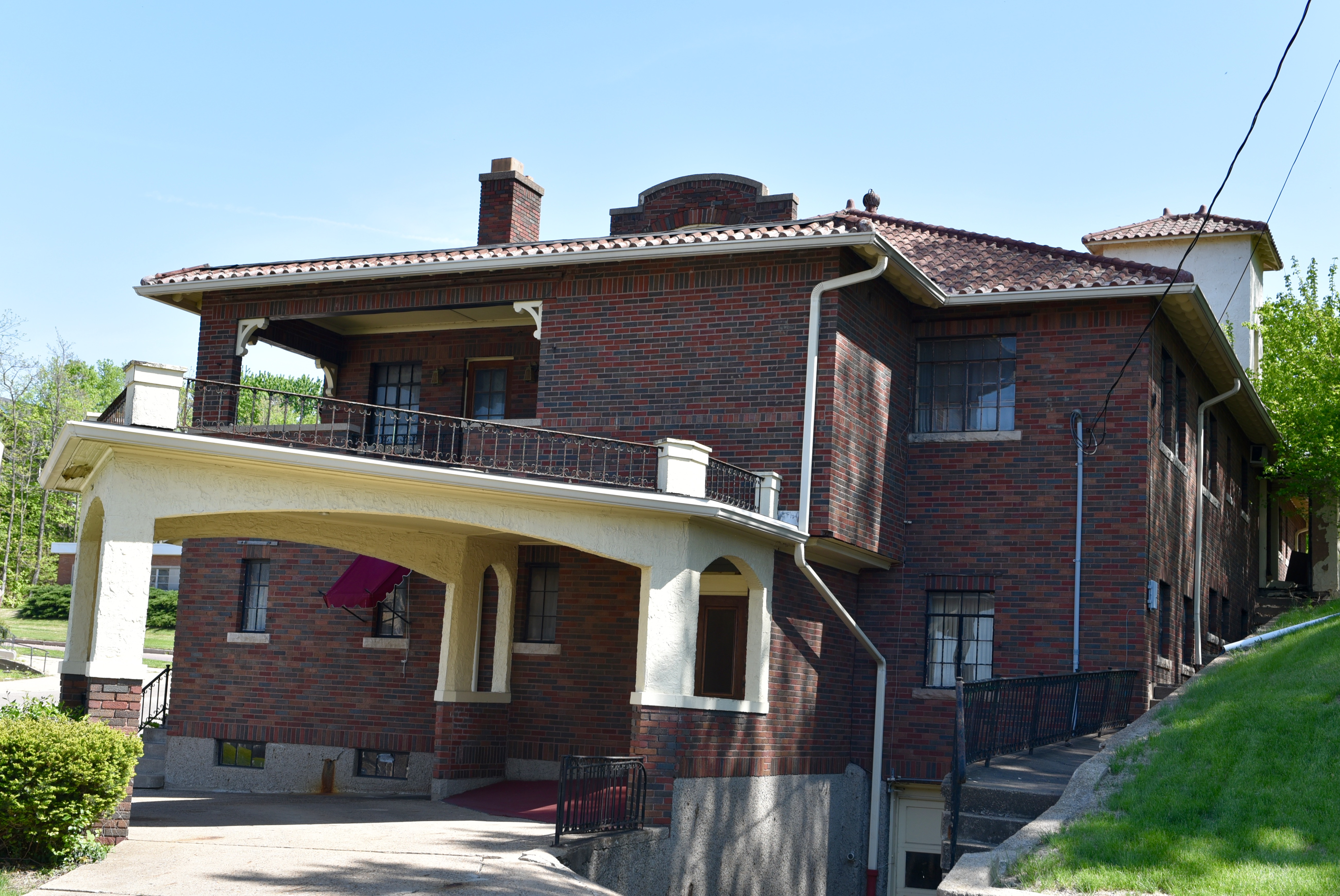

- Location within Iowa Location within the United States
- Location: 220 North Ct. Ottumwa, Iowa
- Coordinates: 41°1′12″N 92°24′35″W
- Area: less than one acre
- Built: 1929
- Architect: Archie Eaton
- Architectural style: Mediterranean Revival
- Part of: Fifth Street Bluff Historic District (ID97001606)
- MPS: Ottumwa MPS
- NRHP reference No.: 95000971
- Added to NRHP: August 11, 1995

Jay Funeral Home, now known as the Robertson-Jay Funeral Home, is an historic building and funeral home located in Ottumwa, Iowa, United States. Local architect Archie Eaton designed the building in the Mediterranean Revival style. The two-story brick structure was completed in 1929. The exterior of the building features round arch windows, a tile roof, and a broad brick porte cochere. The building is noteworthy for its architecture and as an early example of funeral home design. It was individually listed on the National Register of Historic Places in 1995. In 1998 it was included as a contributing property in the Fifth Street Bluff Historic District.
