= Trinity Episcopal Church (Ottumwa, Iowa) =

- U.S. National Register of Historic Places
- U.S. Historic district – Contributing property
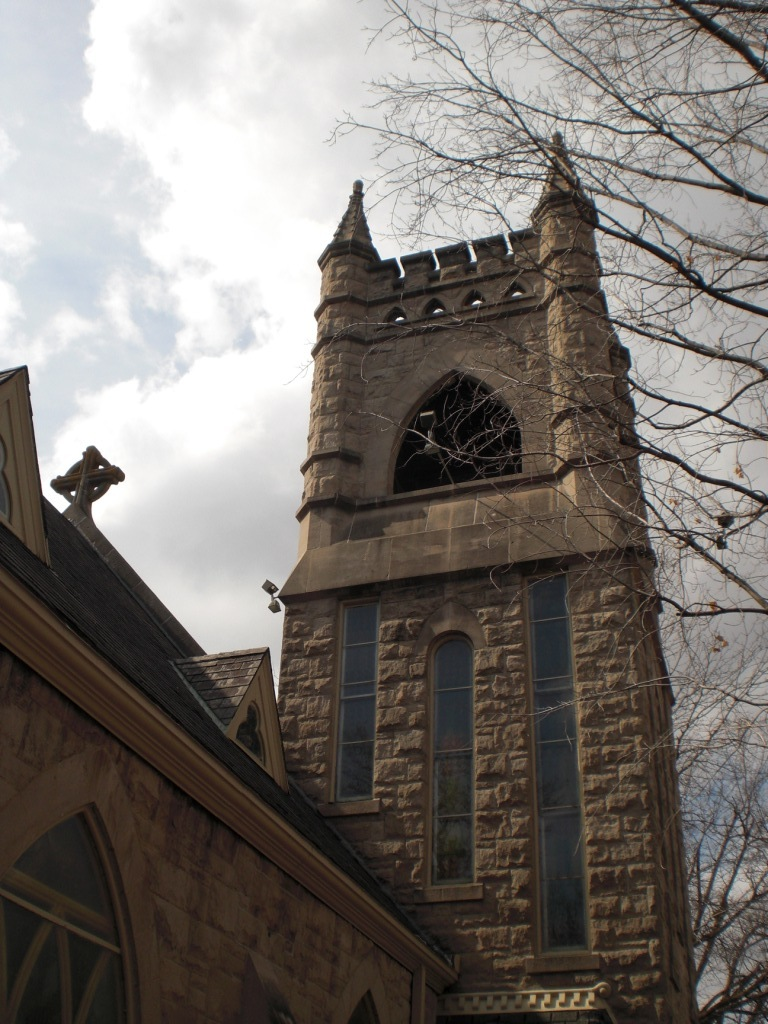

- Location within Iowa Location within the United States
- Location: 204 E. 5th Street; Ottumwa, Iowa
- Coordinates: 41°1′10.7178″N 92°24′29.6892″W
- Area: less than one acre
- Built: 1895
- Architect: Edward Hammatt
- Architectural style: Gothic Revival
- Part of: Fifth Street Bluff Historic District
- NRHP reference No.: 97001606
- Added to NRHP: January 7, 1998

Trinity Episcopal Church is located in Ottumwa, Iowa, United States. It is a parish church of the Episcopal Diocese of Iowa. The building is a contributing property in the Fifth Street Bluff Historic District on the National Register of Historic Places.

In 2017, the church reported 40 members; in 2023, it reported 36 members. No membership statistics were reported in 2024 national parochial reports. Plate and pledge financial support reported by the church in 2024 was $31,288. Average Sunday Attendance (ASA) reported in 2024 was 12 persons. This was a relative decrease from ASA of 25 persons reported in 2015.

== History ==
The parish was established in 1857. The present church building was completed in 1895, and was designed by Davenport architect Edward Hammatt.

== Architecture ==
The Gothic Revival style building is composed of rusticated limestone. A three-story bell tower is on the west end of the building and the apse is on the east. Because the church is built into the side of a hill both the upper and lower levels of the building open onto the ground level. The church features Gothic arch windows and doors throughout. Buttresses are placed between the windows on both sides of the building. It is considered an excellent example of late 19th century Gothic Revival ecclesiastical design.
