= St. Mary of the Visitation Catholic Church (Ottumwa, Iowa) =

St. Mary of the Visitation Church
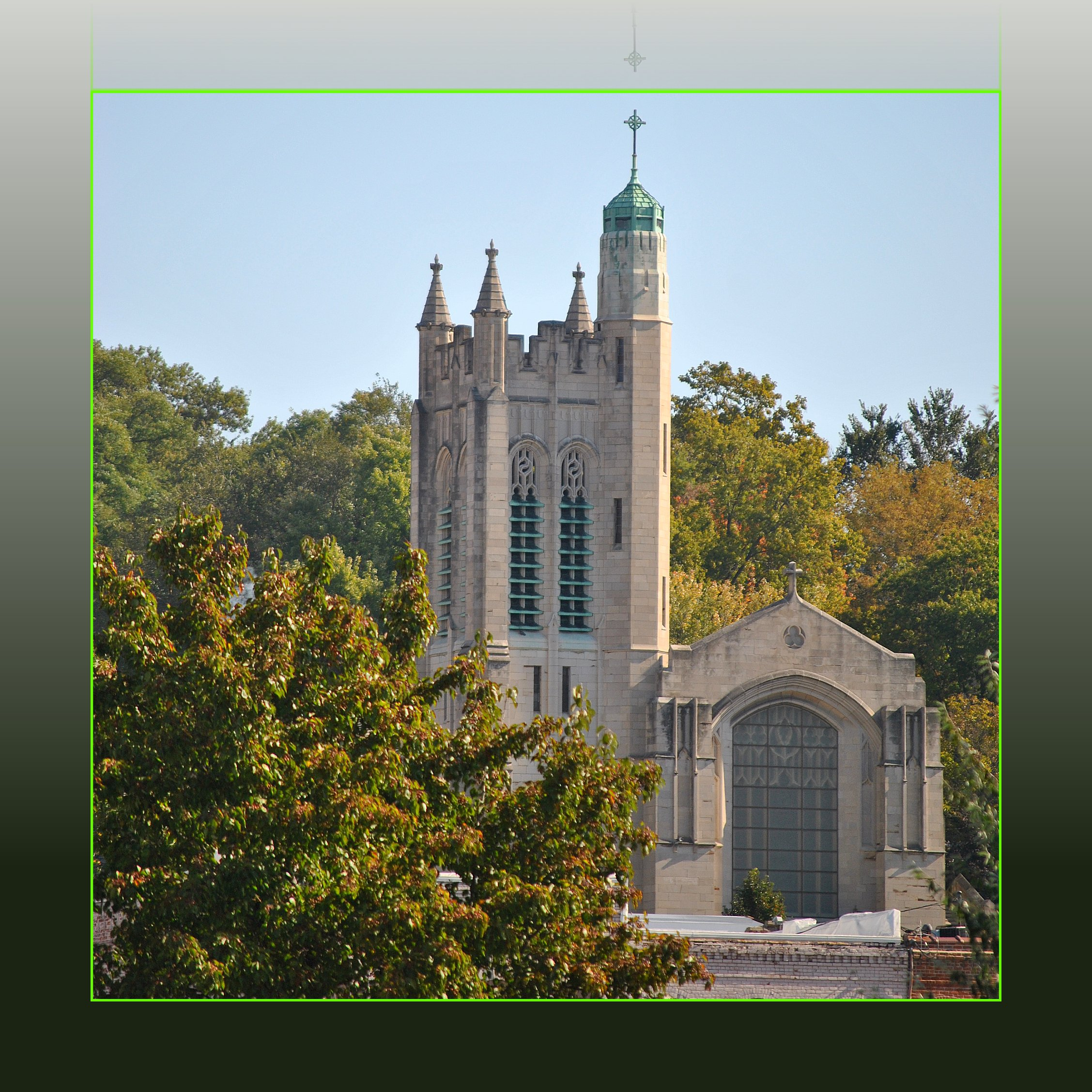

- Location within Iowa Location within the United States
- Interactive map showing the location for St. Mary of the Visitation Church
- 41°01′10″N 92°24′38″W
- Location: 103 E. 4th Street; Ottumwa, Iowa
- Country: United States
- Denomination: Catholic Church

History
- Status: Parish
- Founded: 1849
- Dedication: Visitation
- Dedicated: November 15, 1891

Architecture
- Functional status: Active
- Architect: C.I. Krajewski
- Style: Gothic Revival
- Completed: 1930

Specifications
- Materials: Bedford stone

Administration
- Diocese: Davenport

Clergy
- Bishop: Most Rev. Dennis G. Walsh
- Pastor: Rev. Joseph Sia

St. Mary of the Visitation Catholic Church is a parish of the Diocese of Davenport. The church building is located on the corner of 4th and Court Streets in downtown Ottumwa, Iowa, United States. It is part of the Central Park area, which is the civic center of the community. It includes: the Wapello County Courthouse, the Ottumwa Public Library, and the Ottumwa City Hall. The church is eligible for the National Register of Historic Places, but it has not been listed.

== History ==
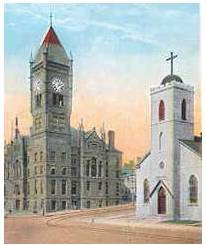
Old St. Mary's Church (right) and the courthouse.

St. Mary of the Visitation Parish was established in 1849 when Bishop Mathias Loras of the Diocese of Dubuque sent the Rev. Jean Villars from St. John the Evangelist in Keokuk to purchase two lots for the church and rectory and a larger piece of land for a cemetery in Louisville, as Ottumwa was known at the time. The price paid for the church property and that for a cemetery was $1,100. He organized the congregation and supervised the building of a small brick church. Rev. Alexander Hattenberger was sent to be pastor of the entire Des Moines Valley in 1850. He was the first priest to celebrate Mass in what would become Des Moines. However, he found the assignment too difficult and in 1853 he was transferred to St. Joseph’s Church in Fort Madison. He was replaced by a newly ordained priest, the Rev. John Kreckel, who stayed in Ottumwa until his death in 1899. Not only was he responsible for Ottumwa and Wapello County, but his territory also covered Jefferson, Van Buren, Keokuk, Mahaska, Polk, Jasper, Marion, Monroe, Davis, Appanoose, Wayne and Decatur Counties. He founded churches in Eddyville, Georgetown, and Bauer.

A new and larger church building was constructed of stone in 1860 on the site of the present church. Two other parishes were established in Ottumwa, which reduced St. Mary’s in size. St. Patrick’s was established on the south side of town in 1879. Both parishes became part of the Diocese of Davenport when it was established in 1881. Ottumwa’s third parish, Sacred Heart, was started on the east side of town in 1897. It closed in the 1990s. The number of Spanish speaking people have moved into the Ottumwa area, and Masses are celebrated in Spanish at St. Mary’s.

== Church building ==
By the 1920s it was determined the church building was too small for the growing congregation, so plans were made to replace it with the current structure. The present St. Mary of the Visitation Church was designed by C.I. Krajewski, an architect from Dubuque, Iowa. He designed the building in the Late Gothic Revival style, which was popular at the time. The building features an asymmetrical facade with a corner bell tower. The exterior is constructed of blocks of Bedford limestone. The tower is crenellated across the top, and features finials on three of the corners and a copper-covered lantern topped by a cross on the fourth.

The main entrance of the church is deeply recessed within a Gothic arched opening. The original wooden doors matched the tympanum area's inset panels above the doors. The doors were replaced to meet fire code. On either side of the front doors is a carved fleur-de-lis, a symbol of purity that is used to represent the Blessed Virgin Mary under whose patronage the church is dedicated.

The interior reveals a traditional Latin Cross floor plan. The long, narrow nave ends in the altar area. Before the altar is the transept wing that forms the cross. Two side aisles flank the main nave and are separated from the nave with Gothic arches. The interior walls are constructed of tannish-brown brick, highlighted by inset carved stone panels. The altar area was simplified following the Second Vatican Council. The ceiling is built on large wooden trusses that hold up ornately painted ceiling panels.

Large stained glass clerestory windows line the walls of the main nave and depict different saints. Narrow windows light the side aisles. All of the windows in the church were created by Emil Frei, Inc. of St. Louis, Missouri. The light fixtures were designed and constructed by the Beardslee Chandelier Company of Chicago, Illinois. A large pipe organ was placed in the church in the 1990s.

== Catholic schools ==
In 1862 the Visitation Sisters established a convent and academy for girls. In 1877 the Congregation of the Humility of Mary started a school for boys in the basement and in one other room of the rectory. In 1890 they purchased the Visitation convent and academy for their motherhouse and were responsible for the education of both the boys and the girls at the parish school. In 1926 St Mary’s added high school grades to the school. In 1935 the three Ottumwa parishes joined to support Central Catholic High School. A new high school building was built in 1954 and the school was renamed Walsh. In 1970 the Catholic people of Ottumwa voted to close Walsh, along with all the parish grade schools in Ottumwa. There was an attempt to raise money to save the schools, but the campaign came up short. In 1975 a new grade school, supported by all three Ottumwa parishes, was opened and named Seton. Classes were held in the St. Mary’s and St. Patrick’s school buildings.
