= Charles H. Dingle =

American politician

Member of the New Hampshire House of Representatives from the Strafford 4th district
- In office 1982–1988

Personal details
- Born: Charles Harlan Dingle; August 31, 1924 Ottumwa, Iowa, U.S.
- Died: June 14, 2024 (aged 99) Exeter, New Hampshire, U.S.
- Party: Republican
- Education: Iowa State University

Charles Harlan Dingle (August 31, 1924 – June 14, 2024) was an American politician. A member of the Republican Party, he served in the New Hampshire House of Representatives from 1982 to 1988.

== Life and career ==
Dingle was born in Ottumwa, Iowa, the son of Moses Dingle and Estella Harlan. He attended Ottumwa High School, graduating in 1942. After graduating, he served in the United States Coast Guard during World War II. After his discharge, he attended Iowa State University, earning his BS degree in engineering in 1950. He moved to Durham, New Hampshire, in 1961.

Dingle served in the New Hampshire House of Representatives from 1982 to 1988.

== Death ==
Dingle died on June 14, 2024, in Exeter, New Hampshire, at the age of 99.
