= Ottumwa Community School District =

Public school district in Ottumwa, Iowa, United States

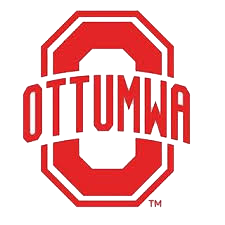

Address
- 115 N Ferry Ottumwa, Iowa, 52501; United States
- Coordinates: 41.002895524238326, -92.43426627528173

District information
- Motto: Inspire every student to think, learn, achieve and care.
- Grades: Pre-K though 12
- Superintendent: Mike McGrory
- Accreditation: Iowa Department of Education
- Budget: $68,414,000 (2020-21)
- NCES District ID: 1922110

Students and staff
- Students: 4990 (2022-23)
- Teachers: 317.44 FTE
- Staff: 417.09 FTE
- Student–teacher ratio: 15.72
- District mascot: Bulldog
- Colors: Red and White

Other information
- Website: https://www.ottumwaschools.com/

Ottumwa Community School District is a public school district serving the U.S. city of Ottumwa, Iowa, as well as the surrounding rural area in Wapello County.

== History ==
In the 1950s, the smaller Dahlonega School District was absorbed into the Ottumwa School District. (Dahlonega School No. 1 was added to the National Register of Historic Places in 2000.)

On July 1, 1991, it absorbed a portion of the former Hedrick Community School District, which was involuntarily dissolved by the State of Iowa.

== List of schools ==
Preschool: (Serves for Pre-K-K students)

- Pickwick Early Childhood Center

Elementary Schools: (Serves Grades K-5, unless otherwise noted)

- Douma Elementary (Grades 1st through 2nd)
- Eisenhower Elementary
- Fahrney Elementary (Grades 3rd through 5th)
- Horace Mann Elementary
- James Elementary
- Wilson Elementary

Middle School: (Serves Grades 6-9)

- Liberty Intermediate (Grades 6th through 7th)
- Evans Junior High (Grades 8th through 9th)

High School: (Serves Grades 10-12)

- Ottumwa High School

Other Schools:

- Wildwood Elementary (Closed to students in 2013) - Currently being leased to Ottumwa Christian School following an arson fire, which damaged their building beyond repair

== See also ==
- List of school districts in Iowa
