= Ottumwa City Hall =

- U.S. Post Office
- U.S. National Register of Historic Places
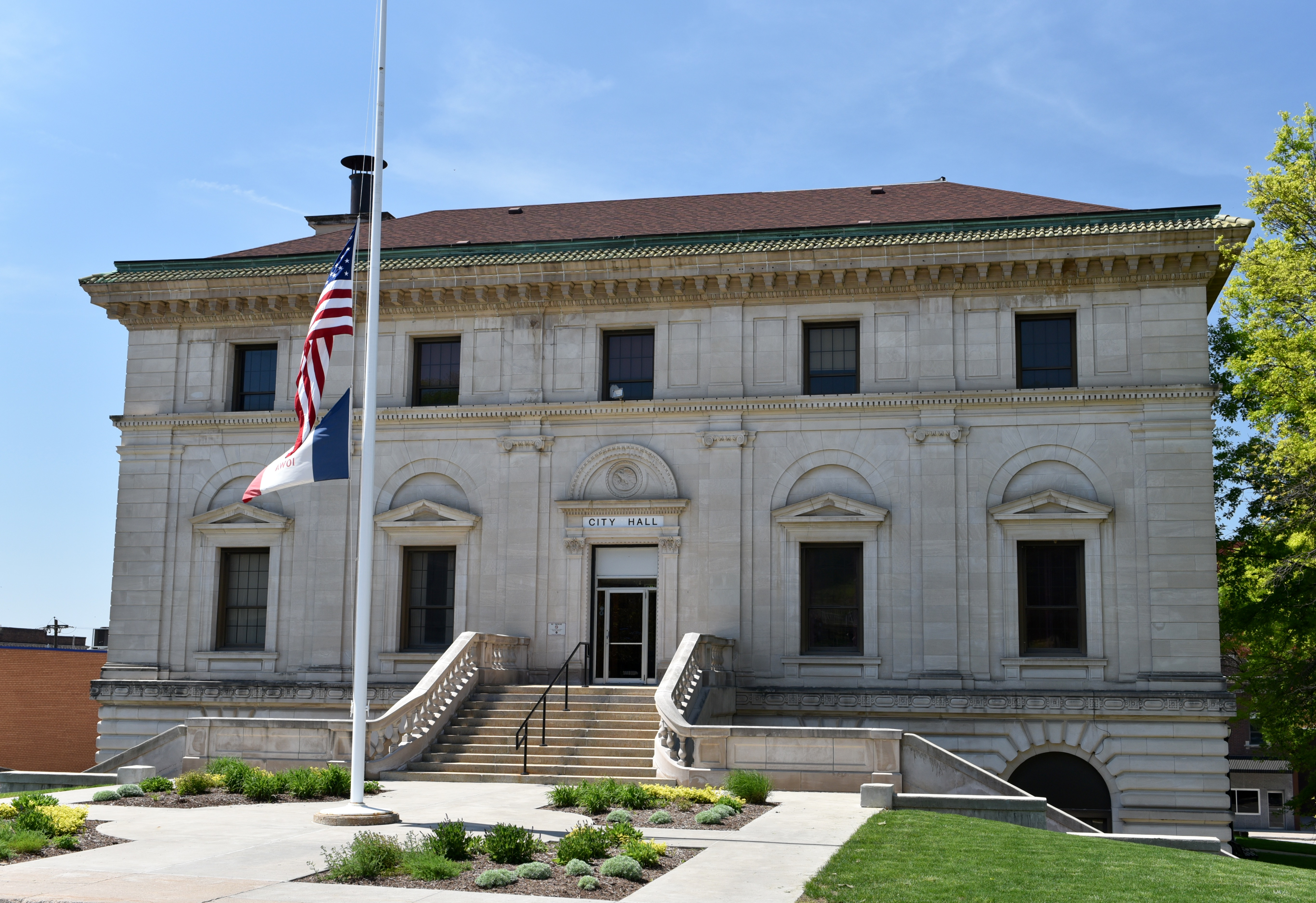

- Location within Iowa Location within the United States
- Interactive map showing the location for Ottumwa City Hall
- Location: Court and Fourth Streets; Ottumwa, Iowa
- Coordinates: 41°1′7″N 92°24′38″W
- Area: less than one acre
- Built: 1910-1912
- Architect: James Knox Taylor
- Architectural style: Renaissance Revival
- NRHP reference No.: 76000810
- Added to NRHP: August 13, 1976

Ottumwa City Hall is the official seat of government for the city of Ottumwa, Iowa, United States. The building originally served as a post office and federal courthouse. It is part of the Central Park area, which includes: Ottumwa Public Library, Wapello County Courthouse and St. Mary of the Visitation Catholic Church. The building was listed on the National Register of Historic Places in 1976.

== History and architecture ==
The Renaissance Revival style building was designed by United States Treasury Department architects under the direction of James Knox Taylor. It replaced a smaller building that was used as the post office on the same site since 1890. The three-story, U-shaped structure was built between 1910 and 1912. It rises to a height of 44 feet (13 m). The exterior is composed of ashlar limestone. In addition to be a fine example of the Renaissance Revival style in Iowa, this is one of the few buildings in Ottumwa clad in stone. The first floor features a limestone facing tooled in horizontal striations and arched windows. Decorative features include stone dentils, paneling, medallions, and Iconic pilasters. The building is capped with a green tile hipped roof.

The building housed the United States Post Office and the United States Courthouse until 1964. The following year the first floor of the building was altered for use by the city as its city hall. Much of the original architectural details remain on the second and third floors. The interior features a white marble staircase with brass handrails. The floors in the corridors on the second and third floors are terrazzo with white marble borders.

== See also ==
- List of United States post offices
