= Fifth Street Bluff Historic District =

Historic district in Iowa, United States

- U.S. National Register of Historic Places
- U.S. Historic district
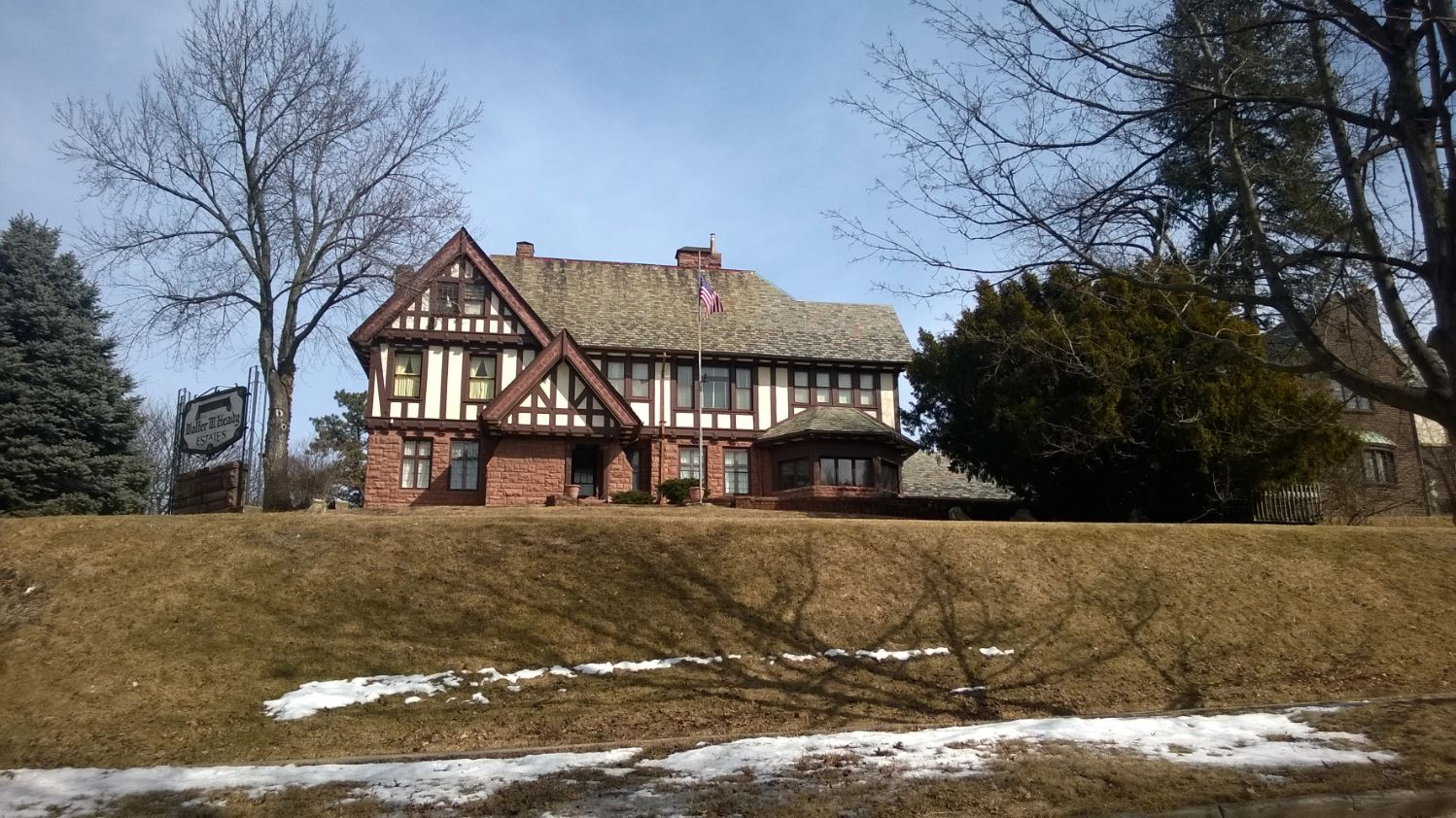

- Location within Iowa Location within the United States
- Location: Roughly bounded by Jefferson, E. 6th, Washington, and 4th Sts. Ottumwa, Iowa
- Coordinates: 41°1′9″N 92°24′26″W
- Area: 23.5 acres (9.5 ha)
- Architect: Edward Hammatt, et al
- Architectural style: Tudor Revival; Italianate; Queen Anne
- MPS: Ottumwa MPS
- NRHP reference No.: 97001606
- Added to NRHP: January 7, 1998

The Fifth Street Bluff Historic District is a nationally recognized historic district located in Ottumwa, Iowa, United States. It was listed on the National Register of Historic Places in 1998. At the time of its nomination it contained 67 resources, which included 40 contributing buildings, three contributing structures, and 24 non-contributing buildings.

== History ==
As Ottumwa grew in the mid to late 19th century many of its wealthier citizens built houses on the bluff overlooking the town and the Des Moines River Valley below. By doing so they were able to move away from the swampy river bottom and were able to capitalize on the view. Construction began in this part of the city in the 1850s. There were, however, three main periods of development: the 1860s, the 1890s, and the 1920s. Prominent citizens who built homes on the bluff included George Morrell of John Morrell & Company, F.W. Simmons of American Mining Tools Company, G.C. Janney of Janney Manufacturing, J.W. Edgerly who was a wholesale druggist, J.H. Merrill who was a wholesale grocer and Judge H.B. Hendershott. Construction in the area was largely concluded by 1930. Italianate, Queen Anne, and Tudor Revival are the most popular architectural styles that are found in the district. In 1895 the streets were paved with bricks and lined with limestone.

== Architecture ==
Because of its location along a bluff, the area is primarily residential and has had little in the way of commercial development. It contains some of the best examples of several architectural styles in the city, and the largest concentration of architect-designed houses and buildings. Nine different architects contributed designs to the district including Ottumwa architect George M. Kerns, New York City architect F.R. Comstock, Davenport architect Edward Hammatt, and the Omaha architectural firm of Fisher & Lowrie. Historic churches in the district include First Baptist and Trinity Episcopal. The contributing structures include the brick streets, stone retaining walls, and an iron fence. The Foster/Bell House and the Jay Funeral Home are individually listed on the National Register of Historic Places.
