= Ottumwa, Iowa =

- City
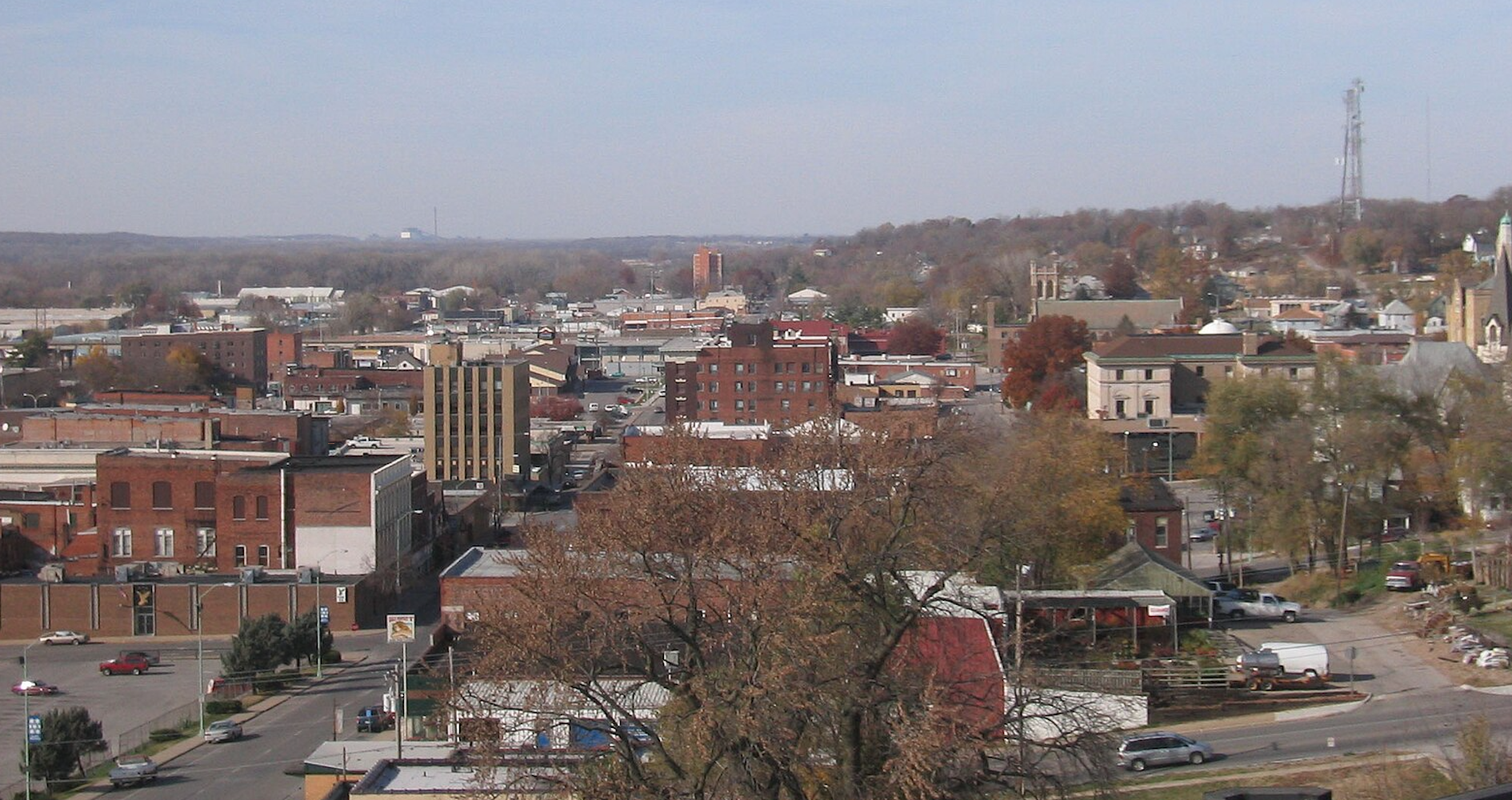
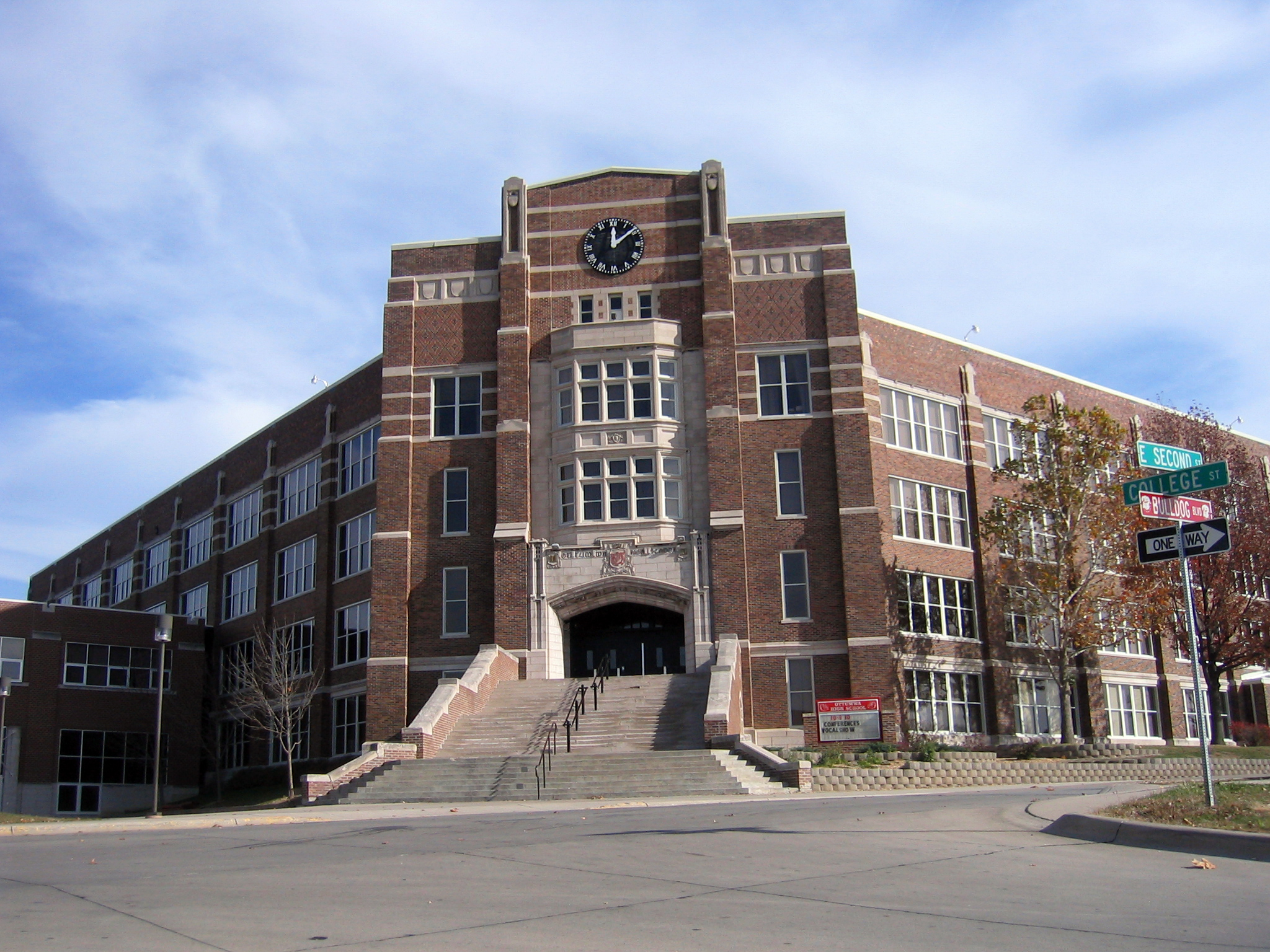
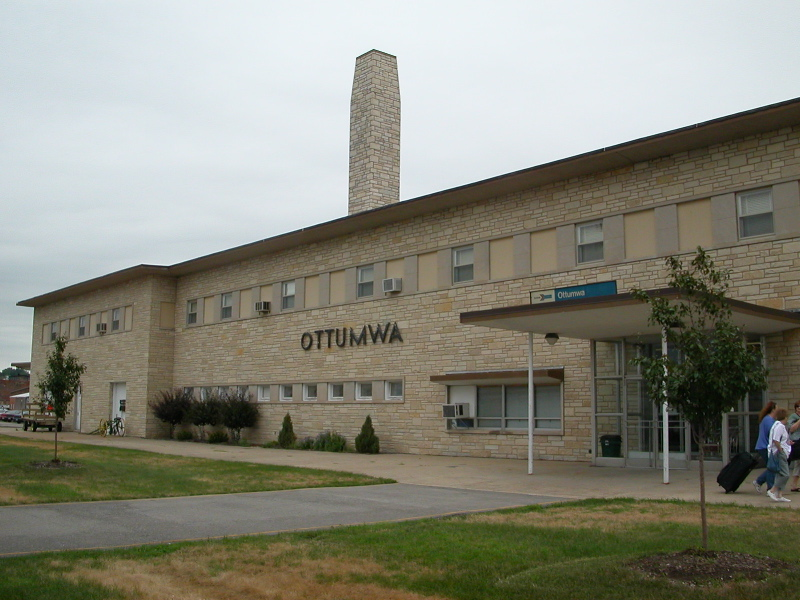
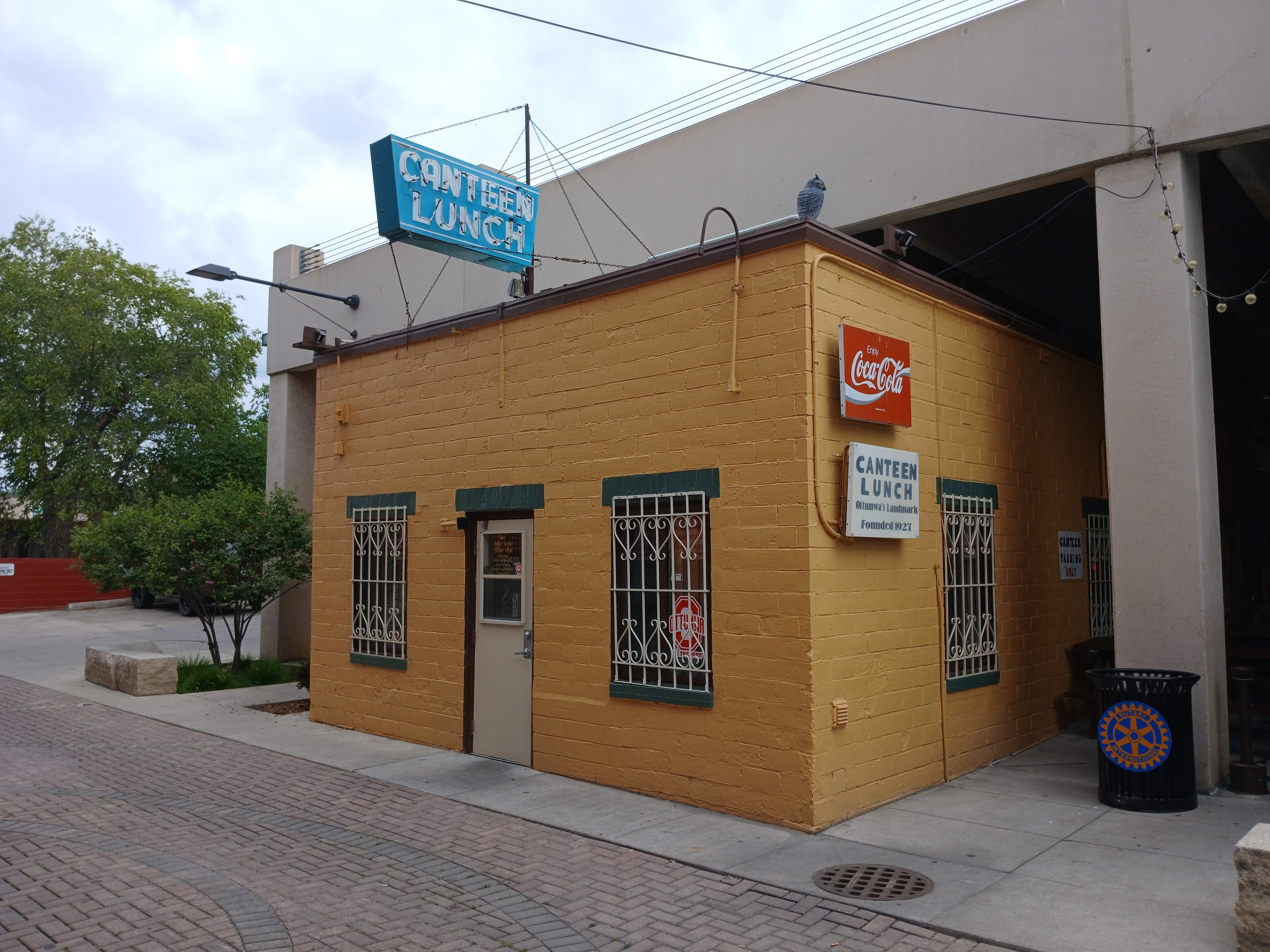
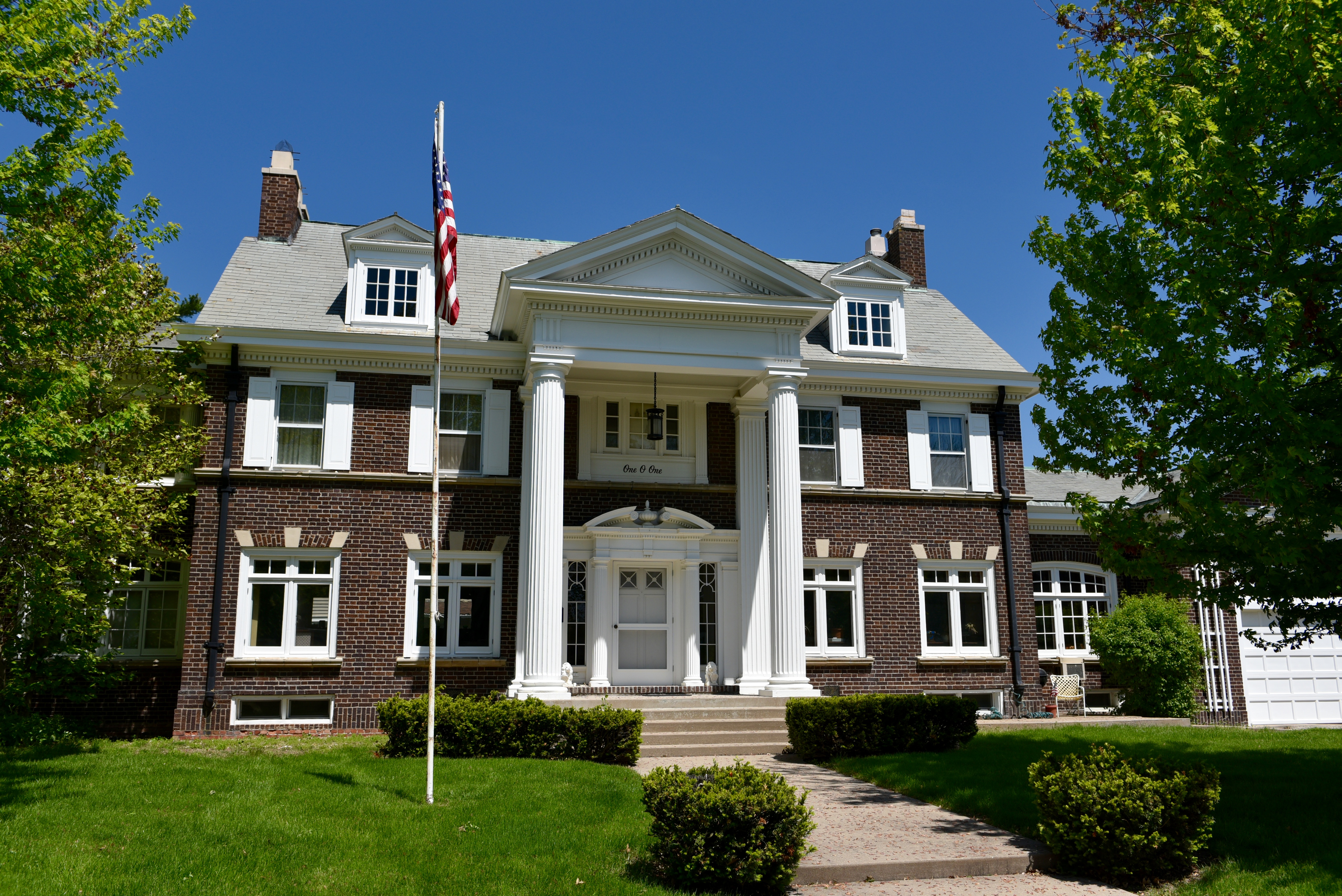
- Downtown Ottumwa Ottumwa High School Ottumwa Amtrak Station Canteen Lunch in the Alley Vogel Place Historic District

- Logo
- Nicknames: City of Bridges; Video Game Capital of the World
- Location of Ottumwa in the State of Iowa
- Coordinates: 41°01′10″N 92°25′07″W
- Country: United States
- State: Iowa
- County: Wapello
- Established: 1843

Government
  - Type: Mayor/Council
  - Mayor: Rick Johnson

Area
  - Total: 16.73 sq mi (43.32 km^{2})
  - Land: 16.06 sq mi (41.60 km^{2})
  - Water: 0.67 sq mi (1.73 km^{2})
- Elevation: 650 ft (200 m)

Population (2020)
  - Total: 25,529
  - Rank: 18th in Iowa
  - Density: 1,589.5/sq mi (613.71/km^{2})
- Time zone: UTC−6 (Central)
  - Summer (DST): UTC−5 (CDT)
- ZIP Code: 52501
- Area code: 641
- FIPS code: 19-60465
- GNIS feature ID: 2396110
- Website: ottumwa.us

Ottumwa (/əˈtʌmwə/ ə-TUM-wə) is a city in and the county seat of Wapello County, Iowa, United States. The population was 25,529 at the time of the 2020 U.S. census. Located in the state's southeastern section, the city is split into northern and southern halves by the Des Moines River.

The original town was founded on the former camps of Meskwaki Chiefs Wapello and Appanoose. Ottumwa first developed as an industrious city economically based in farm-equipment manufacturing and meatpacking, those being John Deere and John Morrell & Co. (now JBS) respectively. The city is also home to Indian Hills Community College to provide for higher education. Ottumwa is the center of the Ottumwa Micropolitan Area which includes all of Wapello and Davis counties.

== History ==
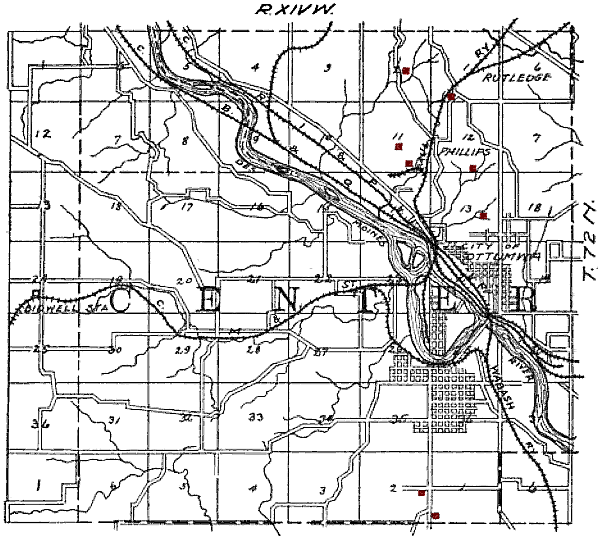
Map of Ottumwa from 1908, showing the railroads and coal mines (red) of the region

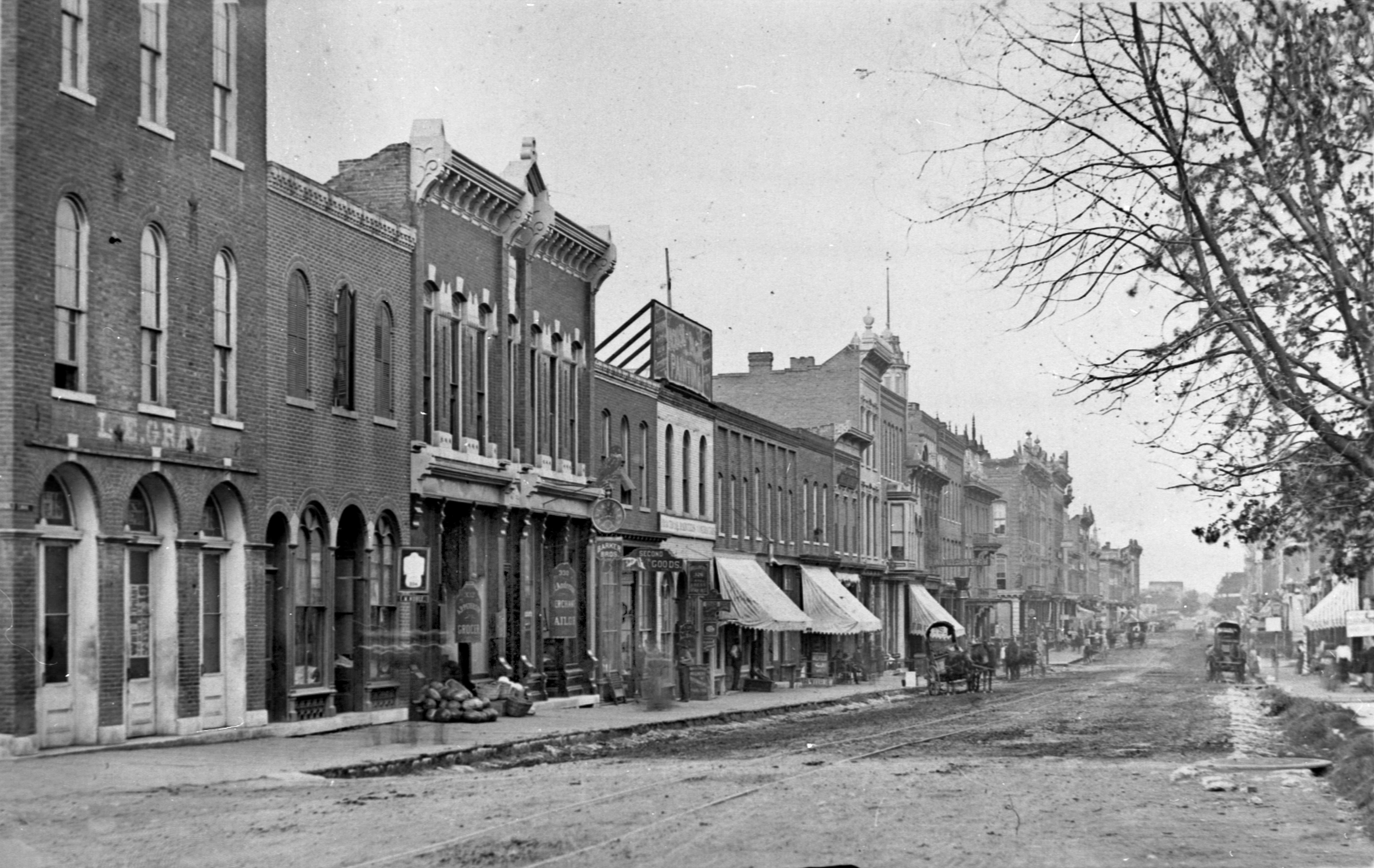
East 300 block of Main Street, 1900

The city's name derives from Fox, an Algonquian language of the native Meskwaki people, translating to 'tumbling waters' in reference to the Appanoose Rapids on the Des Moines River.

In May 1843, several investors formed the Appanoose Rapids Company and staked claim to 467 acres (189 ha) of land in the present site of Ottumwa. Their colonization involved claiming land supporting three indigenous settlements. The first official cabin was built in May 1843 after the area was opened to settlement (an earlier cabin built in defiance of this date was destroyed by Army troops at that time). The original platt was titled Louis Ville. In 1844, the city was named as the county seat.

The town was severely damaged during the flood of 1851.

In 1857, coal was being mined from the McCready bank, a site along Bear Creek four miles (6.4 km) west of Ottumwa. In 1868, Brown and Godfrey opened a drift mine four miles northwest of town. By 1872, Brown and Godfrey employed 300 men and had an annual production of 77,000 tons. In 1880, the Phillips Coal and Mining Company opened a mine two miles (3.2 km) northwest of town. In subsequent years, they opened 5 more shafts in the Phillips and Rutledge neighborhoods, just north of Ottumwa. The Phillips number 5 shaft was 140 feet (43 meters) deep, with a 375 hp (280 kW) steam hoist. By 1889, the state mine inspector's report listed 15 mine shafts in Ottumwa. In 1914, the Phillips Fuel Company produced over 100,000 tons of coal, ranking among the top 24 coal producers in the state. Coal mining was so important to the local economy that, from 1890 to 1892, the Coal Palace was erected in Ottumwa as an exhibition center.

John Morrell & Company and their meat packing comples played a significant role in the development of Ottumwa from 1877 to 1973.

When the Burlington and Missouri River Railroad arrived in Ottumwa in September 1859, it ran parallel to the river channel. The availability of rail transportation encouraged both commercial and industrial expansion along the northwest to southeast axis. Access to the south bank of the river at first was by ferry from the foot of Green Street. By 1875, this ferry had been replaced by a bridge, and a number of additions had been made to the city during the first thirty years, all located on the north side of the Des Moines River. As development (almost exclusively residential) climbed the bluffs, the streets on top of the hills were laid out to compass points, rather than parallel to the river. Although there was some development on the south side of the river, South Ottumwa was not brought into the city limits until the 1880s.

In October 2026, the city made international headlines. During a city council meeting, former city councillor Matt Dalbey opened the meeting with a Satanic invocation.

=== Presidential visits ===
Visits by a sitting U.S. president include:

- Benjamin Harrison in 1890; toured the Coal Palace and spoke to a crowd of over 40,000.
- Theodore Roosevelt in 1903; made a brief train stop while travelling the United States.
- Harry Truman in 1950; while on a 16-state train trip in support of his Fair Deal.
- Richard Nixon in 1971; arrived in Air Force One at the Ottumwa Industrial Airport to dedicate the nearby Rathbun Lake dam and reservoir. Nixon had been stationed at the Ottumwa airport while serving in the U.S. Navy during World War II.
- Barack Obama in 2010; spoke at Indian Hills Community College.

== Geography ==
According to the United States Census Bureau, the city has a total area of 16.53 square miles (42.81 km^{2}), of which 15.86 square miles (41.08 km^{2}) is land and 0.67 square miles (1.74 km^{2}) is water.

Northeastern Wapello County contains large deposits of coal, and there are also large deposits of clay in the region, which played an important role in the industrial development of Ottumwa.

Ottumwa is the center of the Ottumwa Micropolitan Statistical Area which includes all of Wapello County.

=== Climate ===
According to the Köppen Climate Classification system, Ottumwa has a hot-summer humid continental climate, abbreviated "Dfa" on climate maps.

Climate data for Ottumwa Regional Airport, Iowa (1991–2020 normals, extremes 1948–present)
Month	Jan	Feb	Mar	Apr	May	Jun	Jul	Aug	Sep	Oct	Nov	Dec	Year
Record high °F (°C)	71 (22)	79 (26)	88 (31)	91 (33)	97 (36)	103 (39)	106 (41)	105 (41)	100 (38)	93 (34)	79 (26)	75 (24)	106 (41)
Mean maximum °F (°C)	54.8 (12.7)	59.0 (15.0)	73.2 (22.9)	83.0 (28.3)	87.9 (31.1)	92.2 (33.4)	94.9 (34.9)	94.4 (34.7)	90.6 (32.6)	83.5 (28.6)	70.4 (21.3)	58.6 (14.8)	96.8 (36.0)
Mean daily maximum °F (°C)	32.0 (0.0)	36.8 (2.7)	50.2 (10.1)	62.8 (17.1)	72.9 (22.7)	82.2 (27.9)	85.7 (29.8)	84.0 (28.9)	77.3 (25.2)	64.2 (17.9)	49.7 (9.8)	37.2 (2.9)	61.3 (16.3)
Daily mean °F (°C)	22.9 (−5.1)	27.4 (−2.6)	39.6 (4.2)	51.1 (10.6)	62.0 (16.7)	71.6 (22.0)	75.1 (23.9)	73.0 (22.8)	65.3 (18.5)	52.9 (11.6)	39.6 (4.2)	28.4 (−2.0)	50.7 (10.4)
Mean daily minimum °F (°C)	13.8 (−10.1)	18.0 (−7.8)	28.9 (−1.7)	39.4 (4.1)	51.0 (10.6)	61.0 (16.1)	64.5 (18.1)	62.0 (16.7)	53.3 (11.8)	41.6 (5.3)	29.5 (−1.4)	19.7 (−6.8)	40.2 (4.6)
Mean minimum °F (°C)	−7.9 (−22.2)	−2.3 (−19.1)	8.0 (−13.3)	23.5 (−4.7)	36.4 (2.4)	48.7 (9.3)	55.0 (12.8)	52.0 (11.1)	38.1 (3.4)	24.9 (−3.9)	12.2 (−11.0)	−1.1 (−18.4)	−11.9 (−24.4)
Record low °F (°C)	−23 (−31)	−27 (−33)	−20 (−29)	9 (−13)	24 (−4)	41 (5)	48 (9)	41 (5)	27 (−3)	17 (−8)	−9 (−23)	−21 (−29)	−27 (−33)
Average precipitation inches (mm)	1.01 (26)	1.41 (36)	2.24 (57)	3.75 (95)	5.03 (128)	5.38 (137)	3.87 (98)	4.44 (113)	3.50 (89)	2.81 (71)	2.09 (53)	1.44 (37)	36.97 (939)
Average snowfall inches (cm)	7.1 (18)	5.8 (15)	3.0 (7.6)	1.4 (3.6)	0.0 (0.0)	0.0 (0.0)	0.0 (0.0)	0.0 (0.0)	0.0 (0.0)	0.5 (1.3)	1.6 (4.1)	4.2 (11)	23.6 (60)
Average precipitation days (≥ 0.01 in)	7.1	7.4	9.6	11.7	13.1	11.3	9.1	9.2	7.9	8.5	7.5	6.9	109.3
Average snowy days (≥ 0.1 in)	5.7	3.9	2.1	0.8	0.0	0.0	0.0	0.0	0.0	0.4	1.2	3.0	17.1
Source: NOAA

== Demographics ==
Historical population
Census	Pop.	Note	%±
1860	1,632		—
1870	5,214		219.5%
1880	9,004		72.7%
1890	14,001		55.5%
1900	18,197		30.0%
1910	22,012		21.0%
1920	23,003		4.5%
1930	28,075		22.0%
1940	31,570		12.4%
1950	33,631		6.5%
1960	33,871		0.7%
1970	29,610		−12.6%
1980	27,381		−7.5%
1990	24,488		−10.6%
2000	24,998		2.1%
2010	25,023		0.1%
2020	25,529		2.0%
US Decennial Census

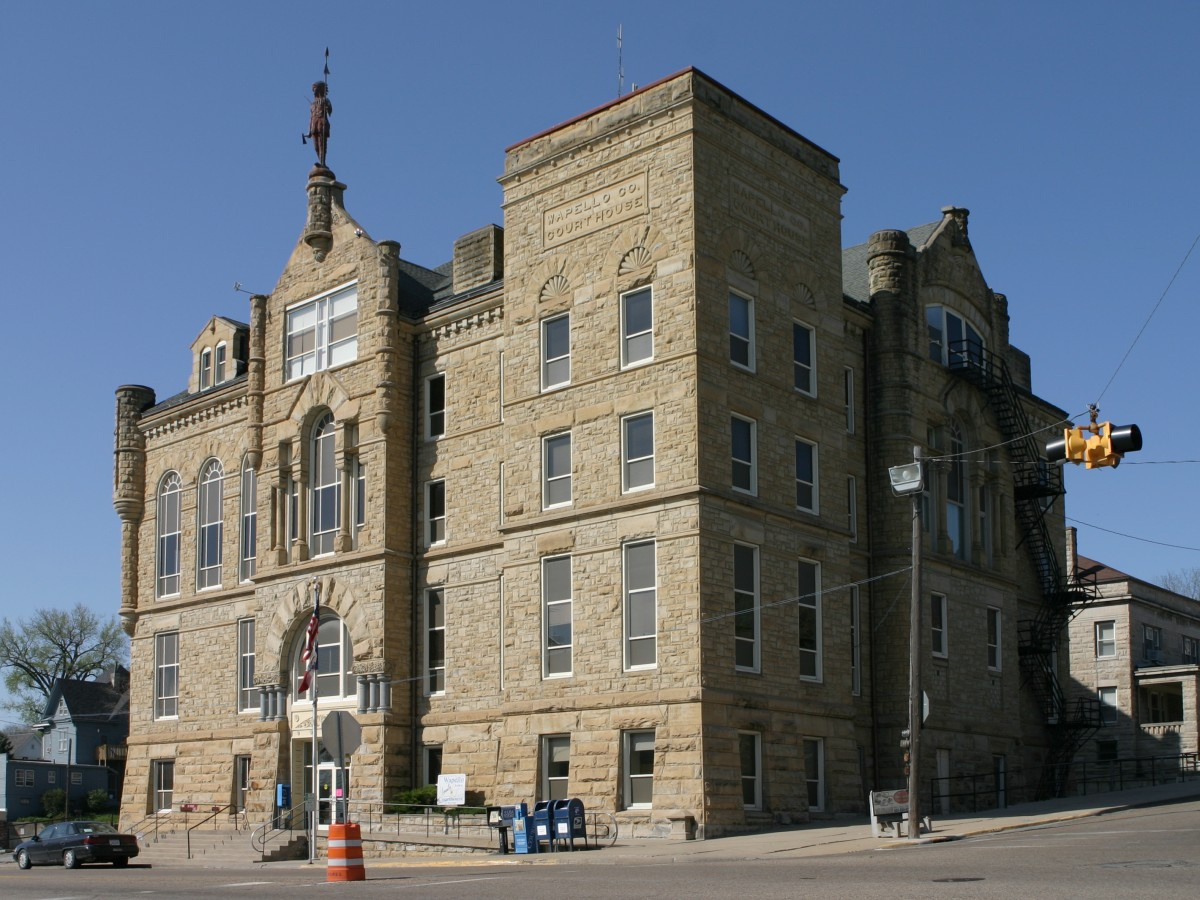
Wapello County Courthouse

=== 2020 census ===
As of the 2020 census, Ottumwa had a population of 25,529, with 10,098 households and 6,048 families. The population density was 1,589.5 inhabitants per square mile (613.7/km^{2}). There were 11,254 housing units at an average density of 700.7 per square mile (270.5/km^{2}); 10.3% were vacant, with a homeowner vacancy rate of 2.3% and a rental vacancy rate of 11.5%.

Of all households, 30.8% had children under the age of 18 living in them; 39.6% were married-couple households and 8.5% were cohabitating couples. Households with a female householder and no spouse or partner present accounted for 30.6%, while 21.4% had a male householder with no spouse or partner present; 40.1% were non-families. About 33.1% of all households were made up of individuals, and 14.8% had someone living alone who was 65 years of age or older.

The median age was 36.7 years. Residents under the age of 20 made up 27.9% of the population (including 24.7% under age 18); 6.3% were between 20 and 24; 26.0% were from 25 to 44; 22.9% were from 45 to 64; and 17.0% were 65 or older. For every 100 females there were 97.9 males, and for every 100 females age 18 and over there were 95.0 males age 18 and over; the gender makeup was 49.5% male and 50.5% female.

Overall, 97.7% of residents lived in urban areas, while 2.3% lived in rural areas.

Racial composition as of the 2020 census
Race	Number	Percent
White	18,966	74.3%
Black or African American	1,371	5.4%
American Indian and Alaska Native	205	0.8%
Asian	576	2.3%
Native Hawaiian and Other Pacific Islander	504	2.0%
Some other race	2,197	8.6%
Two or more races	1,710	6.7%
Hispanic or Latino (of any race)	4,013	15.7%

=== 2010 census ===
As of the 2010 United States census, there were 25,023 people, 10,251 households, and 6,208 families in the city. The population density was 1,577.7 inhabitants per square mile (609.2/km^{2}). There were 11,257 housing units at an average density of 709.8 per square mile (274.1/km^{2}). The racial makeup of the city was 90.2% White, 4.06% Hispanic or Latino, 1.6% African American, 0.6% Native American, 0.9% Asian, 0.2% Pacific Islander, 4.5% from other races, and 1.8% from two or more races.

There were 10,251 households, of which 30.0% had children under the age of 18 living with them, 42.1% were married couples living together, 12.9% had a female householder with no husband present, 5.6% had a male householder with no wife present, and 39.4% were non-families. 32.9% of all households were made up of individuals, and 14.2% had someone living alone who was 65 years of age or older. The average household size was 2.36 and the average family size was 2.97.

The median age in the city was 37.4 years. 23.3% of residents were under the age of 18; 10.8% were between the ages of 18 and 24; 24.8% were from 25 to 44; 25% were from 45 to 64; and 16% were 65 years of age or older. The gender makeup of the city was 48.4% male and 51.6% female.

=== 2000 census ===
As of the 2000 United States census, there were 24,998 people, 10,383 households, and 6,530 families residing in the city. The population density was 1,582.2 inhabitants per square mile (610.9/km^{2}). There were 11,038 housing units at an average density of 698.6 per square mile (269.7/km^{2}). The racial makeup of the city was 95.33% White, 1.27% African American, 0.33% Native American, 0.78% Asian, 0.02% Pacific Islander, 1.38% from other races, and 0.89% from two or more races. Hispanic or Latino of any race were 2.76% of the population.

There were 10,383 households, out of which 28.1% had children under the age of 18 living with them, 47.8% were married couples living together, 11.3% had a female householder with no husband present, and 37.1% were non-families. 31.1% of all households were made up of individuals, and 14.8% had someone living alone who was 65 years of age or older. The average household size was 2.31 and the average family size was 2.88.

Age spread: 22.9% under the age of 18, 10.9% from 18 to 24, 26.1% from 25 to 44, 21.2% from 45 to 64, and 19.0% who were 65 years of age or older. The median age was 38 years. For every 100 females, there were 92.8 males. For every 100 females age 18 and over, there were 88.6 males.

The median income for a household in the city was $30,174, and the median income for a family was $37,302. Males had a median income of $31,222 versus $20,934 for females. The per capita income for the city was $16,040. About 10.9% of families and 15.2% of the population were below the poverty line, including 21.3% of those under age 18 and 8.2% of those age 65 or over.

== Economy ==
=== Top employers ===
According to Ottumwa's 2023 Annual Comprehensive Financial Report, the top employers in the city were:

#	Employer	# of Employees
1	JBS Live Pork, LLC (subsidiary of JBS USA)	2,550
2	Ottumwa Community School District	800
3	Ottumwa Regional Health Center	692
4	John Deere Ottumwa Works	550
5	Winger Companies	449
6	Indian Hills Community College	369
7	Hy-Vee	350
8	Walmart Supercenter	301
9	City of Ottumwa	224
10	Keurig Dr Pepper	200

The Quincy Place Mall is a shopping mall in Ottumwa.

== Arts and culture ==
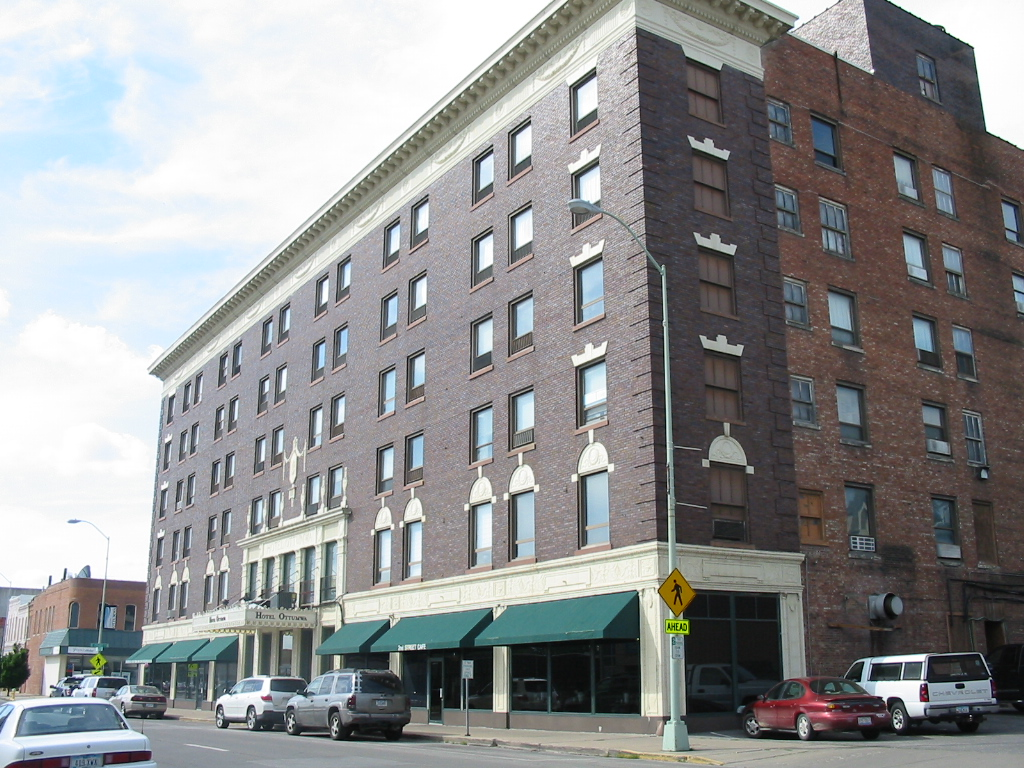
Hotel Ottumwa

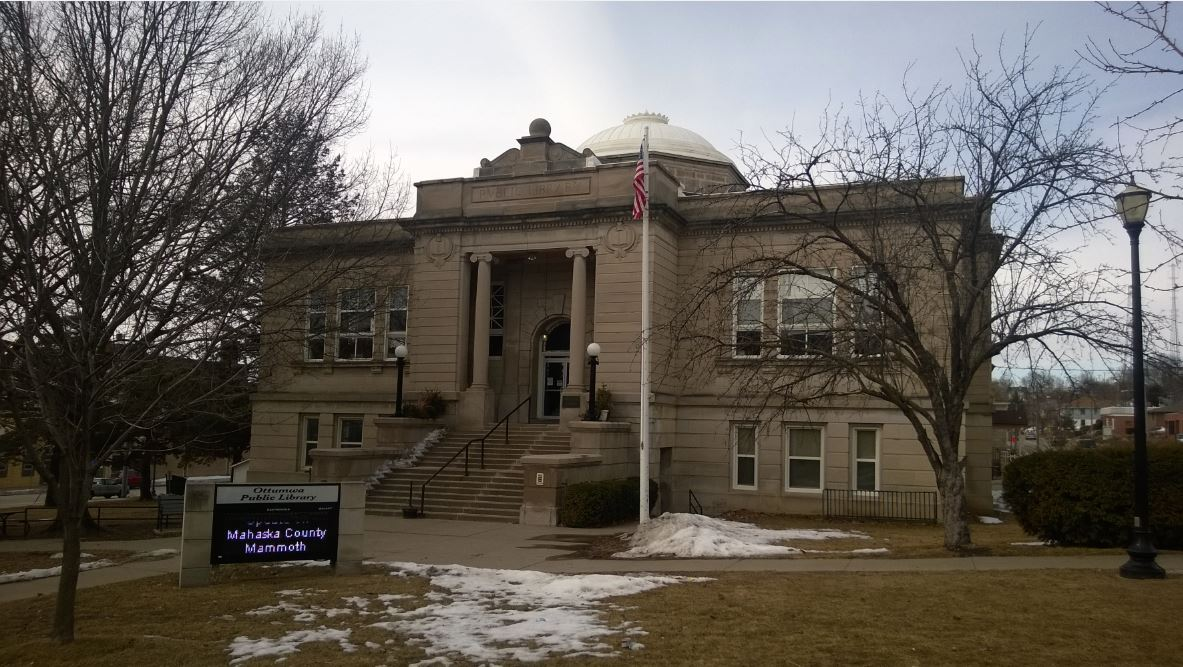
Ottumwa Public Carnegie Library

=== Historic districts ===
- Historic Railroad District
- Fifth Street Bluff Historic District
- Ottumwa Cemetery
- Court Hill Historic District
- Vogel Place Historic District
- North Fellows Historic District

=== Historic structures ===
- B'nai Jacob Synagogue
- Benson Block
- Benson Building 1930
- First National Bank Building 1915
- Foster/Bell House
- Hofmann Building
- Hotel Ottumwa
- J.W. Garner Building
- Jay Funeral Home
- Jefferson Street Viaduct
- Burlington Depot
- Ottumwa City Hall
- Ottumwa Public Library
- Ottumwa Young Women's Christian Association
- St. Mary of the Visitation Catholic Church
- Trinity Episcopal Church
- Wapello County Courthouse

=== Video games ===
Twin Galaxies, was an arcade that opened in Ottumwa on November 10, 1981. The arcade would gain worldwide fame and notoriety for hosting its “Twin Galaxies’ International Video Game Scoreboard,” which accepted and kept track of high scores for video arcade games from around the world.

Due to its growing notoriety as the epicenter of video game high-score tracking, Ottumwa’s then-mayor, Jerry Parker, proclaimed the city the “Video Game Capital of the World” in 1982, a designation that was recognized by U.S. Senator Charles Grassley. The moment was commemorated in the November issue of Life magazine. Later that year, Twin Galaxies hosted the first North American Video Olympics.

Walter Day would eventually leave the arcade side of Twin Galaxies, and the arcade would close its doors on March 6, 1984. The International Scoreboard remains active today as a social media platform.

In 2009, the International Video Game Hall of Fame was established in Ottumwa. Since its establishment, the Hall of Fame has inducted several individuals who have made significant contributions to the video game industry.

Currently, the Hall of Fame has no permanent location, but it has continued to hold induction ceremonies in Ottumwa.

== Education ==
=== Public School System ===
The city of Ottumwa and the surrounding rural areas of Wapello County are served by the Ottumwa Community School District.

Ottumwa is served by Ottumwa High School, Evans Junior High, and multiple neighborhood elementary schools including Douma and Liberty on the Southern side of the city, and James, Horace Mann, Wilson, Eisenhower, and Fahrney Elementary serving the Northern side.

=== Higher education ===
Ottumwa is the home of Indian Hills Community College, a two-year community college. Between 1928 and 1980, it was also home to Ottumwa Heights College, a women's college that merged with Indian Hills in 1979 to create one institution. Indian Hills is located at the former Ottumwa Heights campus. Buena Vista University has a regional campus located here.

== Media ==
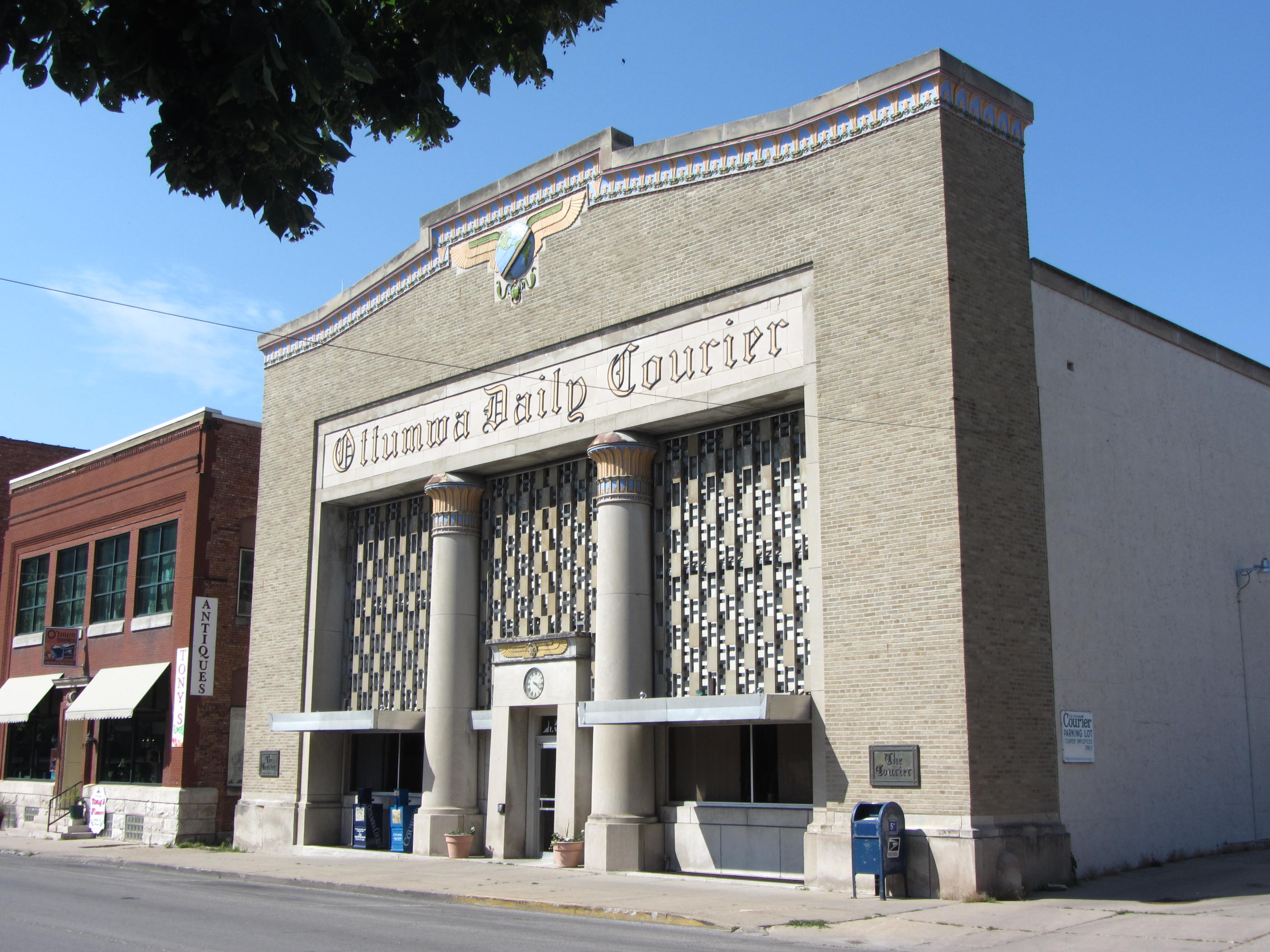
Ottumwa Courier Building

Paired with Kirksville, Missouri, Ottumwa is a media market region, ranked #201 by Nielsen. Television stations include Fox/NBC/The CW+ affiliate KYOU-TV (channel 15) and K18GU-D (channel 12; translator of KIIN channel 12 in Iowa City). Dual ABC/CBS affiliate KTVO (channel 3) is licensed to and has its main offices near Kirksville, but has a second studio and news bureau in Ottumwa.

The Ottumwa Courier is the primary daily newspaper.

"Ottumwa Radio" is the primary regional radio provider with multiple stations.

== Infrastructure ==
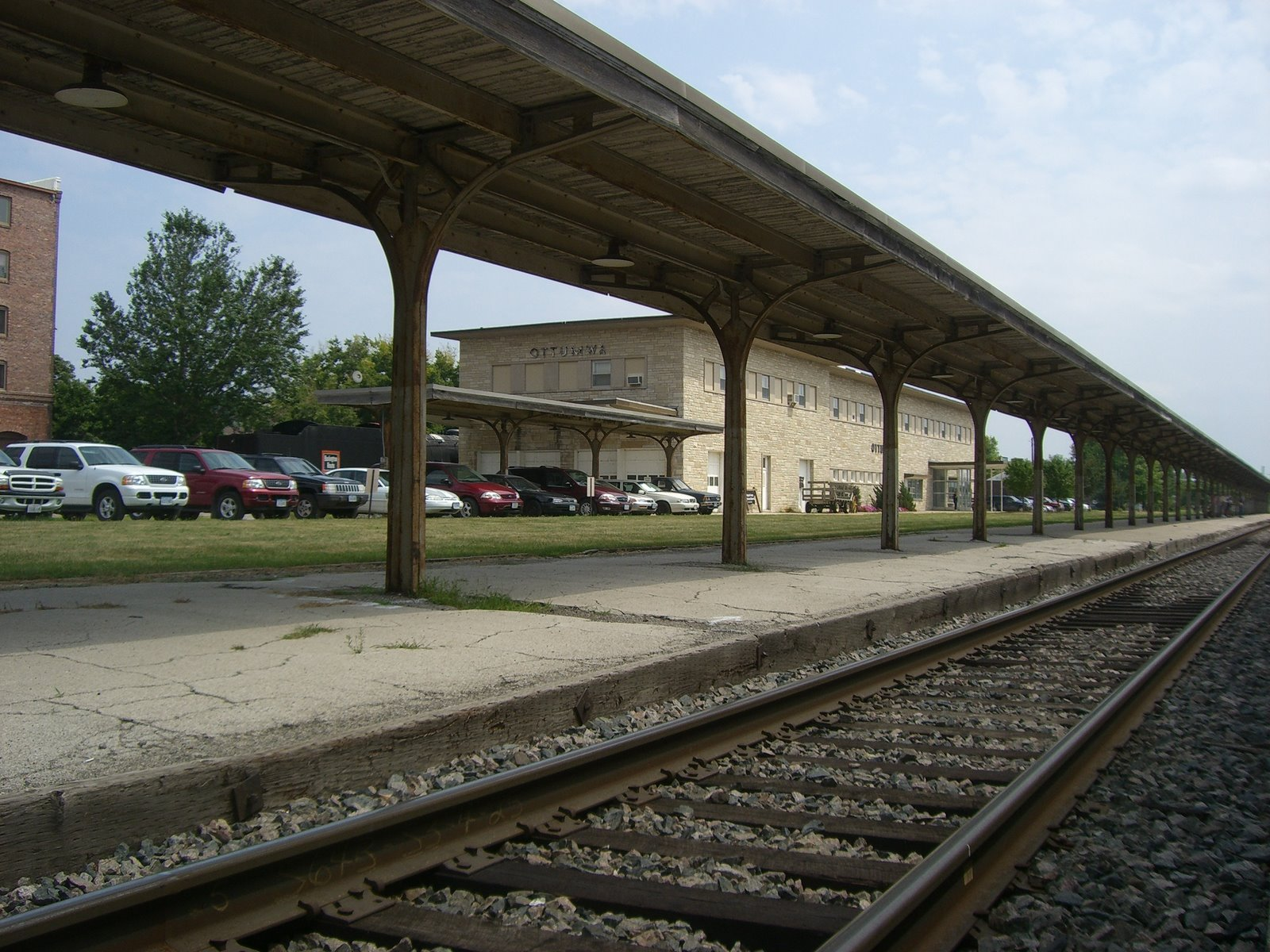
Amtrak passenger rail station and platform

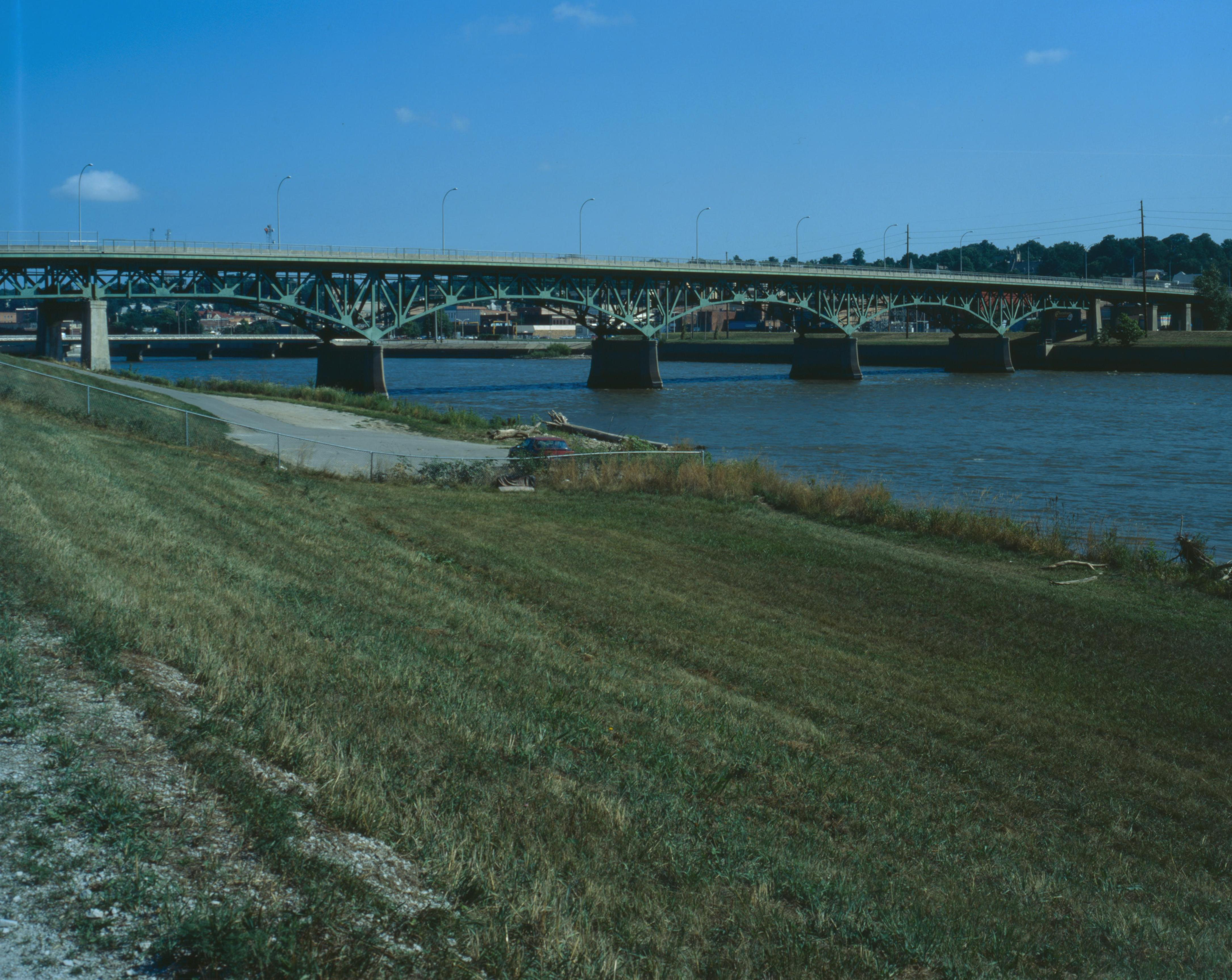
Jefferson Street Viaduct

=== Transportation ===
Ottumwa Regional Airport is a general aviation airport owned by the City of Ottumwa and is operated by the Airport Advisory Board.

Amtrak, the national passenger rail system, provides service to the Ottumwa Amtrak station, operating its California Zephyr daily in both directions between Chicago, Illinois, and Emeryville, California, across the San Francisco Bay from San Francisco.

Ottumwa Transit Authority operates bus services throughout the Ottumwa area. The fixed-route system includes five routes and a shopping shuttle. It also operates a para-transit service known as Ottumwa Transit Authority Lift and Job Access Reverse Commute (JARC), a dial-a-ride service geared towards employees. The five routes that operate Monday through Friday are: #1 North, #2 East West, #3 South Residential, #4 South Commercial, and #7 Airport. There are also two routes that operate on Saturday only; no routes operate on Sunday.

10–15 Regional Transit Agency provides a regional dial-a-ride service throughout Appanoose, Davis, Jefferson, Keokuk, Lucas, Mahaska, Monroe, Van Buren, Wapello and Wayne counties.

Currently, U.S. Route 34 and Iowa Highway 149 serve the town, replacing a former segment of U.S. Highway 63. Route 63 now bypasses the town as part of the Burlington to Des Moines expressway. The Jefferson Street Viaduct over the Des Moines River is listed on the National Register of Historic Places.

=== Railroads ===
The BNSF Railway has tracks through Ottumwa. This is a major corridor in the Chicago-Omaha line that is double track, and western coal makes up a large percentage of the freight carried on this line. The BNSF tracks travel under U.S. Highway 34, pass through the business district, under the U.S. Highway 63 bridge, cross the Iowa, Chicago and Eastern Railroad tracks at grade, exit Ottumwa, and later cross over the Des Moines River on their way to Albia, Iowa, and later Omaha, Nebraska.

The Iowa, Chicago and Eastern Railroad was acquired by the Canadian Pacific in 2008. Ottumwa is located on the Davenport, Iowa, to Kansas City, Mo. line and is a crew change point.

The Norfolk Southern Railway has trackage rights over the BNSF through Ottumwa.

== Notable people ==
- Tom Arnold, actor
- Chris Ash, head football coach, Rutgers University
- Steve Bales, Apollo 11 flight controller
- Jason Black, former professional mixed martial artist
- Stephen Blumberg, notorious rare book thief
- Bud Clancy, Major League Baseball player
- Walter Day, video game statistician
- Charles H. Dingle, member of the New Hampshire House of Representatives
- Edna Ferber, novelist who lived in Ottumwa as a child
- Elnora M. Gilfoyle, occupational therapist and educator.
- Donald Keyhoe, Marine Corps major and aviator, UFO researcher and author
- Dan Knight, jazz pianist, Steinway artist, composer, Pulitzer Prize nominee
- Bob Lee (baseball), Major League Baseball pitcher
- Kevin Lewis, distance runner
- Herschel Loveless (1911–1989), Mayor of Ottumwa 1949–53, 34th Governor of Iowa 1957–61
- Emma Louise Lowe, musician, educator, former First Lady of American Samoa and former First Lady of Guam. Born in Ottumwa.
- E. J. Mather, college football and basketball player and coach. Born in Ottumwa.
- Mariannette Miller-Meeks, Iowa Congresswoman, U.S. House of Representatives. Long-time Ottumwa resident.
- Jack E. McCoy, Iowa state legislator
- Arthur A. McGiverin, the longest-serving Chief Justice of the Iowa Supreme Court. Lived in Ottumwa for many years. Died in 2019 at the age of 90.
- R. W. Scott McLeod, U.S. Department of State official and Ambassador to Ireland; grew up in Ottumwa
- Karen Morley, actress and political activist; born as Mildred Linton, she was adopted and left Iowa for California with her family at age 13
- Carol Morris, Miss Iowa USA 1956, Miss USA 1956, Miss Universe 1956
- Honoré Willsie Morrow, author, editor
- Harry Ostdiek, Major League Baseball player
- Beverley Owen, actress
- Overton Phillips, racing driver
- Mary Florence Potts, iron inventor
- Daniel F. Steck, U.S. senator (1926–1931)
- Hal Walker (1896–1972), film director
- Jake Weimer (1873–1928), Major League Baseball player 1903–05
- Adam Young, musician

== In popular culture ==
- Cpl. Walter "Radar" O'Reilly, the company clerk from the M*A*S*H book and television series, was from Ottumwa, Iowa.
- The television movie The Woman Who Loved Elvis starring Roseanne Barr (then the wife of Ottumwa native Tom Arnold) was partially filmed in Ottumwa.
- In the sitcom Roseanne, Roseanne Conner's restaurant, the Lanford Lunch Box, was based on the Canteen Lunch in the Alley, in central downtown Ottumwa, which has been a stopping point for Ottumwans since the 1920s. Many famous patrons have been seen eating a "Canteen", a loose meat sandwich similar to a Maid-Rite.
- The U.S. Navy harbor tug USS Ottumwa (YTB-761) was named for the city
- The 2015 classic video game documentary Man vs Snake starring Walter Day and Billy Mitchell (gamer), featured competitive gaming and arcade culture of the town in the 1980s, while also being the main setting of local resident Tim McVey's attempts to reclaim the world record high score on Nibbler.
