= Foster/Bell House =

Historic house in Iowa, United States

- U.S. National Register of Historic Places
- U.S. Historic district – Contributing property
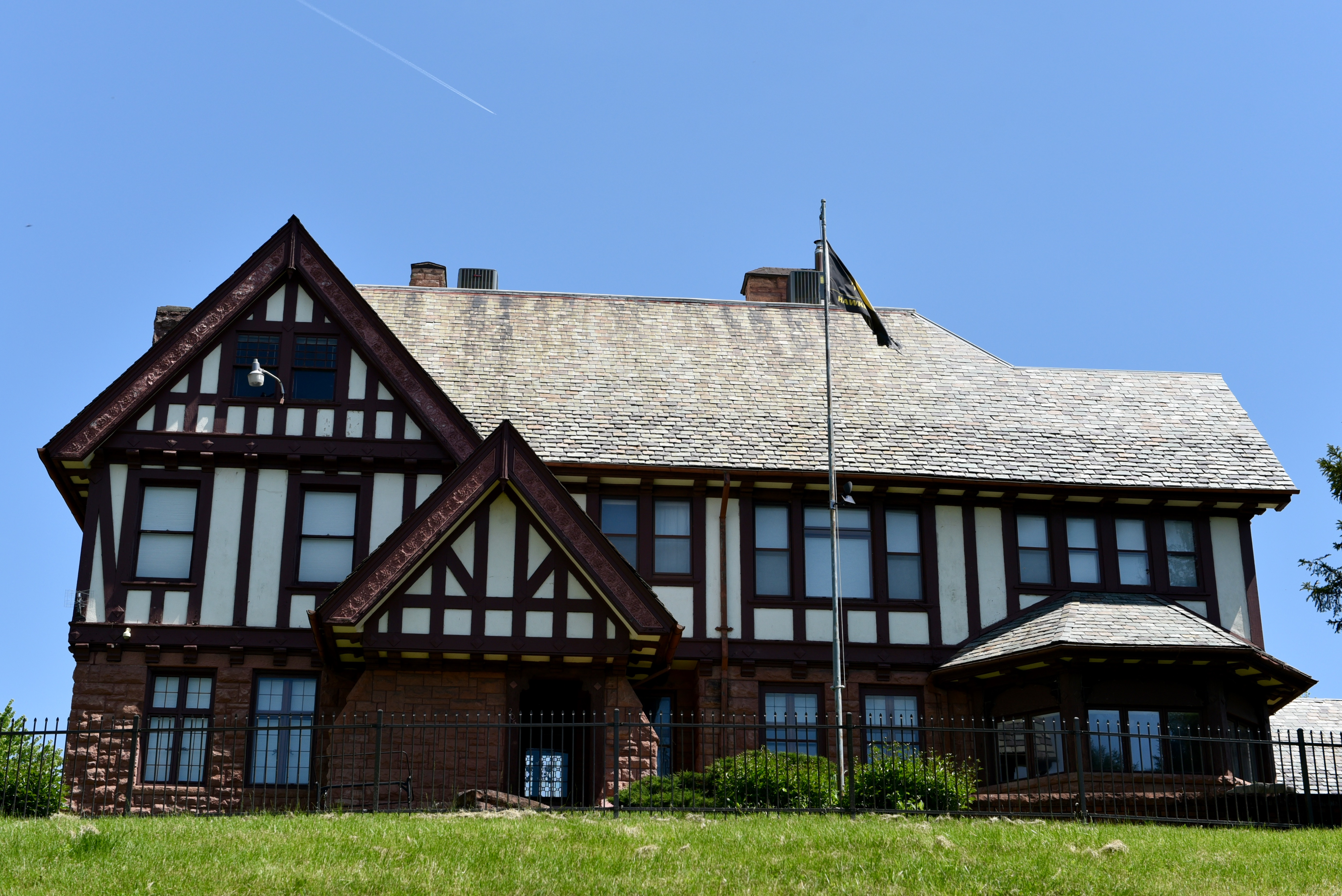
- Image of the Foster Bell House in Ottumwa, Iowa

- Location within Iowa Location within the United States
- Location: 205 E. 5th St. Ottumwa, Iowa
- Coordinates: 41°1′11″N 92°24′27″W
- Built: 1893, 1923
- Architect: Ernest Koch; Kraetsch and Kraetsch; Tinsley, McBroom & Higgins
- Architectural style: Classical Revival; Tudor Revival
- Part of: Fifth Street Bluff Historic District (ID97001606)
- NRHP reference No.: 83000407
- Added to NRHP: September 29, 1983

The Foster/Bell House is an historic building located in Ottumwa, Iowa, United States. The original house on the property was the home of Judge H.B. Hendershott built in 1862. He sold the property to Thomas D. Foster in the early 1890s. He was the chairman and general manager of the meat packing firm John Morrell & Company from 1893 to 1915. Foster hired architect Ernest Koch to design the present residence. It was originally a frame and stone house in the Neoclassical style that was completed in 1893. The house passed to Foster's daughter Ellen Foster Bell who hired the Des Moines architectural firm of Kraetsch and Kraetsch. They redesigned the exterior to its present Tudor Revival style in 1923. The architectural firm of Tinsley, McBroom & Higgins made significant changes to the interior in 1929. It features Sioux Falls red granite on the main floor.

The house's historical significance is derived from its Tudor Revival architecture realized on a large scale. Its association with Thomas Foster is negated by the building's 1923 remodeling. The property was individually listed on the National Register of Historic Places in 1983. It was included as a contributing property in the Fifth Street Bluff Historic District in 1998.
