= Wapello County Courthouse =

- U.S. National Register of Historic Places
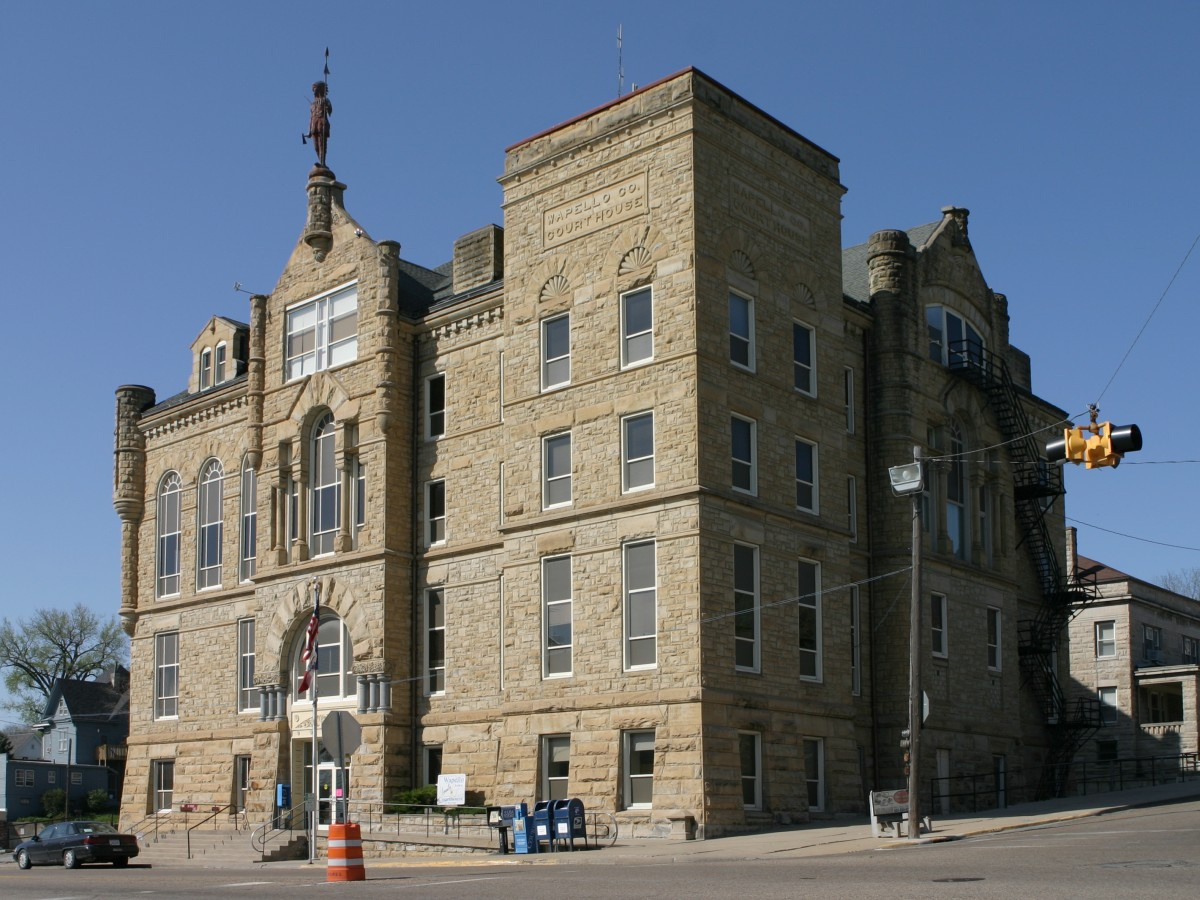

- Location within Iowa Location within the United States
- Interactive map showing the location for Wapello County Courthouse
- Location: Court St. Ottumwa, Iowa
- Coordinates: 41°1′11″N 92°24′38″W
- Area: less than one acre
- Built: 1894
- Built by: C. Stanfford
- Architect: Foster & Liebbe
- Architectural style: Romanesque
- MPS: County Courthouses in Iowa TR
- NRHP reference No.: 81000272
- Added to NRHP: July 2, 1981

The Wapello County Courthouse was built in 1894 in Ottumwa, Iowa, United States. It was listed on the National Register of Historic Places in 1981 as a part of the County Courthouses in Iowa Thematic Resource. The courthouse is the county's fourth building used for court functions and county administration. It is part of the Central Park area, which includes: Ottumwa Public Library, Ottumwa City Hall, and St. Mary of the Visitation Catholic Church.

== History ==
The first courthouse in Wapello County was a single-story log cabin. In 1846, it was replaced by a two-story square frame structure measuring 24 by 24 feet (7.3 by 7.3 m). It was built for $1,000. The first floor was used as a schoolhouse, church, courthouse, dancehall, and a place for political meetings. The second floor was used for office space. In 1855, the building was sold to the Christian Church (Disciples of Christ) for their use. It was later sold to W.C. Grimes, who used it to build wagons. The building was destroyed in a fire in 1872. It had been replaced by a brick structure measuring 60 by 40 feet (18 by 12 m). It was also used as a theater, lecture hall, opera house, and place of worship. The present courthouse was built for $135,000 and dedicated in 1894. The significance of the courthouse is derived from its association with the county government and the political power and prestige of Ottumwa as the county seat.

== Architecture ==
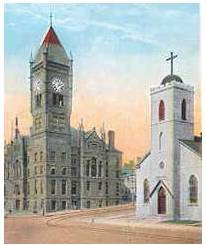
Wapello County Courthouse showing the clock tower and spire removed in 1950.

The present courthouse was constructed of rough-cut sandstone in the Richardsonian Romanesque style. It was designed by the Des Moines architectural firm of Foster & Liebbe, and C. Stanfford was the contractor who built it. The four-story building measures 101-by-94-foot (31 by 29 m), and a statue of Chief Wapello rests on a pedestal high above the main entrance. Until 1950, the building featured a clock tower and spire on the corner tower. It was removed for safety reasons. The triple window with the arched opening in the center mimics the massive round arch entry in the floor above. The cluster of columns that flank the entrance is made of granite, and the columns in between the windows above the entrance are made of smooth limestone. A foliated pattern appears above the granite columns. The cornice, just below the roofline, features small square-cut stone blocks called dentils.

The interior has been renovated over the years, but it features an ornate cast-iron staircase behind the elevator shaft. The newel post is a short, squat column with a foliated capital. The ironwork on the balustrade combines linear and curvilinear forms. Colorful glazed tile floors are found above the building's first floor. Various colors and designs are used in different parts of the building.

The wainscoting on the first floor is made of yellow and blue glazed tiles that were popular in the 1890s. The rest of the building comprises decorative wood panels. It features fluted pilasters and square panels with flowers. The doorways are deeply recessed and feature a transom above a multi-paneled door. The framing is milled woodwork that creates the effect of a fluted pilaster, as well as decorative corner and side blocks. he corner and side blocks feature a fleur-de-lis pattern and various floral patterns, respectively. A simple cornice tops each doorway. The woodwork continues in the courtroom. Behind the judge's bench is a decorative panel that contains a classical urn with a vine and leaf pattern and the Latin phrase Fiat Justitia (Let there be Justice). Another panel is on the front of the bench and contains a female figure in the middle surrounded by foliage and two banners that repeat the Latin phrase.
