= Coal Palace =

Temporary exhibition center in Ottumwa, Iowa, US

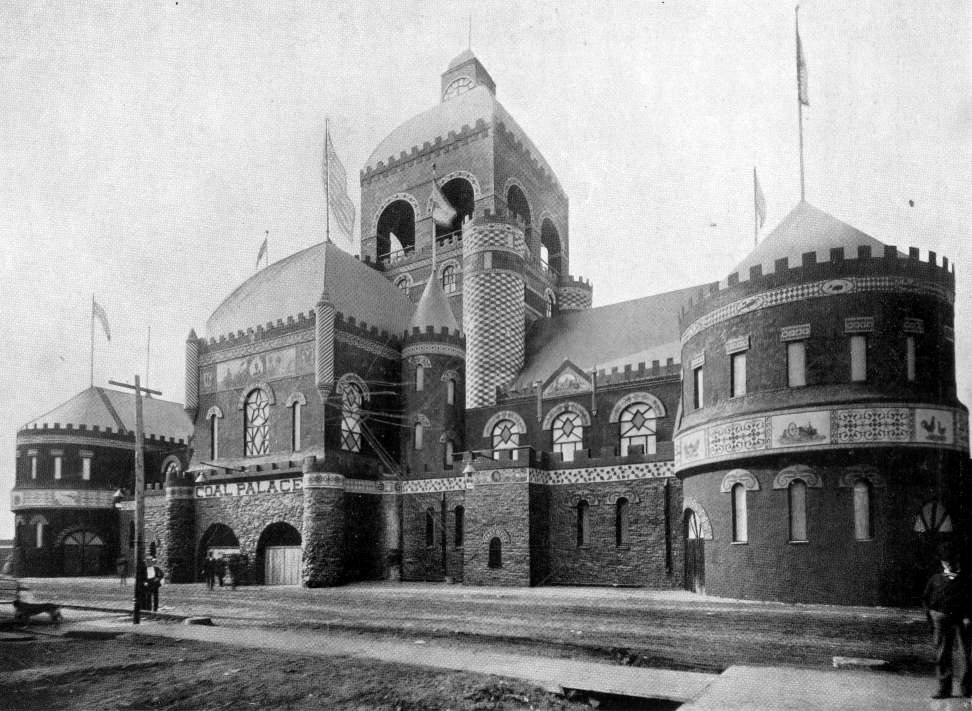
- Motto: Coal is light, heat, and power.
- Interactive map of the Coal Palace area

General information
- Architectural style: Byzantine, Gothic
- Location: W. Main St. and S. Washington St., Ottumwa, Iowa, U.S.
- Coordinates: 41°1′8.51″N 92°24′53.52″W
- Elevation: ~650 ft (198 m)
- Inaugurated: September 16, 1890
- Demolished: 1892
- Cost: $25,000–$30,000
- Owner: Ottumwa Coal Palace Company

Height
- Height: Central tower: 200 ft (61 m)

Dimensions
- Diameter: 230 ft × 130 ft (70 m × 40 m)

Design and construction
- Architect: Charles P. Brown

The Coal Palace was a temporary exhibition center that stood in Ottumwa, Iowa, from 1890 until 1892. It was used most prominently to showcase the local coal mining industry.

During its brief history President Benjamin Harrison and Congressman William McKinley visited the building, but a decline in attendance and nature's toll on the building's exterior ultimately resulted in the building's demolition in 1892.

== Background ==
Although Iowa is most known for its rich soil and subsequent agriculture industry, Iowa had a thriving coal mining industry throughout the last half of the nineteenth century. Bituminous coal deposits, formed during the Pennsylvanian subperiod, are found throughout much of south-central Iowa, and demand for coal in Iowa grew steadily as railroad construction moved westward. By 1870, several railroad lines stretched across the state, each requiring a constant supply of coal.

The opening of hundreds of coal mines across southern Iowa coincided with industrialization and the popularity of local expositions designed to showcase agriculture, commerce, and industry. An unusual trend emerged from this confluence in Iowa: massive and opulent but temporary exhibition halls were built to house these expositions, and each was a lumber structure featuring walls veneered with the material being celebrated. Following the Corn Palace in Sioux City, the Blue Grass Palace in Creston, and the Flax Palace in Forest City, the city of Ottumwa attempted to capitalize on its largest industries with a palace of its own—the Coal Palace.

== Funding and construction ==
The brainchild of three prominent citizens—Colonel Peter G. Ballingall, Calvin Manning, and Henry Phillips—the Coal Palace was first conceived in late 1889, at which time the Ottumwa Coal Palace Company was established with ownership interests in the company available for $5 per share. Initially very few shares were purchased; only when an emergency meeting was called among Ottumwa's business leaders, at which Peter G. Ballingall offered to purchase $700 in shares, was interest seriously revived. Eventually 395 citizens subscribed (the top subscriber was Thomas D. Foster, manager of the Morrell meatpacking plant, with $1,000), and the company had secured more than $30,000.

Construction began in the summer of 1890 on a lot donated by Ballingall known as the Sunken Park. The park had previously been a bed of the Des Moines River but was essentially made a slough by the constructed embankment of the Chicago, Burlington and Quincy Railroad, and Ballingall had since transformed the area into a park. Ten area counties—Appanoose, Davis, Jefferson, Keokuk, Lucas, Mahaska, Marion, Monroe, Van Buren, and Wapello—donated coal for the construction, and each county created an exhibit for the exposition.

Approximately 300 piles were used to bring the ground floor to street level and create the structure's foundation. From there more than 800,000 feet (240,000 m) of lumber in solid sheets was used to form the framing. Coal was veneered onto the walls and fused with black mortar, effectively giving the building the look of a medieval stone-clad castle. For the second floor, lighter and smaller forms of bituminous coal—nut and pea—were used, and the roof was coated with highly reflective vitric coal and red mortar. Vitric coal was also used to spell "Coal Palace" above the main entrance.

== Architecture ==
Sioux City architect Charles P. Brown was contracted to design the Coal Palace; he had previously designed the first Corn Palace in Sioux City and was at the time planning the second. Born in Salem, Massachusetts, Brown moved to Sioux City in 1886 and had designed much of its downtown.

=== Exterior ===
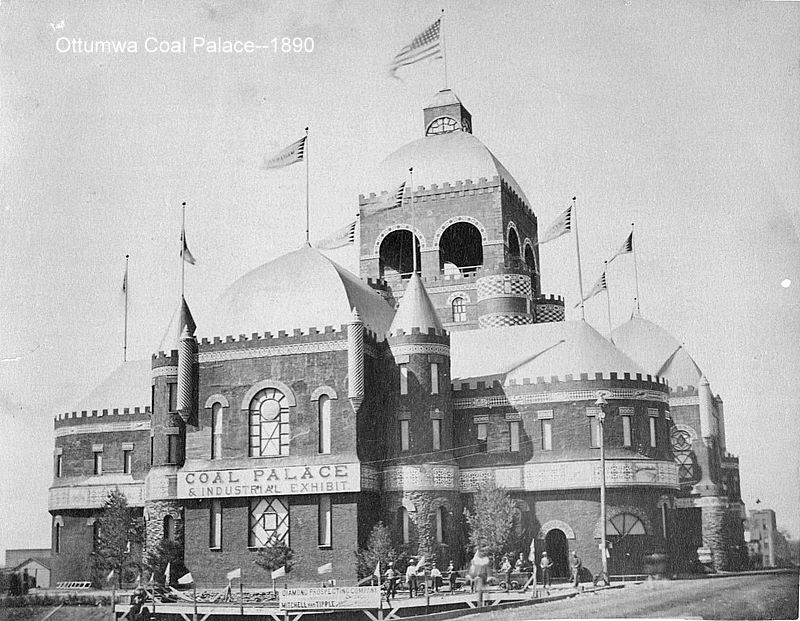
The exterior from the east.

Brown recognized the inherent medieval quality of walls covered in uncut coal and capitalized on this theme by adding turrets, crenellated walls, and spired roofs. Ten flags with the names of the ten coal-donating counties adorned the roof, along with two Coal Palace flags and two large American flags. The primary entrance to the building was through two archways along the northern side, though four semi-circular turrets on the ground floor also contained doors. The Ottumwa Daily Courier remarked on the completed exterior's artistic detailing in 1890:

Aloft in the main tower, a 'hanging garden of Babylon,' with richest contribution of the tropics, with a frieze of classic figures in relief round the entire building, carefully and artistically chiseled out of bituminous blocks which make 'light, heat, and power.' With flagstaffs on the various turrets proudly waving the pennant of the various countries which the palace is to represent, and with the undisputable evidence of Uncle Samuel's higher authority even over the rich feudal baron, King Coal, from the Stars and Stripes waving from the staff of the main tower—a new flag with 44 stars in the field of azure.

— Ottumwa Daily Courier

Numerous friezes along the exterior walls reflected both neoclassicism, still strong in the late nineteenth century, and local industry. Among the designs either carved into coal or fancifully painted along the outer walls were a head of Ajax, a series of lions' heads festooned with produce, a depiction of the Carboniferous period connected to a modern coal mine by a miner and pickaxe, and several medallions celebrating local trades—blacksmithing, lumbering, plumbing, masonry, farming, machining, and carpentering were all visible. The smallest turrets were adorned with silver and black stripes, while two gables above the second floor depicted the goddess Ceres watching over farmers and Vulcan watching over factories. After dusk, arc lamps in the towers and colored, electric lights in the windows lit the structure to make "the scene more splendid than any illuminated castle of the rich barons of the middle ages."

The eastern portion of the sunken park (extending to Washington Street) remained a garden, though several landscaping features (fountains, walking paths, and exotic foliage) were added.

=== Interior ===
All interior decorations were overseen by D. E. Milward and D. S. Clark of Sioux City, two men who had previously designed the Corn Palace. The interior of the Coal Palace was no less ostentatious then its exterior. The pillars, rafters, railings, and ceilings which supported the upper floor were largely covered by decorations of barley, blue grass, clover, corn, flax, millet, oats, rye, timothy, and wheat—all native and common to Iowa. Along with lavish displays created by the Iowa counties who had donated coal to construct the Coal Palace, several area businesses and organizations also created displays, including the Morrell Meat Packing Company, T. M. Sinclair & Co. of Cedar Rapids, R. T. Davis Mill Company of St. Joseph, Missouri, the Northern Pacific Railway, the P.E.O. Sisterhood of Ottumwa, Pi Beta Phi, and the Blue Grass Region of Iowa (a consortium of 21 counties in southwestern Iowa). Several prominent citizens also donated historical objects and curiosities.

The exhibits surrounded the central portion of the hall, which contained a large auditorium and stage. Behind the 1,080 square feet (100 m^{2}) stage stood a waterfall lit by 700 lights and which fell 40 feet (12 m). It required approximately 1,600,000 US gallons (6,100,000 L; 1,300,000 imp gal) of water daily. Half of the water landed in a lake a further 15 feet below, while the other half navigated a series of boulders and escarpments. A suspension bridge and live spruces and firs completed this effect. The seating capacity of the auditorium was estimated to be as high as 8,000.

The central tower featured an observation gallery and dance floor, and could be reached from the main gallery floor by two elevators or a flight of stairs. From the gallery visitors could be lowered into what was perhaps the Coal Palace's most unusual feature: a miniature, working coal mine beneath the main floor. Taking advantage of the sunken park, this coal mine tour was led by a mule and allowed visitors to observe the coal mining process as miners dug into actual coal.

== Expositions ==
The Coal Palace was opened once yearly for a month-long exposition and festival in September and October. The expositions were enthusiastically promoted by the subscribers of the company, each of whom received a metal medallion for their financial support.

=== 1890 ===
In 1890 the Coal Palace officially opened on September 16 and closed on October 11. On opening day, a parade proceeded to the Palace at 1:30 p.m. with Governor Horace Boies, the mayor of Ottumwa, Company G of the Iowa National Guard, and the Iowa State Band leading the way. The governor spoke at length of the thriving coal industry in Iowa, which he lamented was too often overlooked in a state with such a rich agricultural history. The opening of the Coal Palace and the governor's speech were reported in The New York Times.

The Coal Palace organizers arranged special celebration days to boost attendance—Des Moines Day, Missouri Day, and days for each of the surrounding counties each brought thousands of tourists and visitors. But the busiest day at the Coal Palace in 1890 was October 9, when President Benjamin Harrison spent the day in Ottumwa. At approximately 10:00 a.m. he toured the Coal Palace privately and spoke at the exposition before an estimated crowd of 40,000 people in the afternoon:

If I should attempt to interpret the lesson of this structure, I should say it was an illustration of how much that is artistic and graceful is to be found in the common things of life, and if I should make an application of this lesson, it would be to suggest that we might profitably carry into all our homes and into all neighborly intercourse the same transforming spirit.

— President Benjamin Harrison, October 9, 1890

A few minutes after this portion of the speech the waterfall began, and Harrison's voice was briefly drowned out (Harrison suspected the waterfall was turned on by a political opponent). Harrison remained in the Palace that evening and shook hands with nearly 10,000 visitors. When the exposition closed two days later, it was deemed an enormous success, and the company voted to keep the palace standing for use next fall.

=== 1891 ===
Peter G. Ballingall departed for a trip to China in late 1890, and word later reached Ottumwa that he had died suddenly near Hong Kong on March 7, 1891. His funeral was held in the Coal Palace on April 14, with Governor Boies among the attendees. The death of the chief planner and president of the Ottumwa Coal Palace Company created a hitch among the exhibition planners, but the exposition would go on regardless, with Russell A. Alger, John C. Black, and William McKinley slated to give speeches during the celebration.

The festival opened with a parade on September 15, and the largest attendance came on September 23, when an estimated 30,000 to 50,000 people came to hear William McKinley, who spoke from Ottumwa's Central Park to ensure everyone could see and hear him. And although John C. Black drew nearly as many Democratic visitors on October 7 (which was "Democratic Day" at the Coal Palace), enthusiasm generally declined for the 1891 festival. The Coal Palace closed on October 10.

== Legacy ==
Following the 1891 exposition, the Coal Palace was razed in 1892. Its location is now home to Coal Palace Books & Cafe', neighboring Ballingall Park in Ottumwa, a part of the city willed by Ballingall for use as a park "forever." Coal mining in Iowa is no longer a major industry. Despite this, the Coal Palace remains a legendary part of Ottumwa history, arriving (and departing) at a time when Ottumwa was often referred to as the "Lowell of the West." Manufacturing remains a major part of Ottumwa's economy. In 1998, a miniature replica of the Coal Palace was completed by local historian Milly Morris-Amos, and it is visible today in the Iowa Heartland History Connection - Wapello County Historical Museum.
