= Jack E. McCoy =

American politician

Member of the Iowa House of Representatives for the 18th district
- In office 1955–1959

Personal details
- Born: May 28, 1929 Ottumwa, Iowa, United States
- Died: December 29, 2014 (aged 85) Miami, Florida, United States
- Party: Democratic
- Spouse: Gerada Talbott McCoy
- Education: Attended Parsons College and Iowa State University
- Occupation: meat packer, labor activist

Jack E. McCoy (May 28, 1929 – December 29, 2014) was an American politician and labor activist.

Born in Ottumwa, Iowa, he worked at the Ottumwa meatpacking plant and served as an officer in the local United Packing House Workers Local 1. He served in the Iowa House of Representatives from 1955 until 1959, after having been elected at the age of 25 and as the first Democrat to ever have been elected to the Iowa House from Wapello County. At the time, he was the youngest person ever to be elected to the Iowa House from any district.

He then served as vice president of the Iowa Federation of Labor. In 1962, he was named to the AFL-CIO national staff and appointed Regional Director of the Committee on Political Education, a position he held for the next 25 years. He retired from the AFL-CIO in 1987.

McCoy resided in Council Bluffs, Iowa from 1974 to 2014. McCoy was involved in the Democratic Party, and was a member of the Veterans of Foreign Wars and the American Legion. He died in Miami, Florida.
