= Ottumwa Transit Authority =

Public transit operator in Wapello County, Iowa

- Locale: Ottumwa, Iowa
- Service area: Wapello County, Iowa
- Service type: bus service, paratransit
- Routes: 5
- Website: https://www.1015transit.com/

The Ottumwa Transit Authority, often shortened to OTA, operates bus transit services throughout Ottumwa area. The fixed-route system includes five routes and a shopping shuttle. It also operates a para-transit service known as Ottumwa Transit Authority Lift and Job Access Reverse Commute (JARC), a dial-a-ride service geared towards employees. The five routes that operate Monday through Friday are: #1 North, #2 East West, #3 South Residential, #4 South Commercial, and #7 Airport. There are also two routes that operate on Saturday only; no routes operate on Sunday. It is governed by the Ottumwa Transit Advisory Board, which makes recommendations to the Ottumwa City Council.

== Routes ==
- #1 North

Operates on the north side of Ottumwa, Iowa, between 6:45 AM and 6:00 PM, Monday through Friday.
Makes regular stops at: Downtown bus depot, Jefferson & Penn, Fourth & Iowa, Ottumwa Regional Health Center, Indian Hills Community College Oak Hall, Tractor Supply, and North Hyvee

- #2 East/West

Operates on the downtown, east end, and west end of Ottumwa, Iowa, between 6:45 AM and 6:00 PM, Monday through Friday.
Makes regular stops at: Downtown bus depot, Second & Taft, Tenco, Downtown bus depot, Herrmann & Main, Fourth & Iowa, and Main & Ash.

- #3 South Residential

Operates on the eastern half of the south side of Ottumwa, Iowa, between 6:45 AM and 6:00 PM, Monday through Friday.
Makes regular stops at: Downtown bus depot, Mary & Madison, Mary & Webster, Williams & Ferry, Madison & Finley, Chester & Ferry, YMCA

- #3A South Residential

Operates on the eastern half of the south side of Ottumwa, Iowa, between 3:00 PM and 4:00 PM, Monday through Friday, August 22, thru June 1.
Makes regular stops at: Chester & Ferry, Mary & Madison, Mary & Webster, Williams & Ferry, Madison & Finley, and the Downtown bus depot.

- #4 South Commercial

Operates on the western half of the south side of Ottumwa, Iowa, between 6:45 AM and 6:00 PM, Monday through Friday.
Makes regular stops at: Downtown bus depot, Camelot Towers, Quincy ave., Venture Dr., South HyVee, Fairway, Wildwood & Greenwood, Chester & Ferry, and Church Street.

- #5 North Saturday

Operates on the north side of Ottumwa, Iowa, between 9:30 AM and 4:00 PM, on Saturdays.
Makes regular stops at: Downtown bus depot, Westgate towers, Herrmann & Main, Ottumwa Regional Health Center, Pennsylvania & Jefferson, North Hy-Vee, and Court & Pennsylvania.

- #6 South Saturday--

Operates on the south side of Ottumwa, Iowa, between 9:30 AM and 4:00 PM, on Saturdays.
Makes regular stops at: Downtown bus depot, Mary & Madison, South Oak Towers, Camelot Towers, Quincy ave., Venture Dr., and Chester & Ferry.

- #7 Airport.

Operates on the North side of Ottumwa, Iowa, and North of Ottumwa between 6:45 AM and 6:00 PM, Monday through Friday.
Makes regular stops at: Indian Hills Community College Bennett Building, North Hyvee, Ottumwa Halfway House, Indian Hills Airport Campus, Ottumwa Job Corp Site, and the Downtown bus depot.

== Controversy ==
The OTA was surrounded by controversy in 2011, following a state audit and investigations by the Federal Transit Administration and the Iowa Department of Transportation. The state auditor's office determined that OTA overstated ridership “by an estimated 50 percent,” and that the inflated numbers were increased by office staff on the instructions of Director Pam Ward. At the same time, allegations arose that OTA altered driver time sheets. The audit report was released on May 24, 2011. On June 1, 2011, Director Pam Ward and Tom Jones, the man union officials say altered driver timesheets, were both placed on indefinite leave. Both were later terminated. On June 7, 2011, the city of Ottumwa decided to take away the Transit Board's autonomy, which had the city officially take over management of the transit system. An investigation followed by the FBI and Federal Transit Authority officers. In January 2013, Ward was indicted on four counts of making false statements to the Department of Transportation regarding ridership numbers. OTA now operates within federal and state guidelines and continues to receive federal and state funding.

== See also ==
- List of bus transit systems in the United States
