= National Register of Historic Places listings in Wapello County, Iowa =

Location of Wapello County in Iowa

This is a list of the National Register of Historic Places listings in Wapello County, Iowa.

This is intended to be a complete list of the properties and districts on the National Register of Historic Places in Wapello County, Iowa, United States. Latitude and longitude coordinates are provided for many National Register properties and districts; these locations may be seen together in a map.

There are 31 properties and districts listed on the National Register in the county.

This National Park Service list is complete through NPS recent listings posted May 1, 2026.

== Current listings ==
	Name on the Register	Image	Date listed	Location	City or town	Description
1	Administration Building, U.S. Naval Air Station Ottumwa	Administration Building, U.S. Naval Air Station Ottumwa	May 14, 2013 (#13000273)	Terminal Ave. 41°06′23″N 92°26′27″W	Ottumwa	
2	Agassiz School	Agassiz School	November 12, 2020 (#100005787)	608 East Williams St. 40°59′53″N 92°25′00″W	Ottumwa	Art Deco-styled elementary school built in 1941.
3	B'nai Jacob Synagogue	B'nai Jacob Synagogue	August 10, 2004 (#04000815)	529 E. Main; 41°00′57″N 92°24′25″W	Ottumwa	
4	Benson Block	Benson Block	January 3, 1985 (#85000009)	109-112 N. Market; 41°01′03″N 92°24′35″W	Ottumwa	
5	Big 4 Fair Art Hall	Big 4 Fair Art Hall	May 18, 1995 (#95000621)	Water St. at the Wapello County Regional Fairgrounds; 40°54′31″N 92°12′53″W	Eldon	
6	Burlington Depot	Burlington Depot	November 26, 2008 (#08001100)	210 W. Main St. 41°01′09″N 92°24′52″W	Ottumwa	
7	Chief Wapello's Memorial Park	Chief Wapello's Memorial Park	March 27, 1975 (#75000700)	Southeast of Agency off U.S. Route 34; 40°59′31″N 92°17′32″W	Agency	
8	Court Hill Historic District	Court Hill Historic District	January 7, 1998 (#97001605)	111 E. Court and 407-1004 N. Court Sts. 41°01′31″N 92°24′31″W	Ottumwa	
9	Dahlonega School No. 1	Dahlonega School No. 1	August 10, 2000 (#00000934)	County Road H25, 2 miles (3.2 km) northeast of Ottumwa; 41°03′30″N 92°22′13″W	Ottumwa	
10	Dibble House	Dibble House	October 1, 1974 (#74002291)	Burton and Gothic Sts. 40°55′18″N 92°12′48″W	Eldon	
11	Eldon Carnegie Public Library	Eldon Carnegie Public Library	May 30, 1996 (#96000604)	608 W. Elm St. 40°55′12″N 92°13′32″W	Eldon	
12	Fifth Street Bluff Historic District	Fifth Street Bluff Historic District	January 7, 1998 (#97001606)	Roughly bounded by Jefferson, E. 6th, Washington, and 4th Sts. 41°01′09″N 92°24′26″W	Ottumwa	
13	First National Bank	First National Bank	August 11, 1995 (#95000970)	131 E. Main St. 41°01′02″N 92°24′42″W	Ottumwa	
14	Foster/Bell House	Foster/Bell House	September 29, 1983 (#83000407)	205 E. 5th St. 41°01′11″N 92°24′27″W	Ottumwa	
15	J.W. Garner Building	J.W. Garner Building	February 12, 2010 (#10000003)	222-224 E. 2nd St. 41°01′03″N 92°24′38″W	Ottumwa	
16	Greater Second Street Historic District	Greater Second Street Historic District	June 14, 2016 (#16000365)	201-315 E. 2nd, 116 N. Green, 109 S. Green & 106-112 N. Market; 41°01′01″N 92°24′34″W	Ottumwa	
17	Historic Railroad District	Historic Railroad District	October 6, 2011 (#11000723)	Main St. to BNSF Railway tracks between Washington St. & Marion St. 41°01′08″N 92°24′53″W	Ottumwa	
18	Hofmann Building	Hofmann Building	December 27, 2010 (#10001085)	101 S. Market St. 41°01′04″N 92°24′40″W	Ottumwa	
19	Hotel Ottumwa	Hotel Ottumwa	September 25, 2012 (#12000815)	107 E. 2nd St. 41°01′07″N 92°24′43″W	Ottumwa	
20	Jay Funeral Home	Jay Funeral Home	August 11, 1995 (#95000971)	220 North Ct. 41°01′12″N 92°24′35″W	Ottumwa	
21	Jefferson Street Viaduct	Jefferson Street Viaduct	May 15, 1998 (#98000475)	Jefferson St. over the Des Moines River; 41°00′39″N 92°24′55″W	Ottumwa	
22	Mars Hill	Mars Hill	September 13, 1974 (#74000814)	Southeast of Ottumwa; 40°53′58″N 92°21′26″W	Ottumwa	
23	McHaffey Opera House	McHaffey Opera House	November 22, 1995 (#95001317)	414 Elm St. 40°55′04″N 92°13′22″W	Eldon	
24	North Fellows Historic District	North Fellows Historic District	December 27, 2010 (#10001087)	1200 block of N. Fellows St. and 1204-1212 N. Elm St. 41°01′37″N 92°23′49″W	Ottumwa	
25	Ottumwa Cemetery Historic District	Ottumwa Cemetery Historic District	August 11, 1995 (#95000968)	1302 North Ct. 41°01′59″N 92°24′31″W	Ottumwa	
26	Ottumwa Public Library	Ottumwa Public Library	April 27, 1984 (#84001605)	129 N. Court St. 41°01′11″N 92°25′21″W	Ottumwa	
27	Ottumwa Young Women's Christian Association	Ottumwa Young Women's Christian Association	August 24, 2005 (#05000907)	133 W. 2nd St. 41°01′17″N 92°24′46″W	Ottumwa	
28	St. Joseph Hospital Historic District	St. Joseph Hospital Historic District	October 13, 2015 (#15000729)	312 E. Alta Vista & 317 Vanness Aves. 41°02′14″N 92°23′57″W	Ottumwa	
29	U.S. Post Office	U.S. Post Office	August 13, 1976 (#76000810)	Court and 4th Sts. 41°01′07″N 92°24′38″W	Ottumwa	
30	Vogel Place Historic District	Vogel Place Historic District	August 11, 1995 (#95000967)	Roughly bounded by the Ottumwa Country Club, Court St., the Ottumwa Cemetery, and the former St. Joseph Hospital; 41°02′15″N 92°24′10″W	Ottumwa	
31	Wapello County Courthouse	Wapello County Courthouse	July 2, 1981 (#81000272)	Court St. 41°01′11″N 92°24′38″W	Ottumwa	

== Former listings ==
	Name on the Register	Image	Date listed	Date removed	Location	Description
1	Benson Building	Benson Building	August 11, 1995 (#95000969)	March 7, 2019	214 E. 2nd St. 41°01′01″N 92°24′37″W	On January 6, 2018, the structure caught fire and was destroyed.

== See also ==
- List of National Historic Landmarks in Iowa
- National Register of Historic Places listings in Iowa
- Listings in neighboring counties: Davis, Jefferson, Keokuk, Mahaska, Monroe
