= Jefferson Street Viaduct =

- U.S. National Register of Historic Places
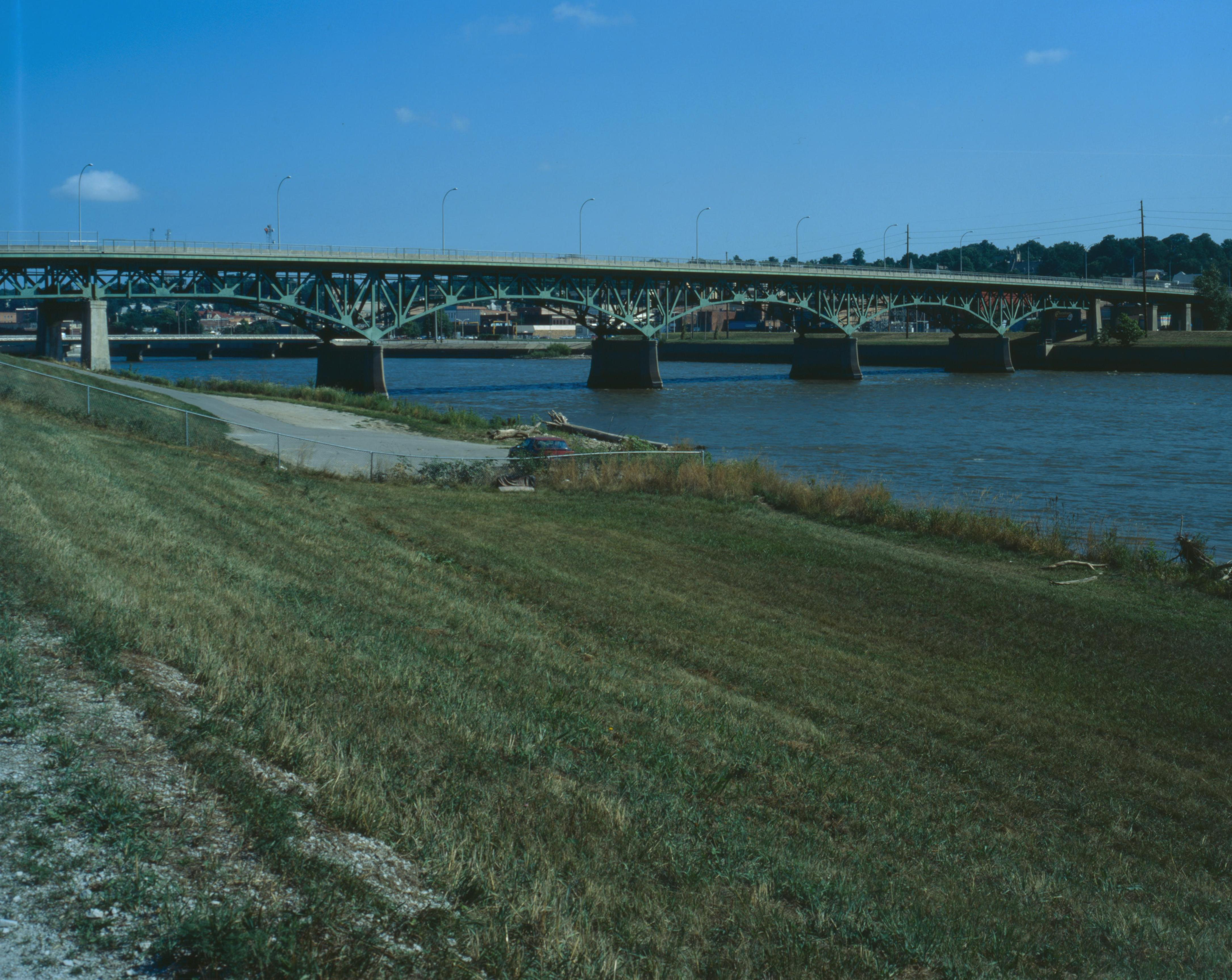

- Location within Iowa Location within the United States
- Location: Jefferson Street over the Des Moines River, Ottumwa, Iowa
- Coordinates: 41°0′39″N 92°24′55″W
- Built: 1935–1936
- Architect: Iowa State Highway Commission
- Architectural style: Warren deck truss bridge
- MPS: Highway Bridges of Iowa MPS
- NRHP reference No.: 98000475
- Added to NRHP: May 15, 1998

The Jefferson Street Viaduct is a historic structure located in Ottumwa, Iowa, United States. The riveted Warren deck truss bridge was completed in 1936. It was listed on the National Register of Historic Places in 1998 as a part of the Highway Bridges of Iowa MPS.

== History ==
Discussions concerning a new span over the Des Moines River were initiated by the city of Ottumwa in 1921 when Charles Chilton was the mayor. Ottumwa already had two bridges, however, they were better suited to its agricultural past rather than the heavy industry that existed in the city. Meetings were held with officials from the Chicago, Burlington & Quincy, the Chicago, Rock Island & Pacific, and the Chicago, Milwaukee & St. Paul railroads whose tracks would be crossed by a viaduct. Blueprints were drawn up, but the plans were shelved until Edwin Manning became mayor in 1929. He worked for seven years to bring the plans for a new bridge to reality. Manning contacted the Iowa State Highway Commission (ISHC) to design and help support the project financially.

The ISHC agreed to share the costs of the bridge with the city in January 1934. Pittsburgh-Des Moines Steel Company of Des Moines was paid $10,400 to prepare design plans for a steel viaduct and Marsh Engineering Company, also of Des Moines, was paid $10,500 to prepare plans for a reinforced concrete bridge. In December of the same year, bids were submitted and Snyder & Johnson of Humboldt, Iowa, won the bid for the concrete structure and Wisconsin Bridge and Iron Company won the bid for the steel design.

The city council and the mayor chose the more expensive concrete design, and the city promised to cover the increased costs. The contracts between the city and ISHC were declared illegal in 1935 and the contract with Snyder & Johnson was declared null and void. The ISHC took full control of the project, including its financing, and chose the less expensive steel design. The bridge was built in fifteen months in 1935 and 1936. It was dedicated on May 28, 1936. Iowa Governor Clyde Herring and Mayor Manning presided over the ceremony that was attended by about 15,000 people.

The bridge carried traffic for U.S. Route 34 (US 34) and US 63 until a new bridge was built on the west side of downtown to carry the highway traffic. The bridge underwent a major rehabilitation project in 1983–1984. The original railings were replaced with Jersey barriers at the time.

== Design ==
The Jefferson Street Viaduct has a total of nine main spans and eight approach spans. The south side of the main span consists of four riveted Warren deck trusses. The north side consists of five cantilevered Warren deck truss spans over the river. It is a rare use of deck truss technology in Iowa. The main spans are 150 feet (46 m) long and the whole structure is 2,120.5 feet (646 m) long. The roadway is 33 feet (10 m) wide.

== See also ==
- List of bridges documented by the Historic American Engineering Record in Iowa
- List of bridges on the National Register of Historic Places in Iowa
- National Register of Historic Places listings in Wapello County, Iowa
