= Greater Second Street Historic District =

Historic district in Iowa, United States

- U.S. National Register of Historic Places
- U.S. Historic district
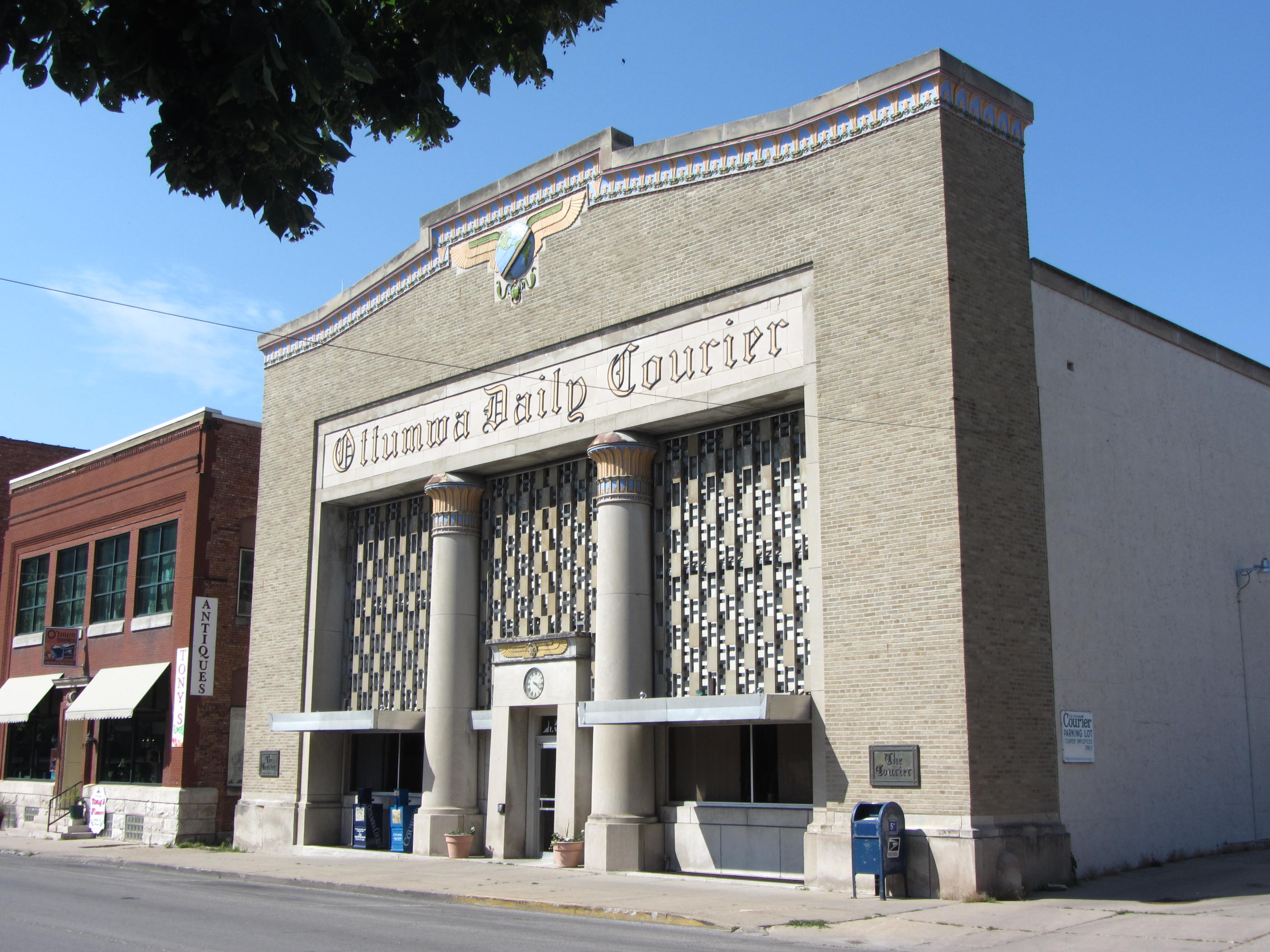
- Ottumwa Courier Building

- Location within Iowa Location within the United States
- Location: 201–315 E. 2nd, 116 N. Green, 109 S. Green & 106–112 N. Market; Ottumwa, Iowa
- Coordinates: 41°01′01″N 92°24′34″W
- Area: 4.7 acres (1.9 ha)
- NRHP reference No.: 16000365
- Added to NRHP: June 14, 2016

The Greater Second Street Historic District is a nationally recognized historic district located in Ottumwa, Iowa, United States. It was listed on the National Register of Historic Places in 2016. At the time of its nomination it contained 12 resources, which included 10 contributing buildings, one non-contributing building, and one non-contributing site. It is located on the northeast side of the central business district. The commercial buildings located here are mostly architect designed, which gives each of them a unique appearance. At the same time, it is a cohesive collection of buildings that exhibit early 20th century styles that are not found anywhere else in Ottumwa. They were either built or they had a new facade added from 1903 to 1930. Eight of the buildings are free-standing, and two of them are set back on their lots. For the most part the buildings housed professional offices and leisure activities. A few of them housed retail business. The Benson Block, the Benson Building, and the J.W. Garner Building are all individually listed on the National Register of Historic Places. Another building is the headquarters of the local newspaper, the Ottumwa Courier.
