= St. Joseph Hospital Historic District =

Historic district in Iowa, United States

- U.S. National Register of Historic Places
- U.S. Historic district – Contributing property
- U.S. Historic district
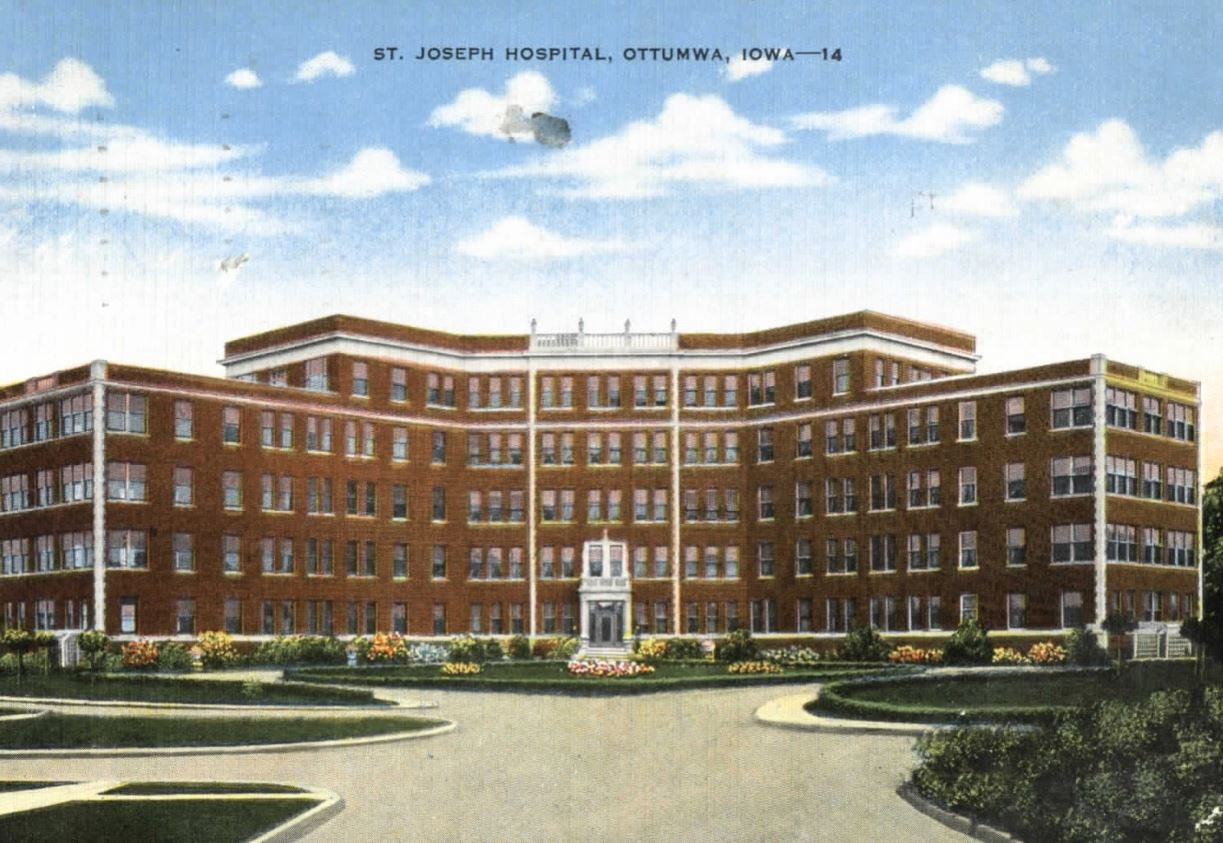
- Former St. Joseph Hospital

- Location within Iowa Location within the United States
- Location: 312 E. Alta Vista & 317 Vanness Aves. Ottumwa, Iowa
- Coordinates: 41°02′13.83″N 92°23′56.84″W
- Area: 10 acres (4.0 ha)
- Built: 1926, 1945, 1960
- Architect: E. Brielmaier & Sons; Brooks & Borg; Dane Morgan
- Architectural style: Classical Revival; Modern movement
- Part of: Vogel Place Historic District (ID95000967)
- NRHP reference No.: 15000729

Significant dates
- Added to NRHP: August 11, 1995
- Designated HD: October 13, 2015

The St. Joseph Hospital Historic District is a former Catholic hospital campus and nationally recognized historic district located in Ottumwa, Iowa, United States. It was listed on the National Register of Historic Places in 2015. At the time of its nomination it contained three resources, which included two contributing buildings, and one contributing structure. Previously, the hospital building was included as a contributing property in the Vogel Place Historic District.

== History ==
The Congregation of the Humility of Mary established themselves in Ottumwa in 1877. They opened their first hospital two years later. St. Joseph Hospital was begun in 1914 and was located next to St. Mary of the Visitation Church on Fourth Street. In 1923, the Sisters sought to raise $100,000 in the community and open a new hospital whose total cost was estimated at $300,000. They came up short and were only able to raise $78,000. Undeterred, they continued on with their plans and hired a hospital architect from Milwaukee, E. Brielmaier & Sons, who had previously designed the Mayo Clinic. The new hospital is a five-story, Y-shaped structure designed in a subdued Neoclassical style. The bricks for the building were made locally at the Morey Brick and Tile Company. It was completed in 1926 and an addition was completed in 1960. The addition was designed by the Des Moines architectural firm of Brooks & Borg. The circular drive from Vogel Street is the contributing structure. It is part of the original plan for the hospital building.

In conjunction with the hospital was the St. Joseph's School of Nursing that had begun in 1914. It remained in operation into the mid-1970s, and in that time it graduated over 700 students. The Nurses residence is a two-story Modern movement structure designed by Burlington, Iowa architect Dane Morgan. It was completed in 1945.

St. Joseph Hospital at its height employed 350 people and provided 120 acute care beds. Ottumwa Hospital initiated several attempts in the 1970s to merge the two hospitals, but St. Joseph's resisted their offers. They did, however, agree to joint planning and cooperation. The two hospitals finally merged in 1987. The St. Joseph building served as office space and housed outpatient services until it was closed in 2012. The building was going to be torn down until Blackbird Investments developed a $14 million plan to renovate it into a 70-unit apartment building in late 2014.
