= Vogel Place Historic District =

Historic district in Iowa, United States

- U.S. National Register of Historic Places
- U.S. Historic district
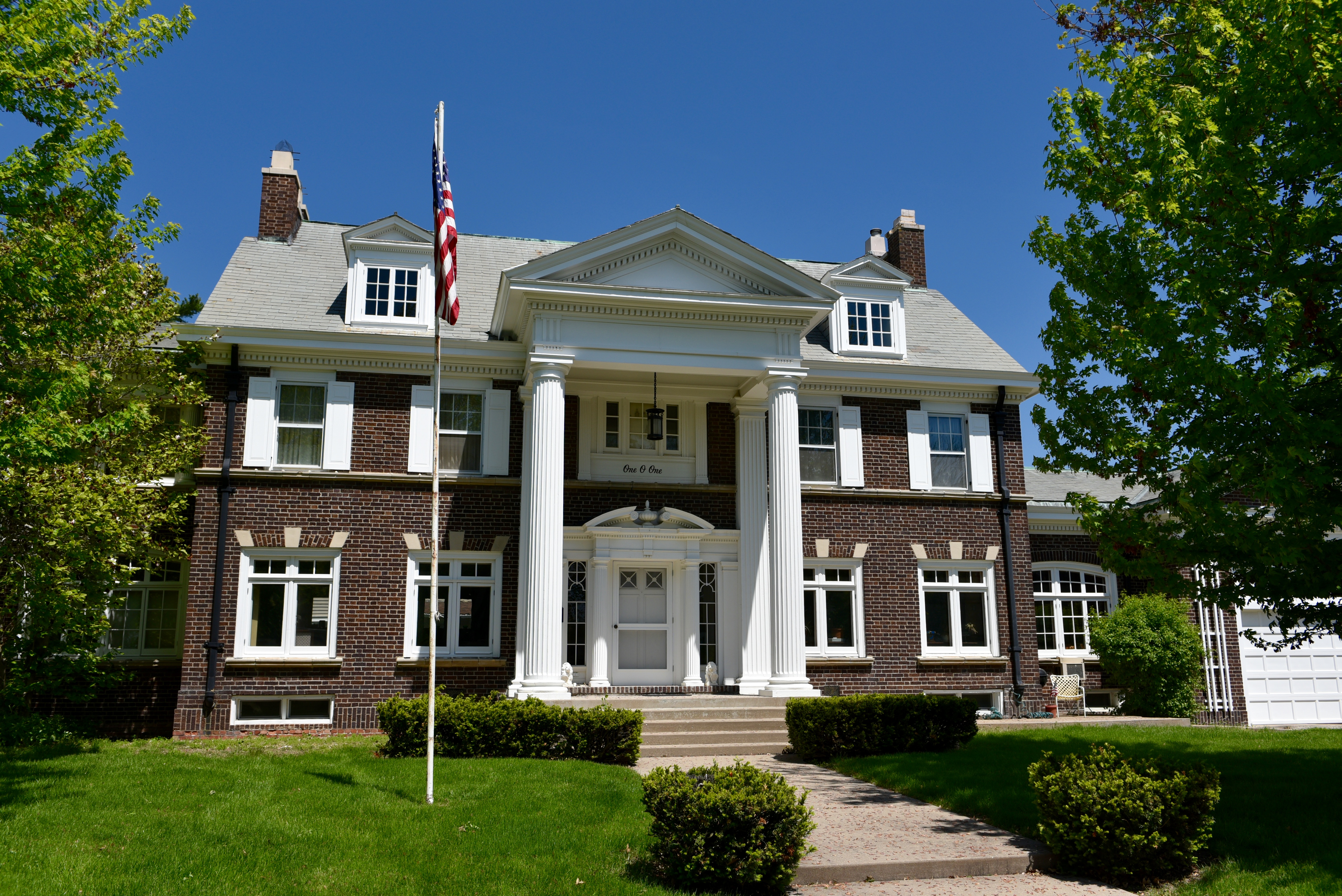

- Location within Iowa Location within the United States
- Location: Roughly bounded by the Ottumwa Country Club, Court St., the Ottumwa Cemetery, and the former St. Joseph Hospital; Ottumwa, Iowa
- Coordinates: 41°2′15″N 92°24′10″W
- Area: 31.6 acres (12.8 ha)
- Architect: George M. Kerns, et al
- Architectural style: Late 19th and 20th Century Revivals; Bungalow; American Craftsman
- MPS: Ottumwa MPS
- NRHP reference No.: 95000967
- Added to NRHP: August 11, 1995

The Vogel Place Historic District is a nationally recognized historic district located in Ottumwa, Iowa, United States. It was listed on the National Register of Historic Places in 1995. At the time of its nomination it contained 158 resources, which included 101 contributing buildings, six contributing structures, and 51 non-contributing buildings.

== History ==
The property that encompasses the Vogel Place Historic District belonged to E.B. and Elizabeth Vogel, from which it derives its name. Upon E.B.’s death the land passed to their daughters. The original plat map was certified by the Wapello County recorder in September 1907 and it was filed by the recorder in March of the following year. The daughters started selling lots in 1908. Most of the houses in the district were built in the 1920s and the 1930s. The Ottumwa Electric Railroad served the neighborhood on North Court Street and was an important means of transportation to the central business district. It was one of the first neighborhoods in the city where a garage was considered an important part of the development. St. Joseph Hospital (1925), a contributing building, was listed as its own historic district on the National Register in 2015.

== Architecture ==
The area covered by the district includes 91 houses, a hospital, a church (non-contributing), a brick paved street, and four distinctive driveways. The houses are basic middle-class structures that are one to two stories tall. Most of the houses are constructed of wood with a small garage behind the house. There are several houses where the exterior is composed of brick veneer and two houses were built of concrete block. Nearly a quarter of the houses were built in either the Bungalow or the American Craftsman styles. They were built between 1912 and 1930. The Tudor Revival style was also common and there are examples of both the half-timbered and English Cottage versions. Larger homes in the Romantic Revival styles are found along North Court Street while some of the other larger homes from the 1920s were built in the Colonial Revival style. There are also five examples of American Four Square houses on Vogel Avenue.
