= Eldon, Iowa =

- City
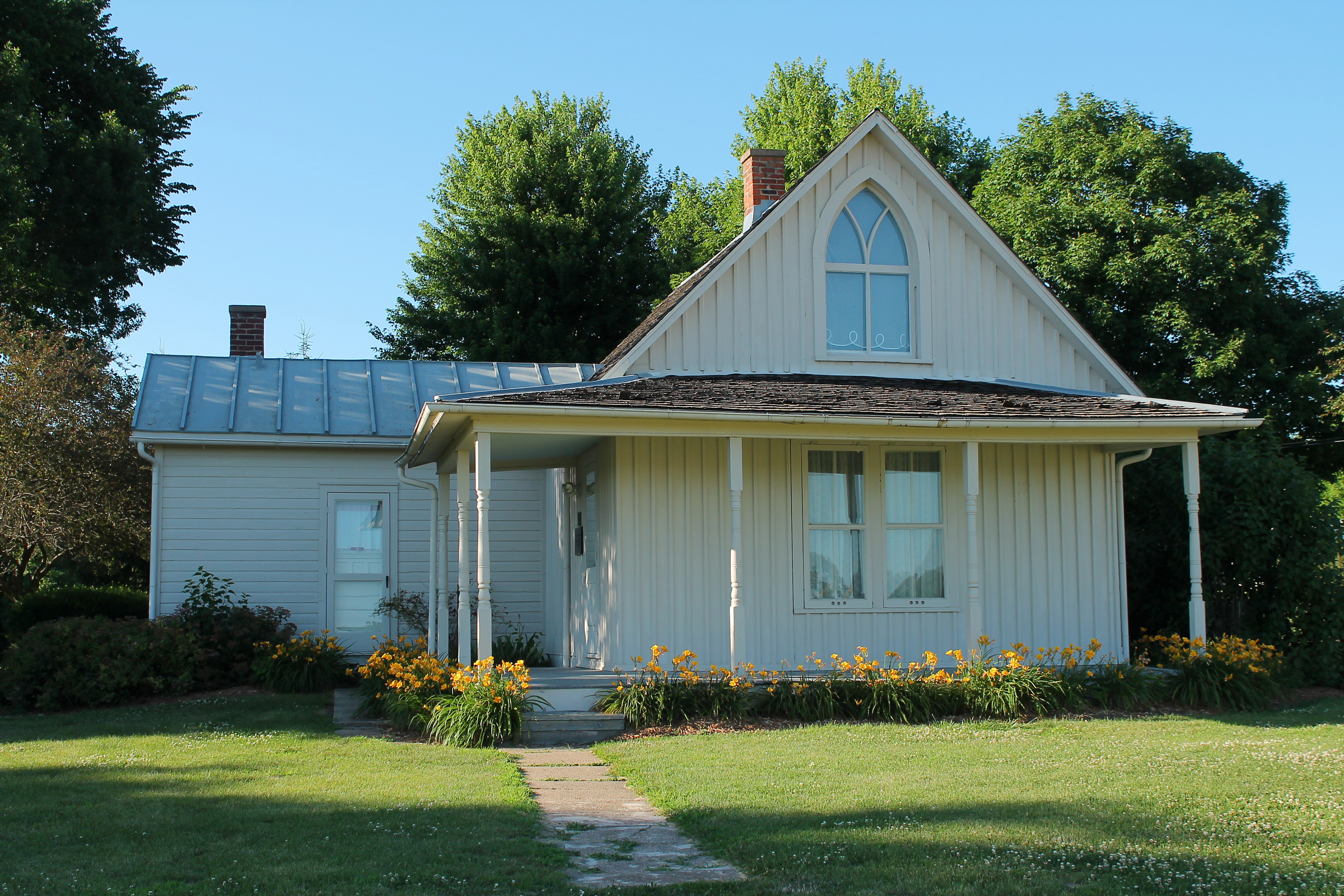
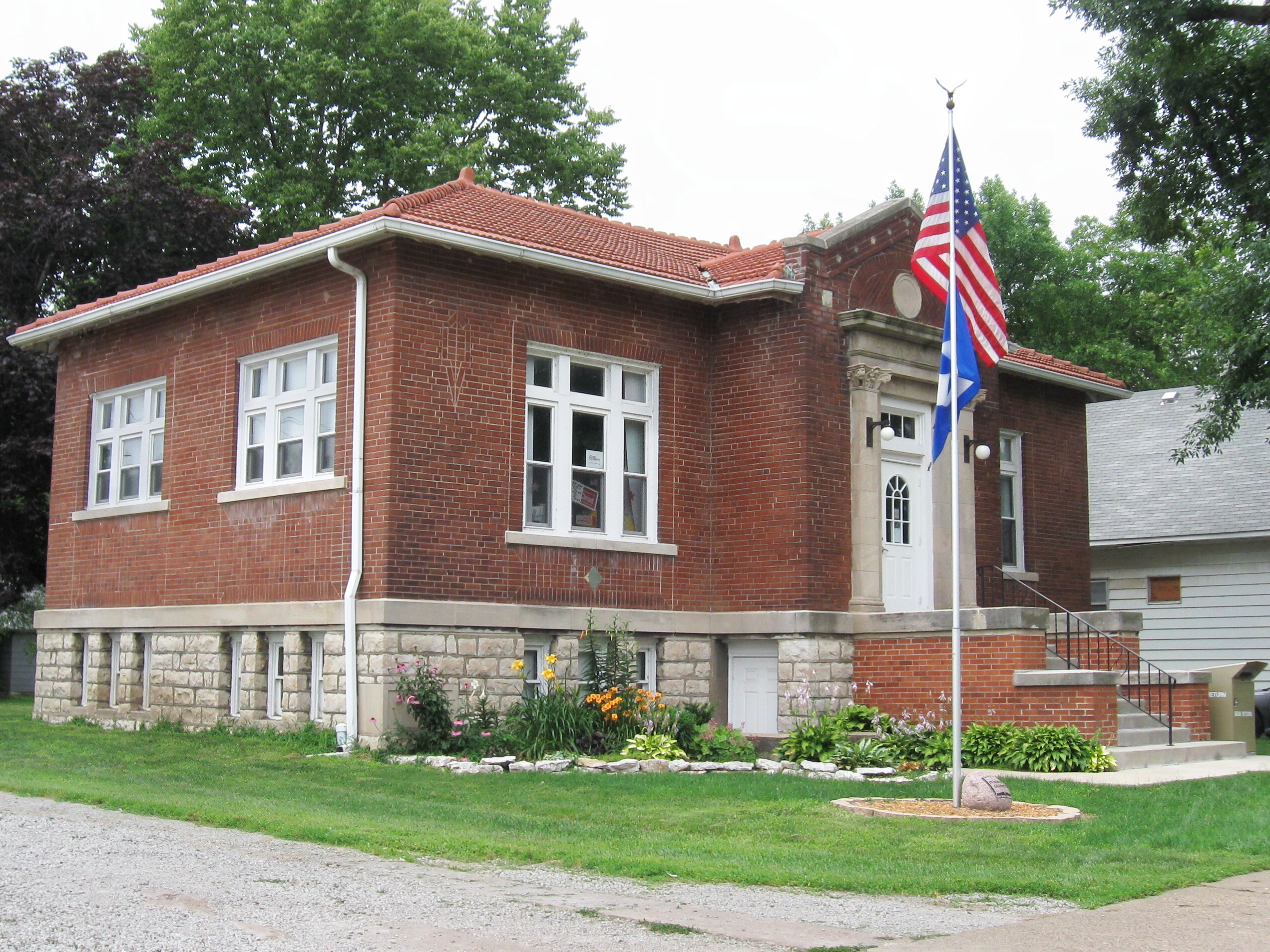
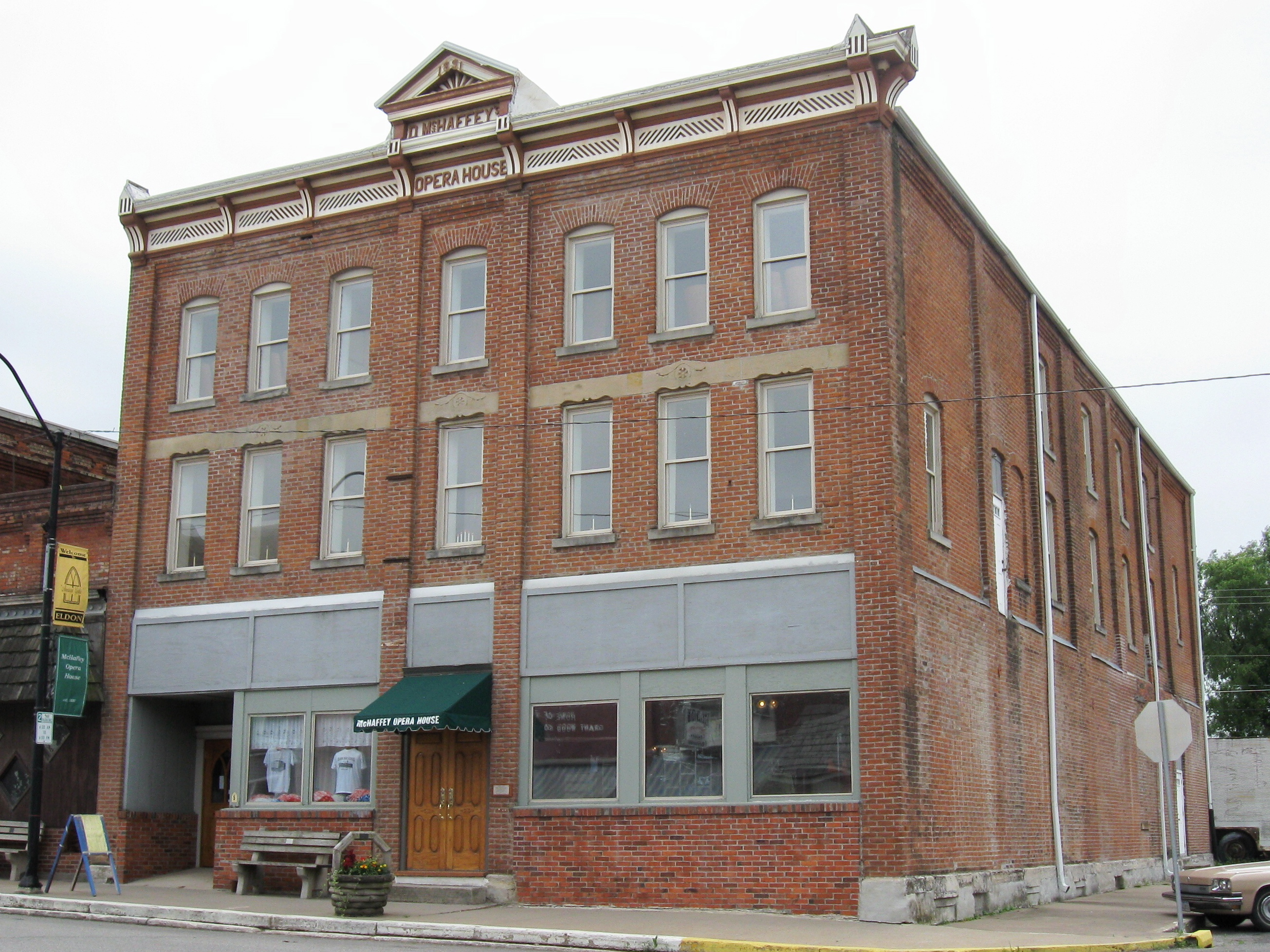
- American Gothic House Eldon Carnegie Library McHaffey Opera House

- Location of Eldon, Iowa
- Coordinates: 40°55′05″N 92°13′05″W
- Country: USA
- State: Iowa
- County: Wapello

Area
  - Total: 1.10 sq mi (2.85 km^{2})
  - Land: 1.09 sq mi (2.83 km^{2})
  - Water: 0.0077 sq mi (0.02 km^{2})
- Elevation: 630 ft (190 m)

Population (2020)
  - Total: 783
  - Density: 715.8/sq mi (276.36/km^{2})
- Time zone: UTC-6 (Central (CST))
  - Summer (DST): UTC-5 (CDT)
- ZIP code: 52554
- Area code: 641
- FIPS code: 19-24420
- GNIS feature ID: 2394637
- Website: www.cityofeldon.org

Eldon is a city in Wapello County, Iowa, United States. The population was 783 at the time of the 2020 census. It is the home of the small Carpenter Gothic style house that served as the backdrop for Grant Wood's 1930 painting, American Gothic.

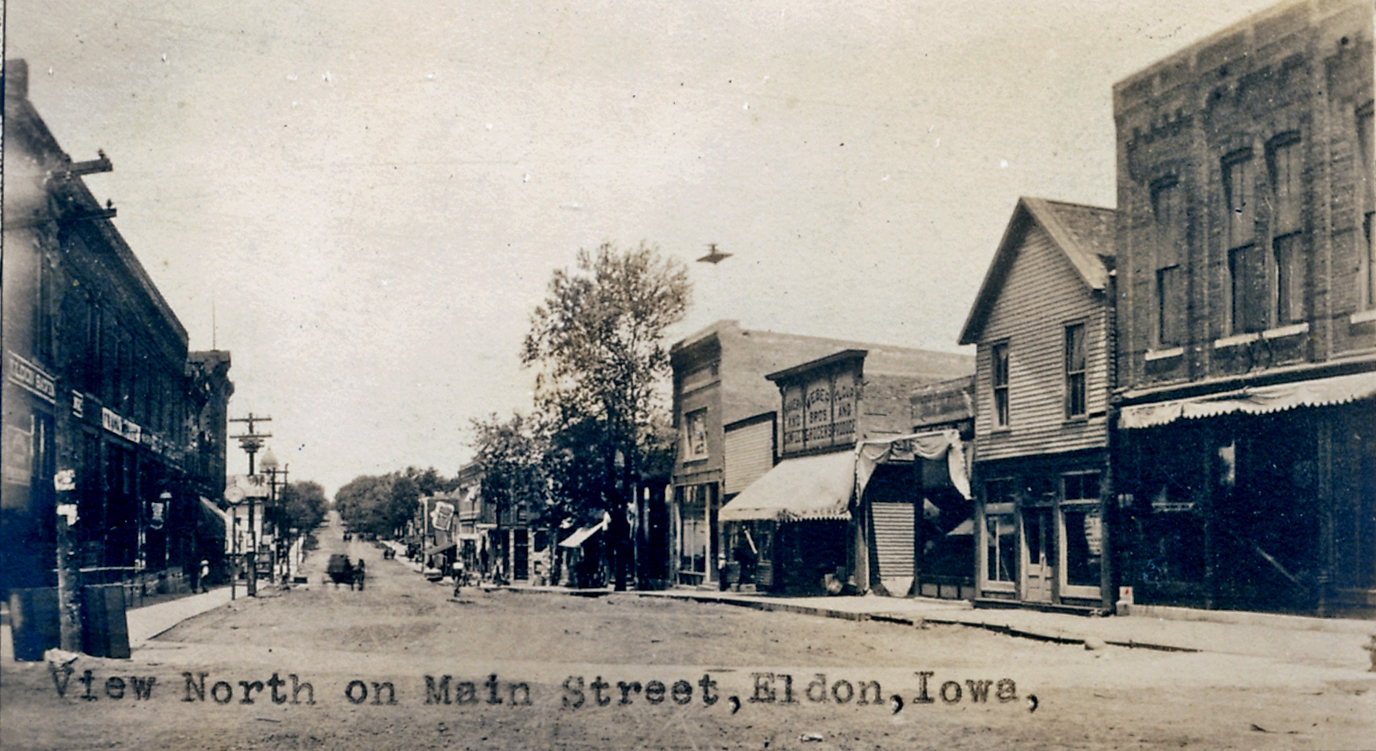
Main Street in Eldon in around 1910

Eldon got its start in the year 1870, following construction of the Keokuk and Des Moines Railway through the territory. It was incorporated in 1872.

Roseanne Barr and Tom Arnold, who was born in nearby Ottumwa, operated Roseanne and Tom's Big Food Diner in Eldon from 1993 to 1995.

Eldon is also the home of the Wapello County Fair which began in 1868.

== Geography ==
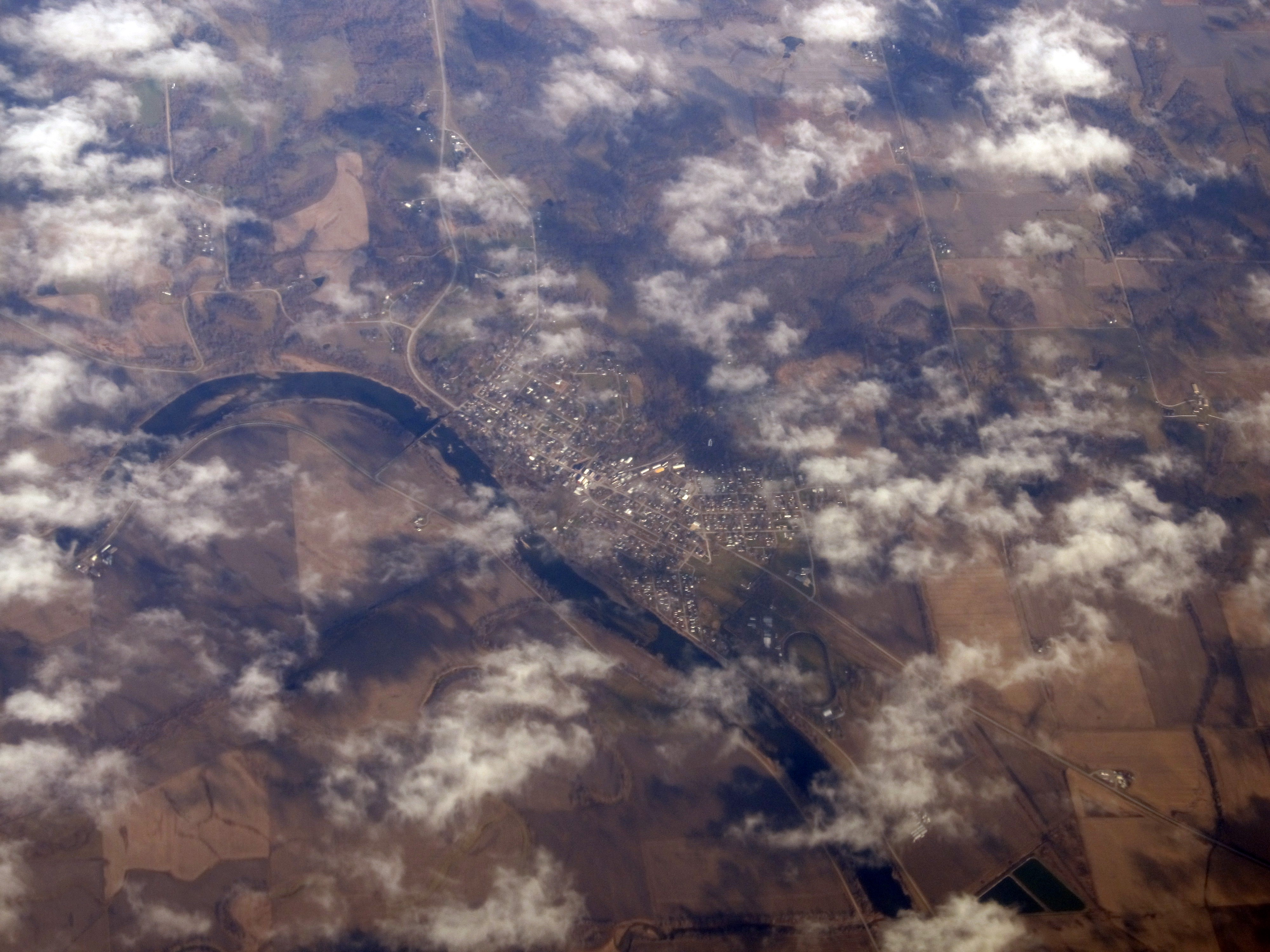
An aerial photo of Eldon from 2013

Eldon is located in the southeast corner of Wapello County eleven miles southeast of Ottumwa on the northeast bank of the Des Moines River across the river from the Soap creek confluence. Iowa Highway 16 passes through the community. The Eldon Water Management Area is across the river in adjacent Davis County two miles to the southwest along Soap Creek.

According to the United States Census Bureau, the city has a total area of 1.12 square miles (2.90 km^{2}), of which 1.11 square miles (2.87 km^{2}) is land and 0.01 square miles (0.03 km^{2}; 2.59 ha) is water.

== Education ==
Eldon is served by the Cardinal Community School District which has its campus 2.5 miles north of the town in rural Wapello County.

Eldon is consolidated with the towns of Agency, Batavia, and the unincorporated communities of Selma and Bladensburg within the Cardinal Community School District.

Cardinal Schools mascot is the "Comet". The Cardinal athletic teams participate in the South Central Conference.

== Demographics ==
Historical populations
Year	Pop.	±%
1880	729	—
1890	1,725	+136.6%
1900	1,850	+7.2%
1910	2,024	+9.4%
1920	2,091	+3.3%
1930	1,788	−14.5%
1940	1,676	−6.3%
1950	1,457	−13.1%
1960	1,386	−4.9%
1970	1,319	−4.8%
1980	1,255	−4.9%
1990	1,070	−14.7%
2000	998	−6.7%
2010	927	−7.1%
2020	783	−15.5%
Source:"U.S. Census website". United States Census Bureau. and Iowa Data Center; Source: U.S. Decennial Census

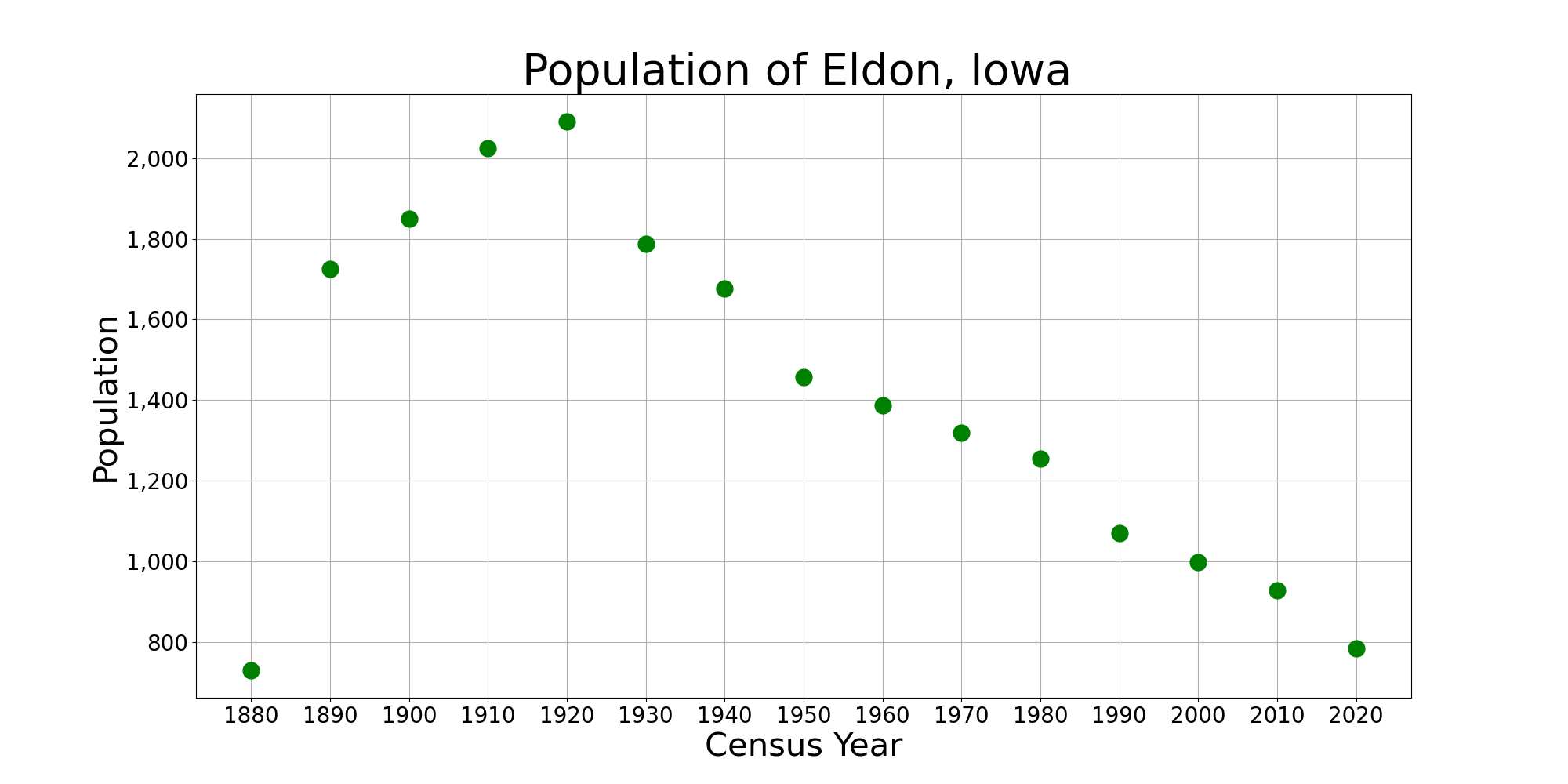
The population of Eldon, Iowa from US census data

=== 2020 census ===
As of the census of 2020, there were 783 people, 361 households, and 210 families residing in the city. The population density was 715.8 inhabitants per square mile (276.4/km^{2}). There were 404 housing units at an average density of 369.3 per square mile (142.6/km^{2}). The racial makeup of the city was 94.4% White, 0.0% Black or African American, 0.1% Native American, 0.0% Asian, 0.1% Pacific Islander, 0.4% from other races and 5.0% from two or more races. Hispanic or Latino persons of any race comprised 3.1% of the population.

Of the 361 households, 26.3% of which had children under the age of 18 living with them, 40.4% were married couples living together, 7.2% were cohabitating couples, 30.7% had a female householder with no spouse or partner present and 21.6% had a male householder with no spouse or partner present. 41.8% of all households were non-families. 37.4% of all households were made up of individuals, 19.4% had someone living alone who was 65 years old or older.

The median age in the city was 45.3 years. 24.3% of the residents were under the age of 20; 4.0% were between the ages of 20 and 24; 21.3% were from 25 and 44; 27.8% were from 45 and 64; and 22.6% were 65 years of age or older. The gender makeup of the city was 48.0% male and 52.0% female.

=== 2010 census ===
At the 2010 census 927 people, 406 households, and 260 families were residing in the city. The population density was 835.1 inhabitants per square mile (322.4/km^{2}). The 448 housing units had an average density of 403.6 per square mile (155.8/km^{2}). The racial makup of the city was 98.4% White, 0.1% African American, 0.2% Native American, 0.3% from other races, and 1.0% from two or more races. Hispanic or Latino of any race were 1.1%.

Of 406 households, 31.8% had children under the age of 18 living with them, 49.5% were married couples living together, 11.3% had a female householder with no husband present, 3.2% had a male householder with no wife present, and 36.0% were non-families. 32.3% of households were made up of individuals, and 15% were one person aged 65 or older. The average household size was 2.28, and the average family size was 2.84.

The median age was 42.3 years old. 24.1% of residents were under the age of 18; 7.3% were between the ages of 18 and 24; 22.8% were from 25 to 44; 26.4% were from 45 to 64; and 19.4% were 65 or older. The gender makeup of the city was 48.7% male and 51.3% female.

=== 2000 census ===
At the 2000 census 998 people, 438 households, and 275 families were residing in the city. The population density was 884.3 inhabitants per square mile (341.4/km^{2}). The 470 housing units had an average density of 416.5 per square mile (160.8/km^{2}). The racial makeup of the city was 98.20% White, 0.40% from other races, and 1.40% from two or more races. Hispanic or Latino of any race were 1.50%.

Of the 438 households 29.2% had children under the age of 18 living with them, 51.1% were married couples living together, 8.0% had a female householder with no husband present, and 37.0% were non-families. 31.7% of households were one person and 18.0% were one person aged 65 or older. The average household size was 2.28 and the average family size was 2.91.

The age distribution was 25.3% under the age of 18, 6.0% from 18 to 24, 27.4% from 25 to 44, 24.2% from 45 to 64, and 17.1% 65 or older. The median age was 39 years. For every 100 females, there were 91.2 males. For every 100 females age 18 and over, there were 92.3 males.

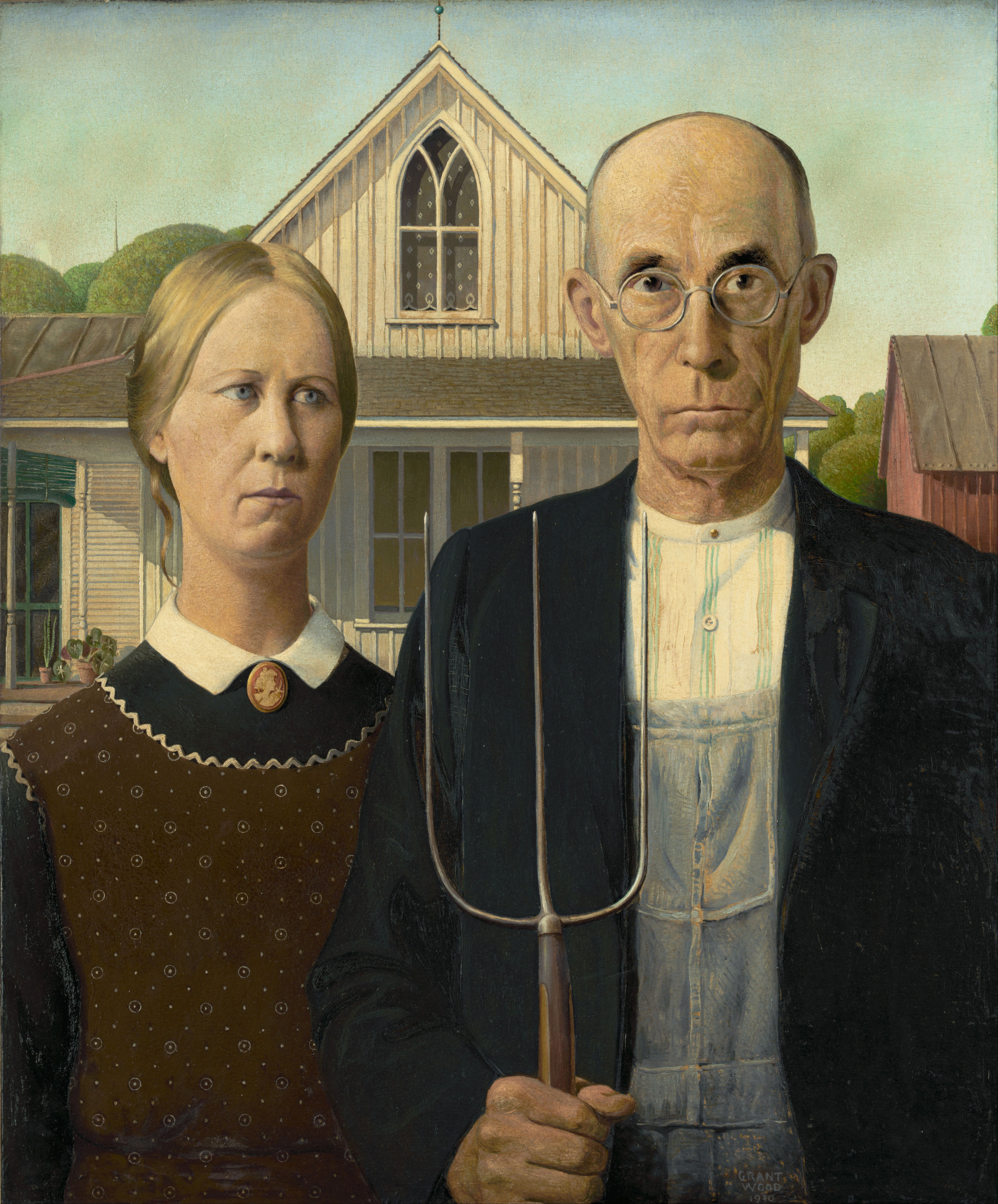
The famous painting American Gothic by Grant Wood

The median household income was $26,950 and the median family income was $37,250. Males had a median income of $29,261 versus $20,573 for females. The per capita income for the city was $14,495. About 11.4% of families and 15.5% of the population were below the poverty line, including 21.0% of those under age 18 and 15.9% of those age 65 or over.

== National Register of Historic Places ==
In addition to the American Gothic House, the following properties are listed on the National Register of Historic Places:

- Big 4 Fair Art Hall
- Eldon Public Library
- McHaffey Opera House
