= Benson Building (Ottumwa, Iowa) =

- Formerly listed on the U.S. National Register of Historic Places
- U.S. Historic district – Contributing property
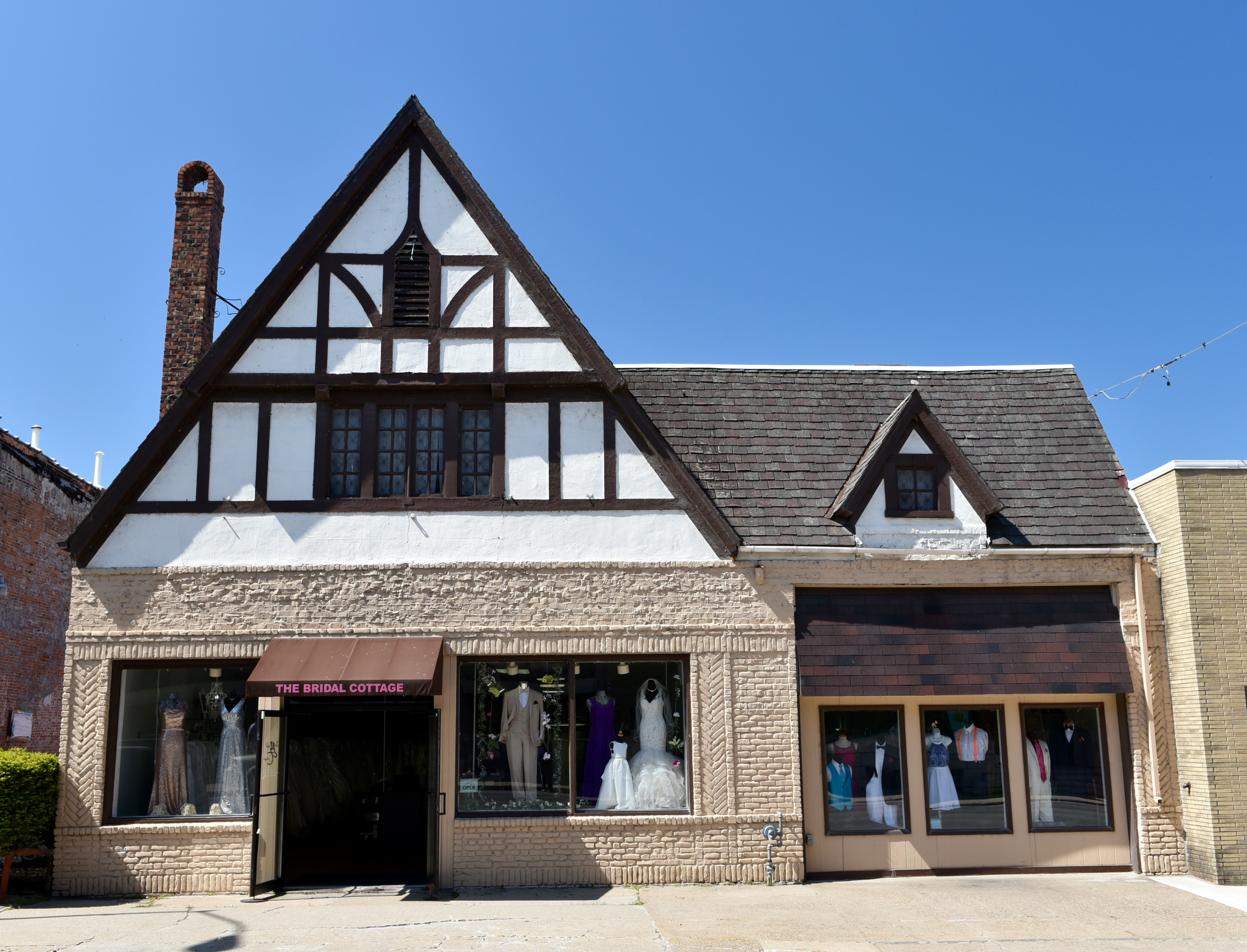

- Location within Iowa Location within the United States
- Location: 214 E. 2nd St. Ottumwa, Iowa
- Coordinates: 41°1′1″N 92°24′37″W
- Area: less than one acre
- Built: 1930
- Architectural style: Tudor Revival
- Part of: Greater Second Street Historic District (ID16000365)
- MPS: Ottumwa MPS
- NRHP reference No.: 95000969

Significant dates
- Added to NRHP: August 11, 1995
- Designated CP: June 24, 2016
- Removed from NRHP: March 7, 2019

The Benson Building, also known as the Union Bus Depot, was an historic building located in downtown Ottumwa, Iowa, United States. The Tudor Revival style commercial building was completed in 1930. The one-story structure was composed of highly textured, painted brick. The façade featured a steeply pitched gable roof and half-timbering. The building was originally used as an indoor miniature golf course. Its significance was attributed to its architecture. It was individually listed on the National Register of Historic Places in 1995 as a part of the Ottumwa MPS. In 2016 it was included as a contributing property in the Greater Second Street Historic District.

On January 6, 2018, the structure caught fire and was destroyed. It was delisted from the National Register of Historic Places in 2019.
