= Big 4 Fair Art Hall =

Historic building in Iowa, United States

- U.S. National Register of Historic Places
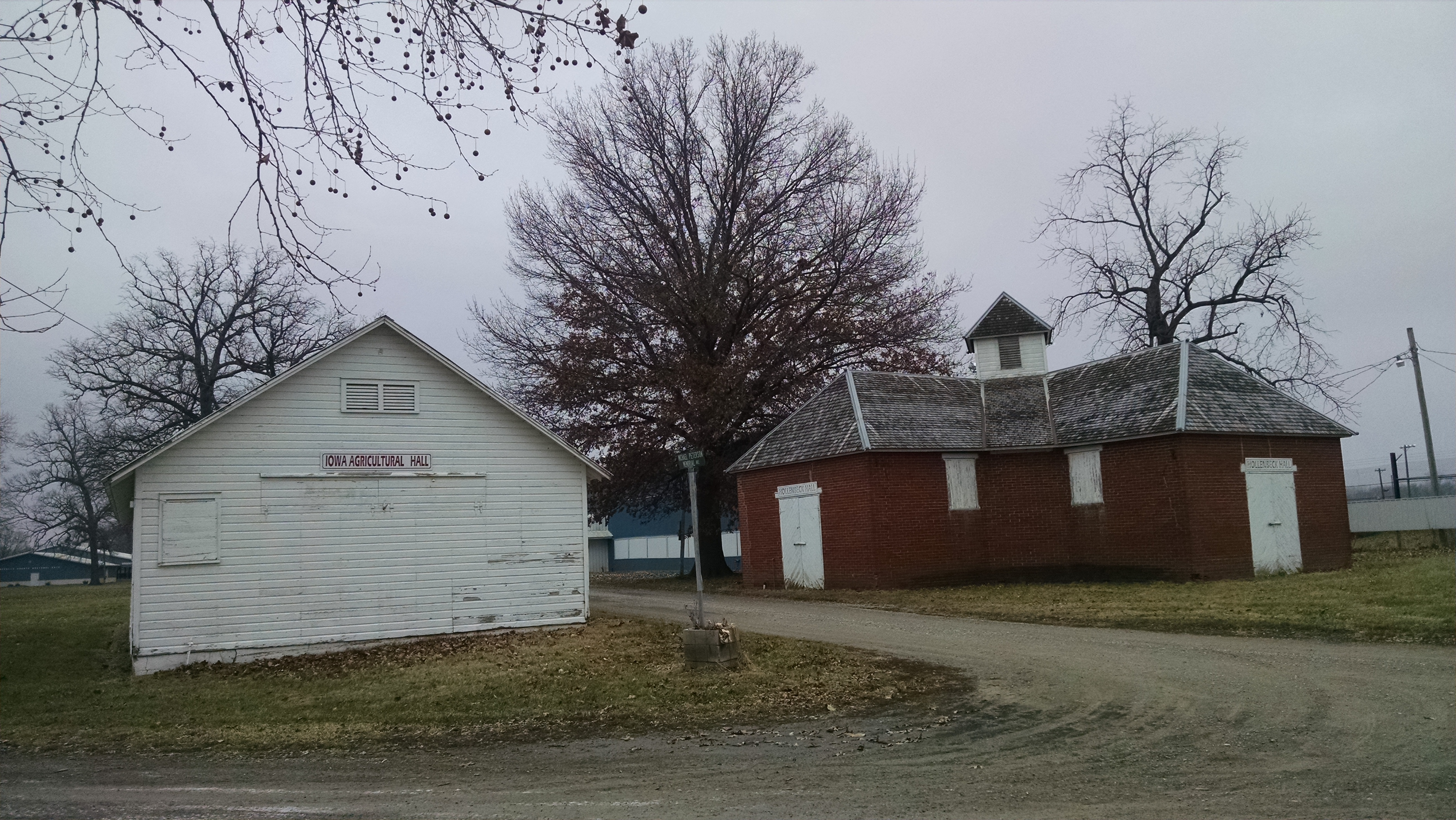
- Big 4 Fair Art Hall, aka Hollenbeck Hall Wapello County Fairgrounds, Eldon Iowa

- Location within Iowa Location within the United States
- Location: Water St. at the Wapello County Regional Fairgrounds, Eldon, Iowa
- Coordinates: 40°54′32.1″N 92°12′54.3″W
- Built: 1911
- NRHP reference No.: 95000621
- Added to NRHP: May 18, 1995

The Big 4 Fair Art Hall, also known as Hollenbeck Hall, is a historic building located in the Wapello County Fairgrounds in Eldon, Iowa, United States. The single-story brick structure was built in 1911, replacing an older building that had been destroyed in a fire. It is thought to be the oldest original brick building on a fairgrounds in the state. The building has four wings that were devoted to the four Iowa counties in the Big 4 Fair Association, Wapello, Davis (South), Jefferson (east), and Van Buren (southeast). People from each county would display their produce, grain, and arts and crafts in their county's wing. During other times of the year, the building was used for meetings and entertainment.

The Big 4 Fair was established in 1891 and folded in 1917. It was reorganized the following year as the Wapello County Agricultural Fair and has subsequently been renamed the Wapello County Regional Fair. The hall was named for Mabel Hollenbeck in 1984. She had served as the Art Hall Superintendent for 40 years. It was listed on the National Register of Historic Places in 1995.
