= J.W. Garner Building =

- U.S. National Register of Historic Places
- U.S. Historic district – Contributing property
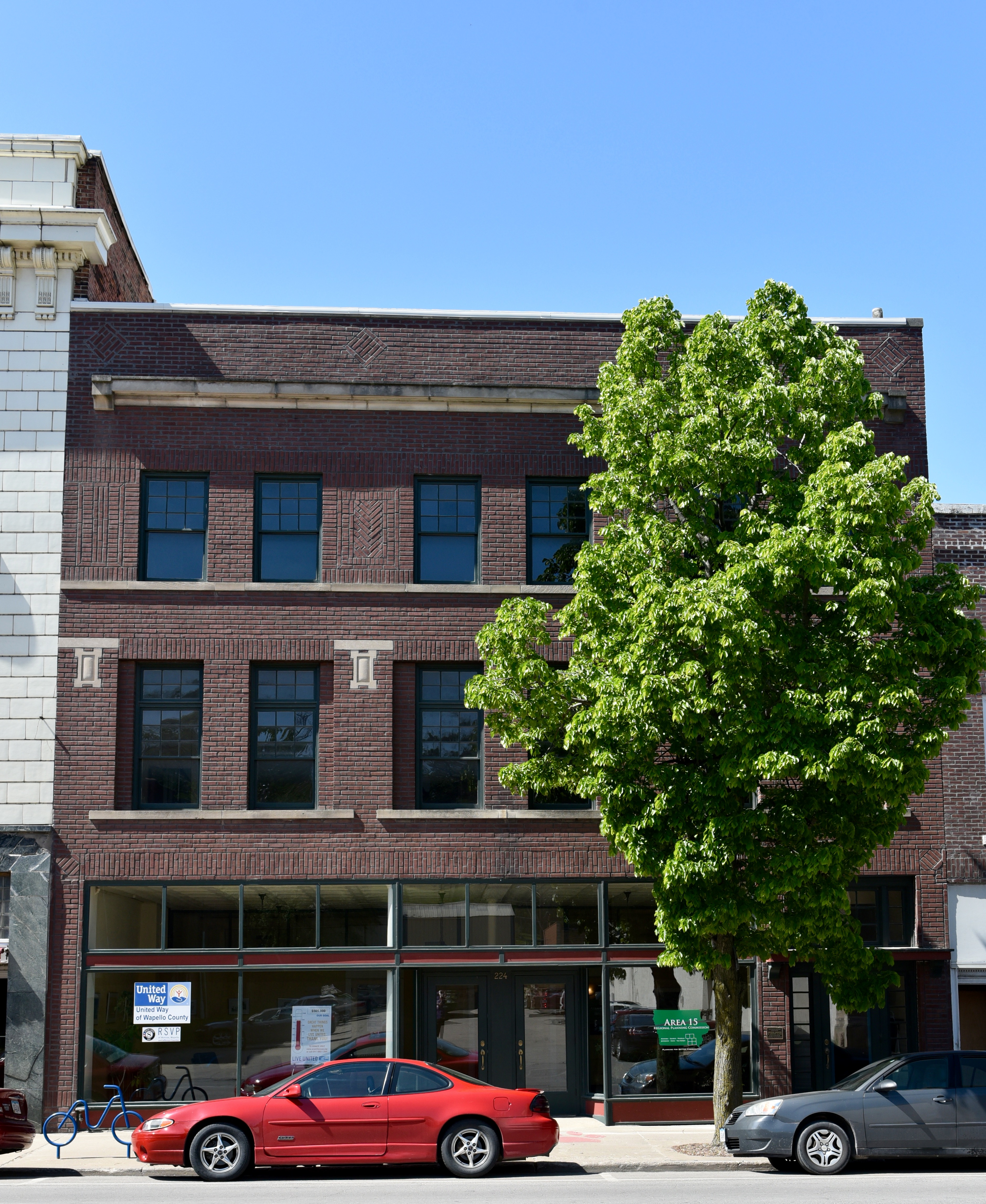

- Location within Iowa Location within the United States
- Location: 222-224 E. 2nd St. Ottumwa, Iowa
- Coordinates: 41°1′8″N 92°24′36″W
- Area: less than one acre
- Built: 1911
- Architect: George M. Kerns
- Architectural style: Classical Revival
- Part of: Greater Second Street Historic District (ID16000365)
- MPS: Ottumwa MPS
- NRHP reference No.: 10000003

Significant dates
- Added to NRHP: February 12, 2010
- Designated CP: June 24, 2016

The J.W. Garner Building is a historic building located in Ottumwa, Iowa, United States. Built in 1911, it is the work of local architect George M. Kerns. The three-story red brick structure with limestone details exhibits a subdued Neoclassical style. The windows on the second floor are grouped into bays divided by brick pilasters with two windows per bay. The third floor windows have no such division and have a limestone belt course for their sills. There is a simple cornice near the top of the facade. The building was individually listed on the National Register of Historic Places in 2010. In 2016 it was included as a contributing property in the Greater Second Street Historic District.
