= Benson Block =

- U.S. National Register of Historic Places
- U.S. Historic district – Contributing property
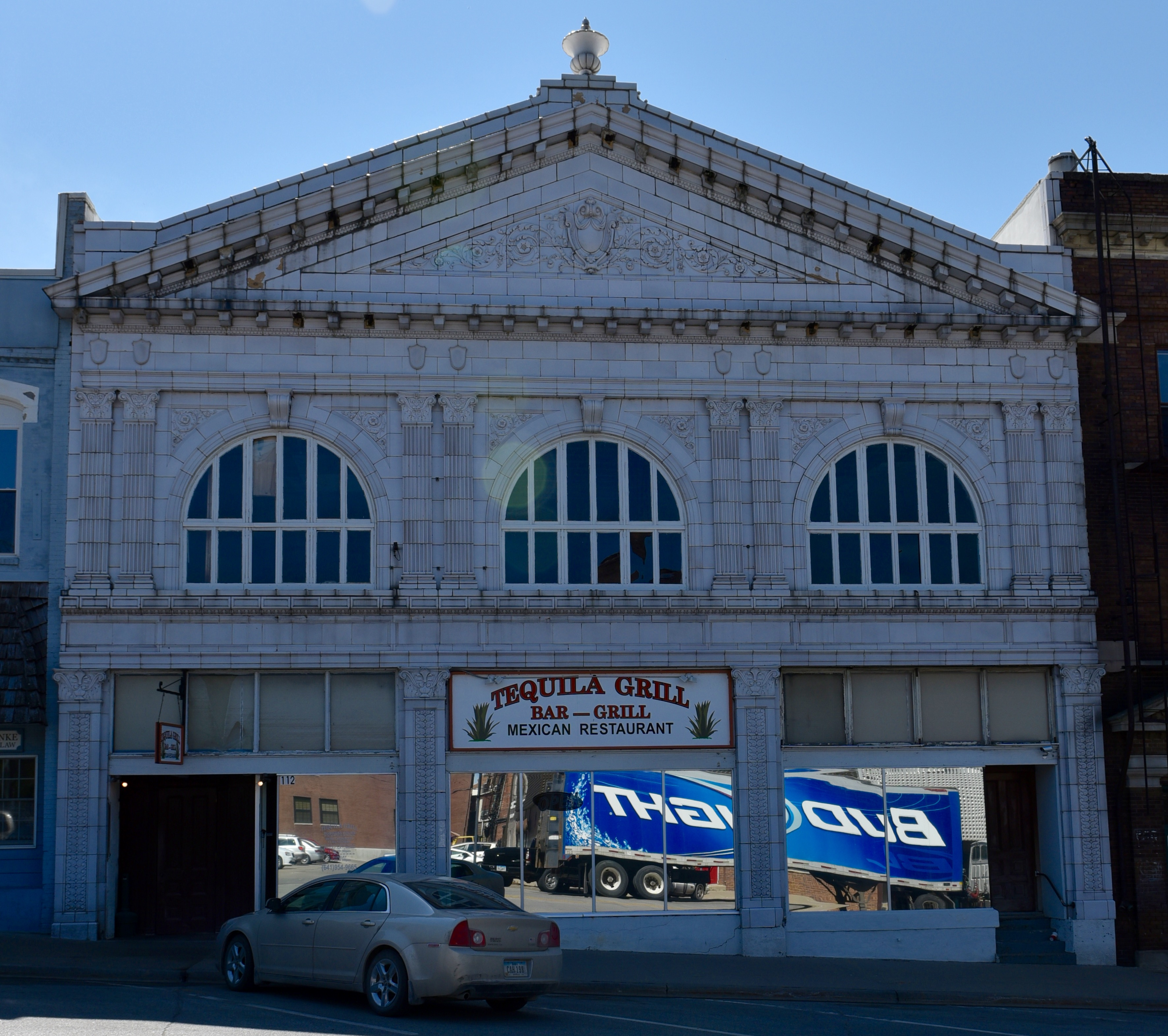

- Location within Iowa Location within the United States
- Location: 109-112 N. Market; Ottumwa, Iowa
- Coordinates: 41°1′3″N 92°24′35″W
- Area: less than one acre
- Built: 1924
- Architectural style: Classical Revival
- Part of: Greater Second Street Historic District (ID16000365)
- NRHP reference No.: 85000009

Significant dates
- Added to NRHP: January 3, 1985
- Designated CP: June 24, 2016

The Benson Block is a historic building located in downtown Ottumwa, Iowa, United States. It is two-fifths of a building that was originally constructed in 1883 and was damaged in a fire in 1923. This part of the building was re-constructed as a theatre, but because it lacked a sufficient number of exits, was never used for that purpose. It is noteworthy for the decorative Neoclassical white terra cotta cladding on the façade, which enabled its owners to transform its original appearance. The building was listed on the National Register of Historic Places in 1985. In 2016, it was included as a contributing property in the Greater Second Street Historic District.
