= McHaffey Opera House =

- U.S. National Register of Historic Places
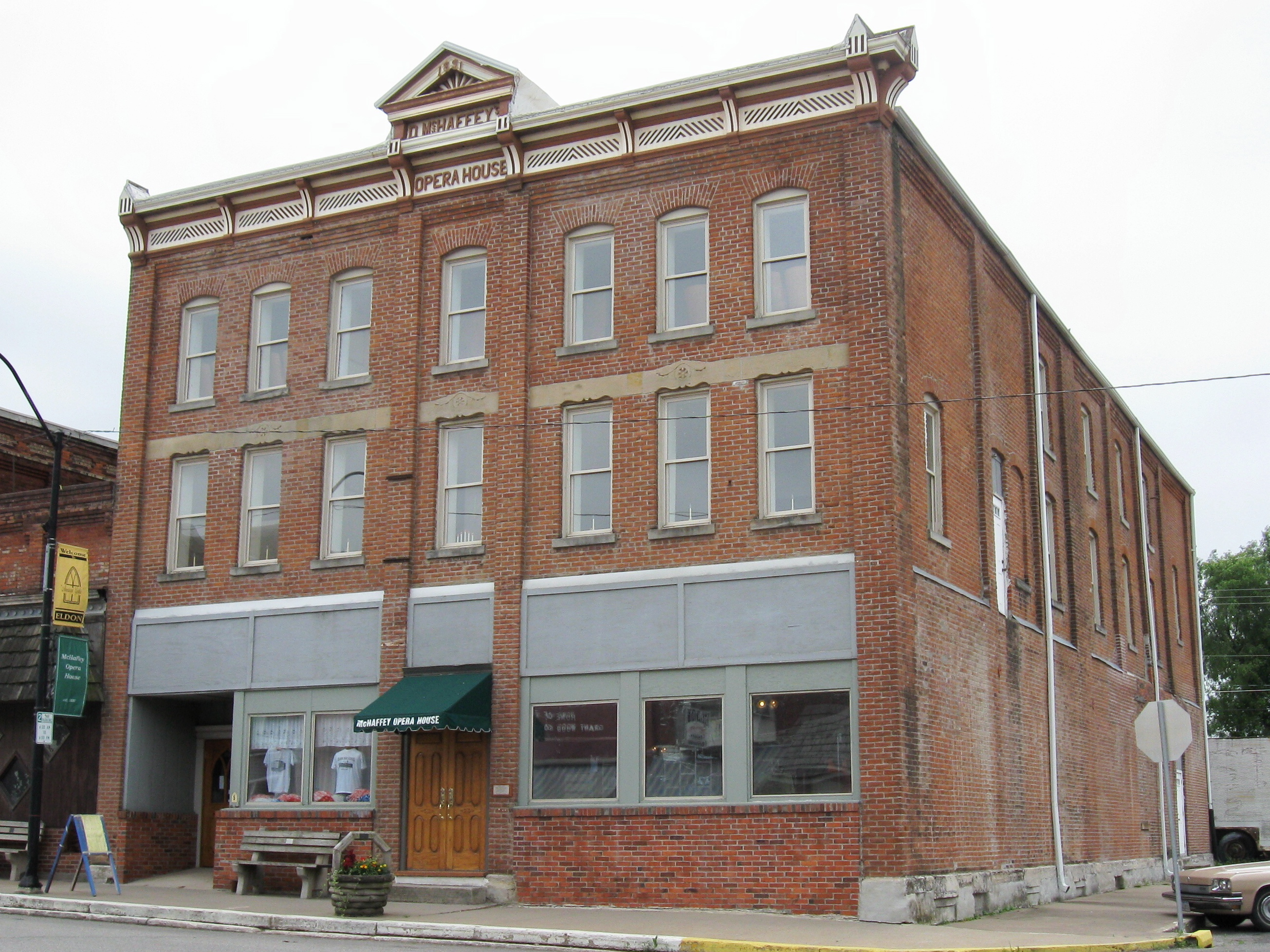

- Location within Iowa Location within the United States
- Location: 414 Elm St. Eldon, Iowa
- Coordinates: 40°55′4″N 92°13′22″W
- Area: less than one acre
- Built: 1891
- Architectural style: Late 19th and 20th Century Revivals
- NRHP reference No.: 95001317
- Added to NRHP: November 22, 1995

The McHaffey Opera House is a historic building located in Eldon, Iowa, United States. It was constructed in 1891 and in use by the community through the 1940s. The building was mainly unused for many decades until a volunteer community group bought the opera house in 1995 and began restoration efforts. The McHaffey Opera House was placed on the National Register of Historic Places in November, 1995.

== History ==
Irish immigrant David McHaffey was the proprietor of a brickyard in Eldon when, in 1891, he constructed the opera house using bricks from his business. With Eldon being on a main line of the Chicago, Rock Island and Pacific Railroad, the McHaffey Opera House was able to secure a place on the "New York Circuit", bringing in traveling theatre troupes presenting the latest Broadway plays as well as Shakespearean classics, and vaudeville acts. Other uses included local talent shows, political rallies, and high school graduation ceremonies. For a time, in the early 1900s through the 1920s McHaffey Opera House was even used for basketball games.

With the advent of motion pictures, a projectionist booth was added to the McHaffey to show silent films. As "talkies" came along to enormous popularity in the late 1920s sound capability was added to the Opera House. The last high school graduation ceremony was held at the McHaffey Opera House in 1941. By the 1940s Eldon had another outlet for movies leaving the McHaffey unused for that purpose. However flooding in 1947 damaged the newer theater, granting the Opera House one last chance to briefly show movies. Following that temporary reprieve, the McHaffey Opera House went into a long period of dormancy, seldom used except for storage.

In addition to its significance as an entertainment venue, Dr. S.H. Sawyers the surgeon for the Rock Island Line, had an office on the second floor of the opera house beginning in the 1890s. Other businesses rented space on the main floor of the building. Originally the main floor housed two storefronts before the shared wall was taken down to create a single space. It housed a grocery store and then an auto parts store.

== Rebirth ==
In 1995 a non-profit corporation of community volunteers formed to save and restore the McHaffey to usefulness after it sat vacant for nearly five decades. The restoration has been funded by some grants but largely by community efforts such as a thrift shop and yearly calendar sales. All of the original flooring has been restored and some of the original seating has been retained. Most of the walls have been renovated and repainted as well. A new heating and air conditioning system has been installed and the roof repaired to prevent further water damage that occurred during the McHaffey's years of disuse. Modern improvements include the installation of a handicap-accessible elevator. A popular annual event in southeast Iowa is the Christmas Tree Wonderland held on the main floor of the McHaffey. Over 75 festive decorated trees are on display through the holiday season. The next phase of the restoration involves painting the walls that flank the main stage. Eventual plans are to bring back live theater performances and also establish a museum in a portion of the building. The stage came to life once again on the evening of May 14, 2013 with the Cardinal Community School Districts "Parade of Bands" featuring the 5th grade, Middle School and High School Bands. A crowd of over two hundred filled the theater for the performances. The event was also financially beneficial to the McHaffey as Cardinal school employees donated $300 for continued restoration efforts.
