= Eldon Public Library =

- Eldon Carnegie Public Library
- U.S. National Register of Historic Places
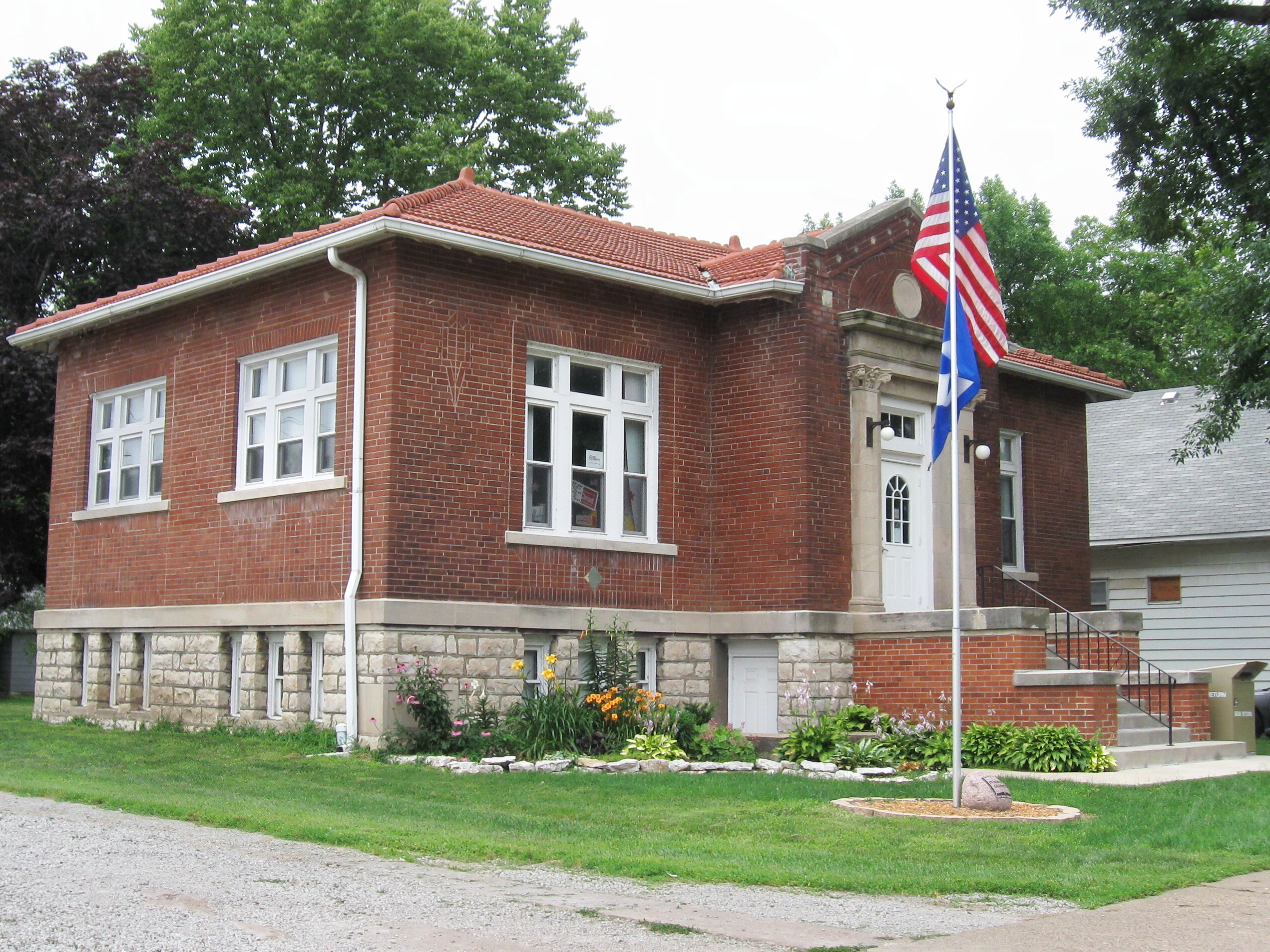

- Location within Iowa Location within the United States
- Location: 608 W. Elm St. Eldon, Iowa
- Coordinates: 40°55′12″N 92°13′32″W
- Area: less than one acre
- Built: 1913
- Built by: Guthrie and Hoist
- Architect: Wetherell and Gage
- Architectural style: Classical Revival
- MPS: Public Library Buildings in Iowa TR
- NRHP reference No.: 96000604
- Added to NRHP: May 30, 1996

The Eldon Public Library is a public library and historic building located in Eldon, Iowa, United States. Established in 1906, the present building, completed in 1913 with a donation from Andrew Carnegie, is listed on the National Register of Historic Places.

== History ==
The first library in the town of Eldon was established in a rented room above a local business in 1906. The funds for the project were raised by various women's groups in the city. Two years later it was incorporated according to the laws of the state of Iowa and the town took responsibility for its maintenance. Retta Meyers, president of the library board, contacted Andrew Carnegie in 1911 in hopes that he would make a donation so a permanent building could be built. He donated $7,500 once his specifications were realized. The present site was paid for and the deed delivered on January 1, 1912. The prominent Des Moines architectural firm of Wetherell and Gage designed the Neoclassical style building. Guthrie and Hoist from Albia, Iowa was responsible for construction. The cornerstone was laid on November 23, 1912, and the library was dedicated on May 9, 1913, at Eldon Christian Church. State Senator J.F. Webber from Ottumwa delivered the address. A reception was held in the new library. The building has served the community as a library ever since. It was listed on the National Register of Historic Places in 1996.

== Architecture ==
The library building is a single-story structure built on a raised basement. The exterior is composed of red vitrified tile and rock-faced stone on the basement level. It is capped with a hipped roof that features finials on the ridge and tile flashing. The gabled front entrance projects from the main facade, and pilasters frame the door. Beyond the vestibule, the interior is a single room divided by shelving units in the small library style proposed by James Bertram. There is also a basement vestibule in the back of the building. The two rooms in the basement have served as meeting rooms for various community organizations.
