= Diamond Ridge, Alaska =

Diamond Ridge, Alaska Ch’aqiniggech’
- Census-designated place
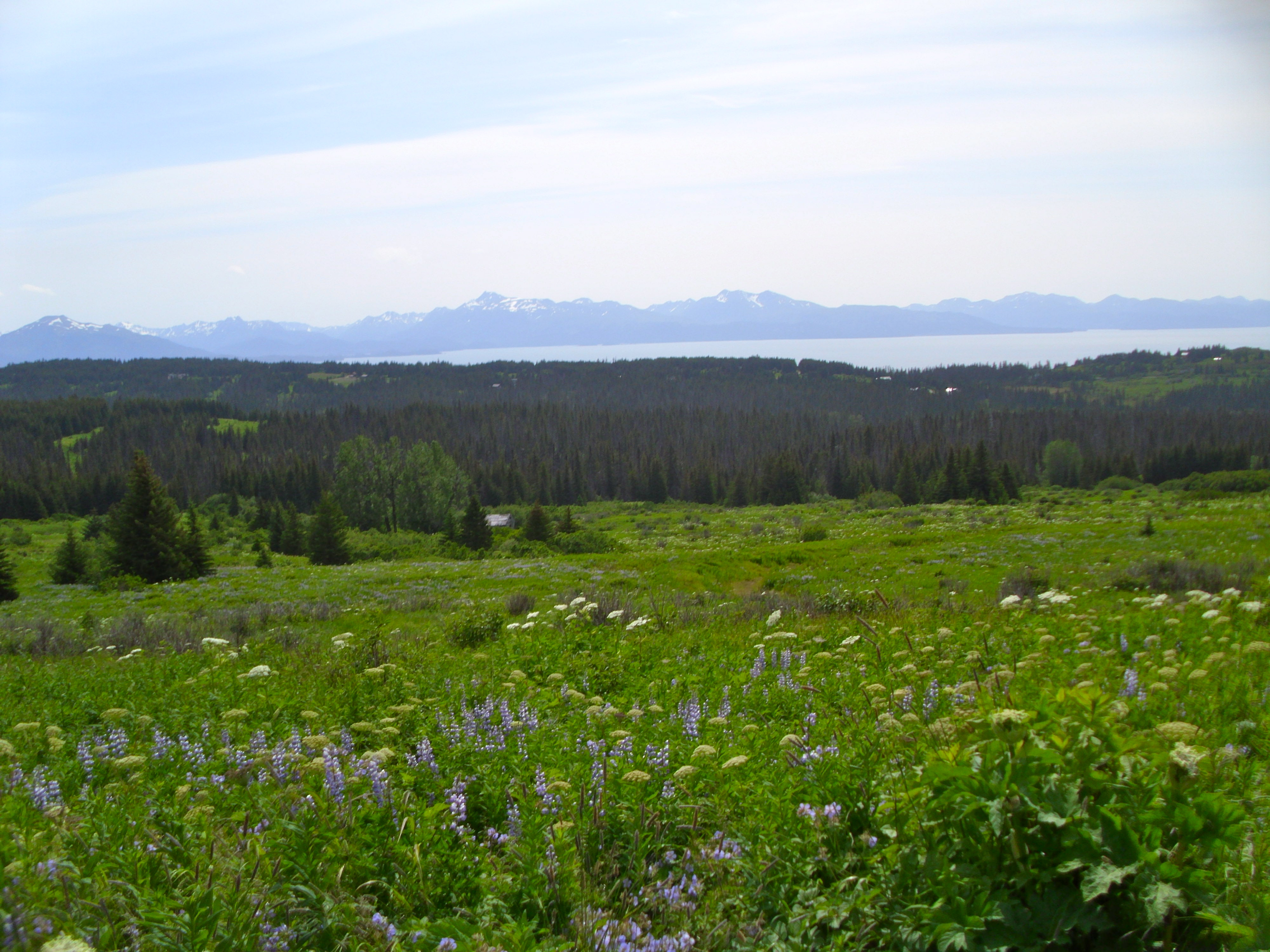
- View from Diamond Ridge on the Homestead Trail, showing Kachemak Bay and the Kenai Mountains

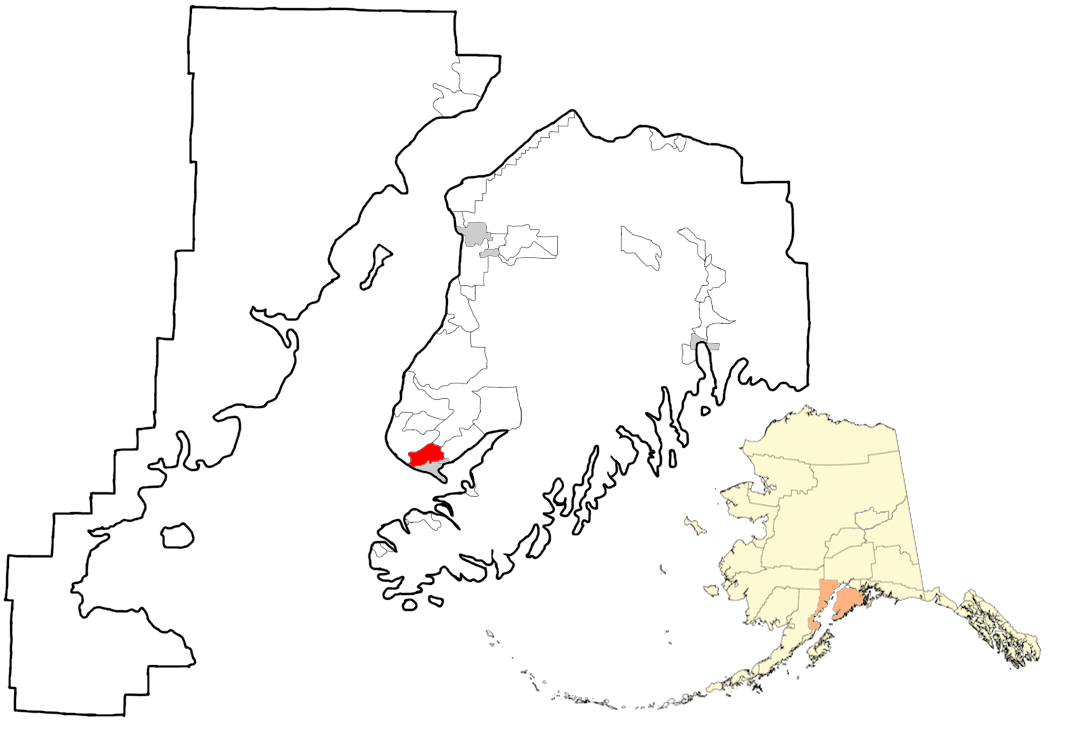
- Location in Kenai Peninsula Borough, Alaska
- Coordinates: 59°39′55″N 151°34′15″W
- Country: United States
- State: Alaska
- Borough: Kenai Peninsula

Government
  - Borough mayor: Peter Micciche
  - State senator: Gary Stevens (R)
  - State rep.: Sarah Vance (R)

Area
  - Total: 42.40 sq mi (109.81 km^{2})
  - Land: 42.40 sq mi (109.81 km^{2})
  - Water: 0 sq mi (0.00 km^{2})
- Elevation: 1,060 ft (323 m)

Population (2020)
  - Total: 1,330
  - Density: 31.4/sq mi (12.11/km^{2})
- Time zone: UTC-9 (Alaska (AKST))
  - Summer (DST): UTC-8 (AKDT)
- Area code: 907
- FIPS code: 02-18925
- GNIS feature ID: 1865549

Diamond Ridge (Dena'ina: Ch’aqiniggech’) is a census-designated place (CDP) just outside Homer in Kenai Peninsula Borough, Alaska, United States. As of the 2020 census, Diamond Ridge had a population of 1,330.

== Geography ==
Diamond Ridge is located at 59°39′55″N 151°34′15″W (59.665391, -151.570826) and is bordered to the south by the city of Homer and to the southeast by the city of Kachemak. To the east is the Fritz Creek CDP, while to the north and west is the Anchor Point CDP. The farthest west part of the Diamond Ridge CDP borders Cook Inlet at the mouth of Kachemak Bay.

The area is named for the high ground, Diamond Ridge, on which it sits. The ridge reaches an elevation of 1,202 feet (366 m) above sea level and is in the southern part of the CDP. Parallel landforms to the north are Crossman Ridge in the center of the CDP and a ridge connecting 1,513-foot (461 m) Ohlson Mountain and 1,622-foot (494 m) Lookout Mountain in the north. The terrain slopes north from the ridges to the Anchor River, which forms the northern boundary of the CDP.

According to the United States Census Bureau, the Diamond Ridge CDP has a total area of 42.4 square miles (109.8 km^{2}), of which 0.004 square miles (0.01 km^{2}), or 0.01%, are water. The main access is via Diamond Ridge Road, which runs across the top of the 5-mile-long (8.0 km) ridge and connects to feeder roads on either side.

== Demographics ==
Historical population
Census	Pop.	Note	%±
2000	1,802		—
2010	1,156		−35.8%
2020	1,330		15.1%
U.S. Decennial Census

Diamond Ridge first appeared on the 2000 U.S. Census as a census-designated place (CDP).

=== 2020 census ===
As of the 2020 census, Diamond Ridge had a population of 1,330. The median age was 44.2 years. 19.2% of residents were under the age of 18 and 17.7% of residents were 65 years of age or older. For every 100 females there were 104.6 males, and for every 100 females age 18 and over there were 105.7 males age 18 and over.

0.0% of residents lived in urban areas, while 100.0% lived in rural areas.

There were 583 households in Diamond Ridge, of which 26.1% had children under the age of 18 living in them. Of all households, 54.4% were married-couple households, 21.6% were households with a male householder and no spouse or partner present, and 16.0% were households with a female householder and no spouse or partner present. About 29.0% of all households were made up of individuals and 9.2% had someone living alone who was 65 years of age or older.

There were 701 housing units, of which 16.8% were vacant. The homeowner vacancy rate was 1.7% and the rental vacancy rate was 6.0%.

Racial composition as of the 2020 census
Race	Number	Percent
White	1,139	85.6%
Black or African American	4	0.3%
American Indian and Alaska Native	36	2.7%
Asian	8	0.6%
Native Hawaiian and Other Pacific Islander	0	0.0%
Some other race	14	1.1%
Two or more races	129	9.7%
Hispanic or Latino (of any race)	31	2.3%

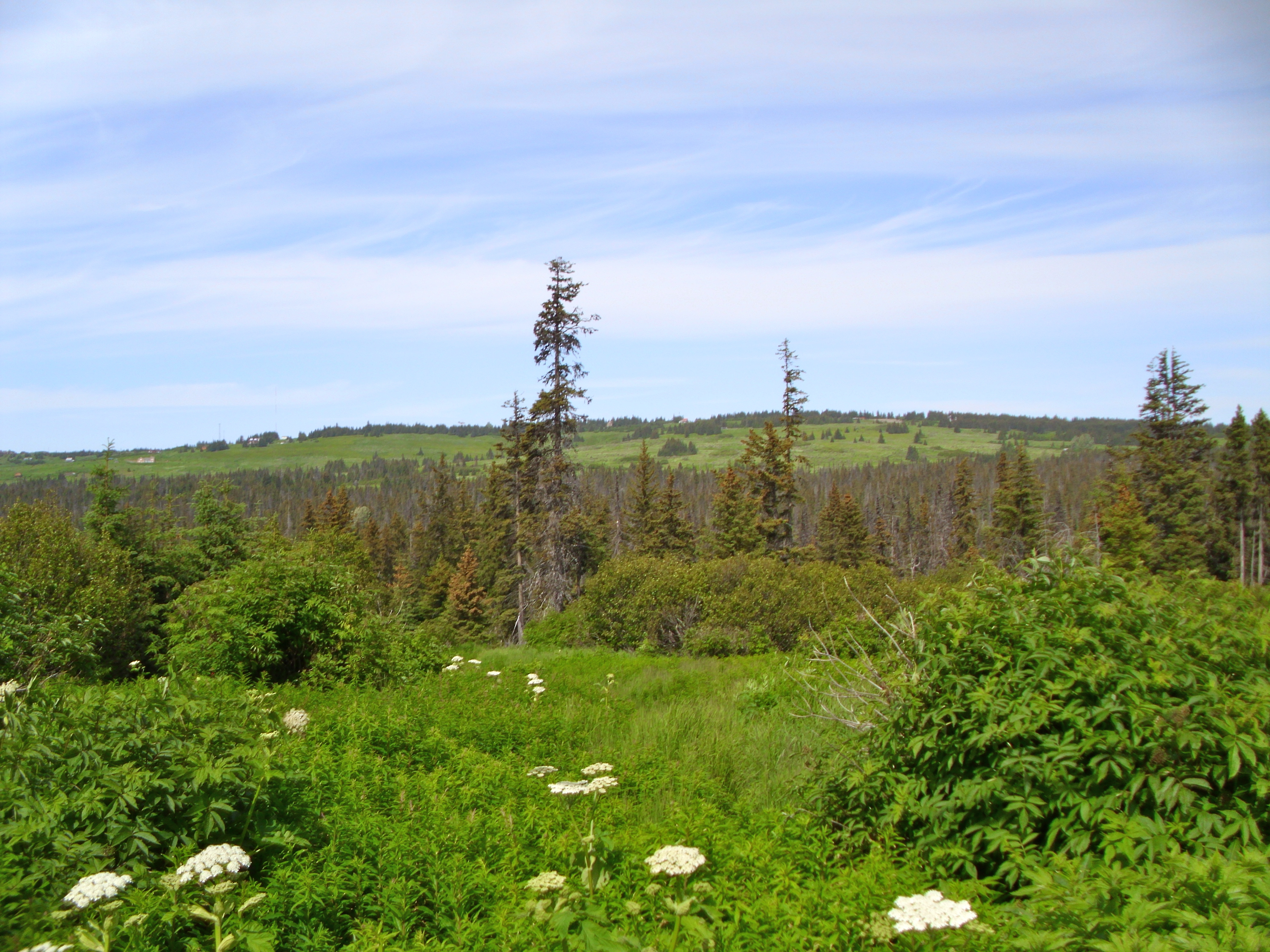
Diamond Ridge seen from the Homer city limit on Roger's Loop Road

=== 2000 census ===
As of the 2000 census, there were 1,802 people, 683 households, and 471 families residing in the CDP. The population density was 37.8 inhabitants per square mile (14.6/km^{2}). There were 850 housing units at an average density of 17.8 units per square mile (6.9 units/km^{2}). The racial makeup of the CDP was 92.29% White, 0.11% Black or African American, 3.16% Native American, 0.44% Asian, 0.89% from other races, and 3.11% from two or more races. 2.11% of the population were Hispanic or Latino of any race.

There were 683 households, out of which 38.9% had children under the age of 18 living with them, 60.0% were married couples living together, 5.7% had a female householder with no husband present, and 31.0% were non-families. 24.0% of all households were made up of individuals, and 3.2% had someone living alone who was 65 years of age or older. The average household size was 2.60 and the average family size was 3.15.

In the CDP, the population was spread out, with 29.7% under the age of 18, 5.3% from 18 to 24, 30.5% from 25 to 44, 28.6% from 45 to 64, and 5.9% who were 65 years of age or older. The median age was 38 years. For every 100 females, there were 101.6 males. For every 100 females age 18 and over, there were 104.9 males.

The median income for a household in the CDP was $50,977, and the median income for a family was $61,813. Males had a median income of $51,964 versus $26,548 for females. The per capita income for the CDP was $23,864. About 7.9% of families and 7.9% of the population were below the poverty line, including 9.2% of those under age 18 and 4.8% of those age 65 or over.

== Parks and trails ==
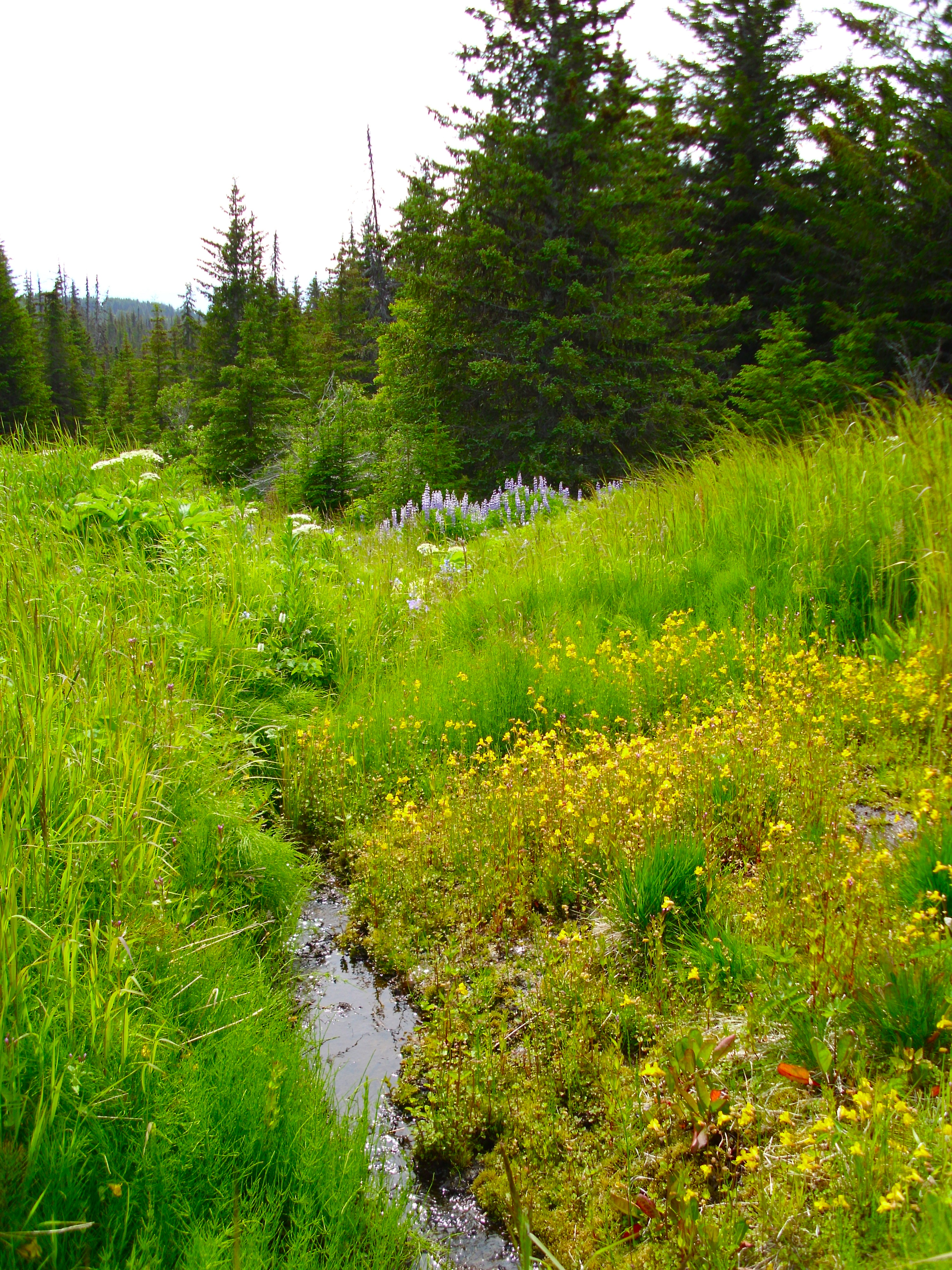
The Homer Demonstration Forest

Diamond Ridge is home to two park areas with trail systems. One is the Homer Demonstration Forest, a preserve on the slopes just below the actual ridge itself. It contains an arboretum, self-guided nature trails, and is one end of the Homestead Trail which crosses the demonstration forest, climbs up Diamond Ridge and across a deep valley to Crossman Ridge, eventually ending at the Homer Reservoir. In winter months there are extensive groomed trails for cross-country skiing, as well as a snowshoe trail.

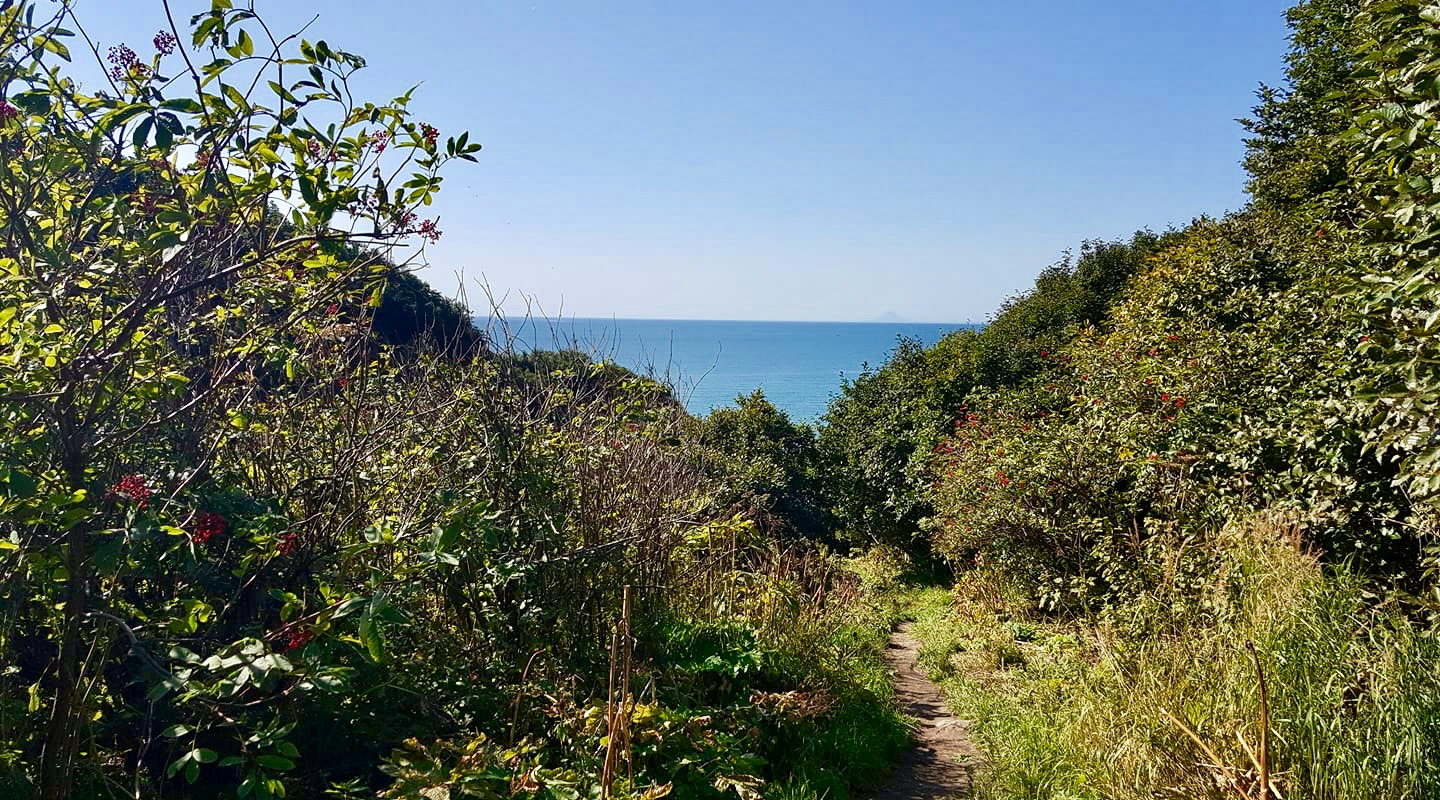
The Diamond Creek Trail follows a deep ravine to the beach near where Kachemak Bay meets Cook Inlet.

The other park in the area is the Diamond Creek State Recreation Area. This is a newer unit of Alaska State Parks and has little development. It is day-use only, camping is not permitted, and the access road is steep and extremely rough in places; vehicles over 25 feet (7.6 m) are not permitted on the lower part of the road. The road leads to several parking areas for access to hiking and biking trails. The bike trails are constructed and maintained by a local cycling club.
