= Fritz Creek, Alaska =

- Census-designated place
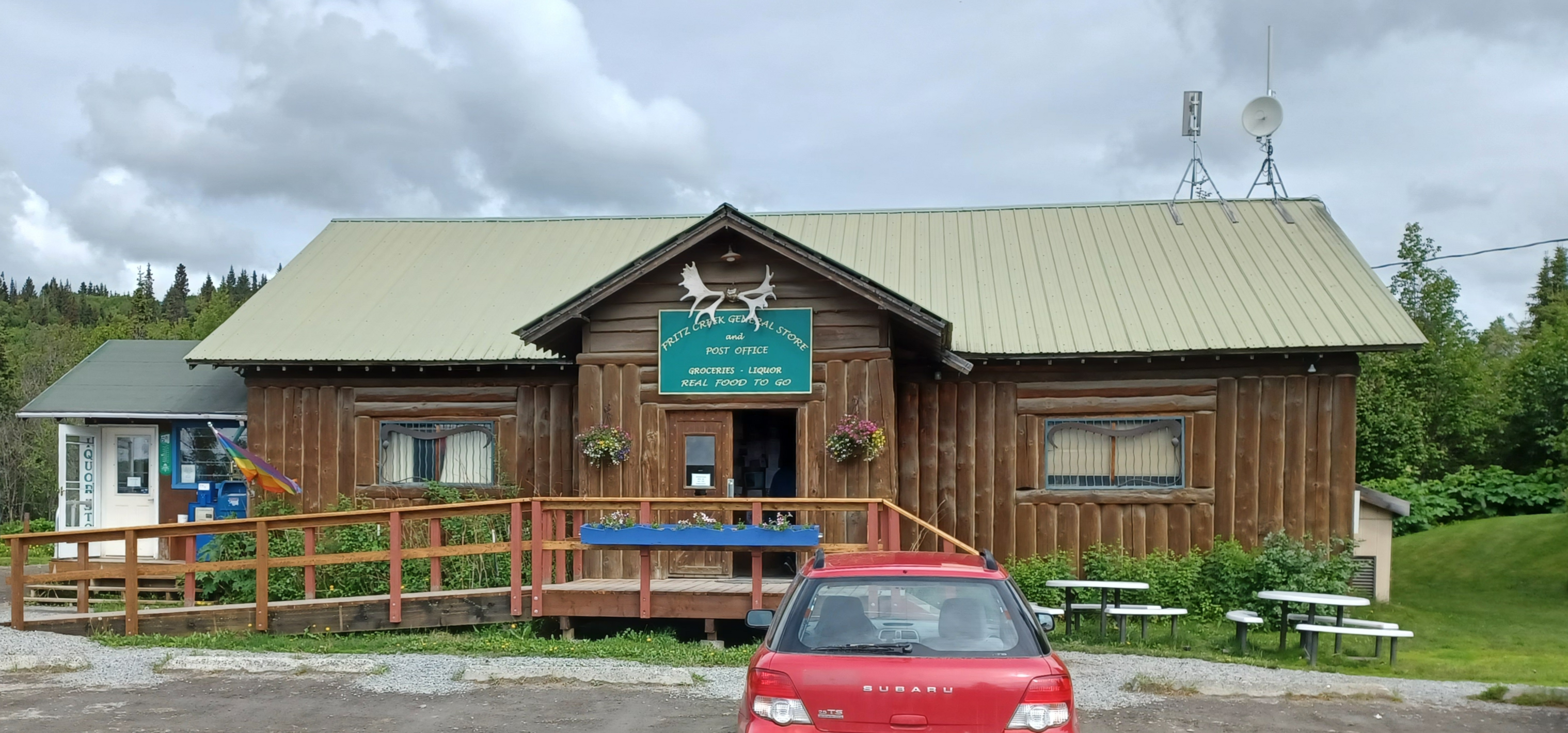
- Fritz Creek General Store and Post Office

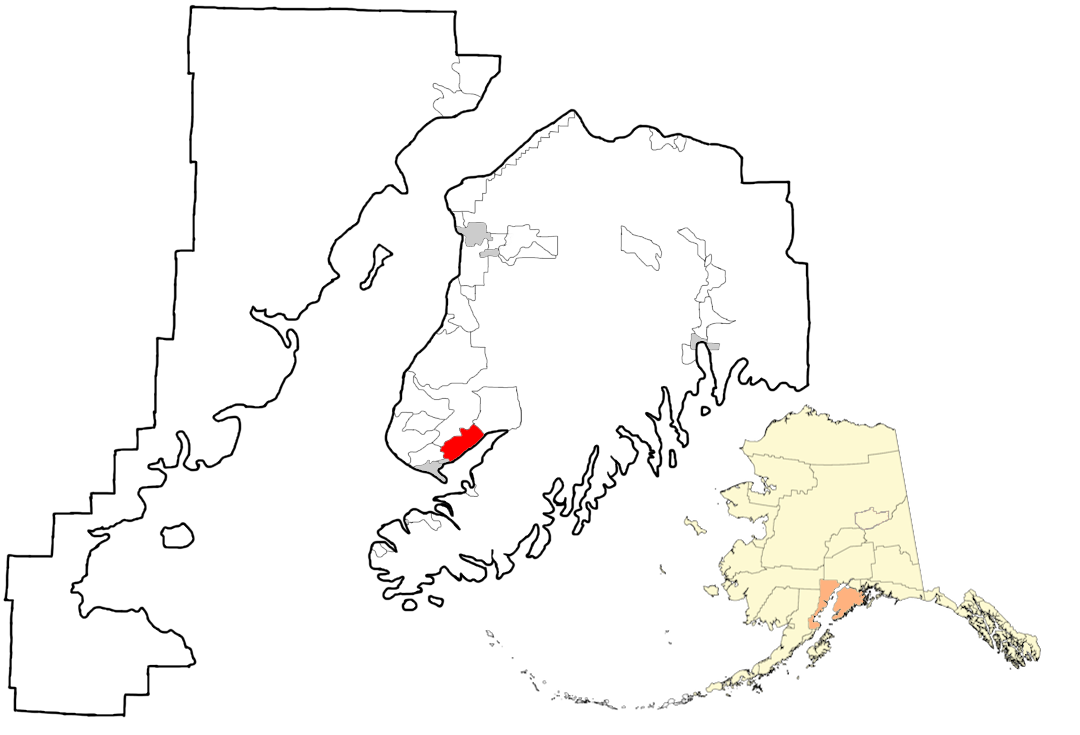
- Location in Kenai Peninsula Borough, Alaska
- Coordinates: 59°43′54″N 151°15′2″W
- Country: United States
- State: Alaska
- Borough: Kenai Peninsula

Government
  - Borough mayor: Peter Micciche
  - State senator: Gary Stevens (R)
  - State rep.: Sarah Vance (R)

Area
  - Total: 53.95 sq mi (139.74 km^{2})
  - Land: 53.95 sq mi (139.74 km^{2})
  - Water: 0 sq mi (0.00 km^{2})
- Elevation: 1,198 ft (365 m)

Population (2020)
  - Total: 2,248
  - Density: 41.7/sq mi (16.09/km^{2})
- Time zone: UTC-9 (Alaska (AKST))
  - Summer (DST): UTC-8 (AKDT)
- ZIP code: 99603
- Area code: 907
- FIPS code: 02-27090
- GNIS feature ID: 1866947

Fritz Creek is a census-designated place (CDP) in the Kenai Peninsula Borough, Alaska, United States, northeast of Homer. At the 2020 census the population was 2,248, up from 1,932 in 2010.

== Fritz Creek Community center and general store ==
In 1954, two acres of private land were designated by a local family for a Fritz Creek Civic and Social Center, intended to be an alternative to the rowdy bar scene in nearby Homer. A large stockade-style log building was built to house the center. Community events such as square dances were held in the building for years. The center was damaged by the 1964 Alaska earthquake and required major repairs to the foundation. Over time the building became less of a community center and was largely rented out for events.

In 1982 the property was sold and the building was converted into a general store and gas station, with a post office being added in 1983. Hot food and a small dining area were added later and the store returned to being something of a gathering spot for the surrounding community. Eventually a liqour store was added as well. In 2019, the store was told by the Alaska Department of Environmental Conservation that Stormy, a cat that had lived in the store for years, was in violation of state law and would need to be removed. Stormy was rehomed with a local resident. The building changed hands several more times before being badly damaged in a fire in July 2023. The cause of the fire is not known. It was reopened under new management in April 2025

== Geography ==
Fritz Creek is located at 59°43′54″N 151°15′02″W, covering an area 6 to 20 miles (10 to 32 km) northeast of Homer. It sits on the north side of Kachemak Bay and is bordered to the southwest by the city of Kachemak, to the west by the Diamond Ridge CDP, and to the northeast by the Fox River CDP.

According to the United States Census Bureau, the CDP has a total area of 54.0 square miles (139.9 km^{2}), all of it recorded as land.

Climbing from sea level to over 1,500 feet (460 m), Fritz Creek offers views of the Kenai Mountains and Kachemak Bay.

== Demographics ==
Historical population
Census	Pop.	Note	%±
1970	27		—
1980	302		1,018.5%
1990	1,426		372.2%
2000	1,603		12.4%
2010	1,932		20.5%
2020	2,248		16.4%
U.S. Decennial Census

Fritz Creek first appeared on the 1970 U.S. Census as an unincorporated village. In 1980 it was made a census-designated place (CDP).

=== 2020 census ===
As of the 2020 census, Fritz Creek had a population of 2,248. The median age was 44.1 years. 19.0% of residents were under the age of 18 and 20.1% of residents were 65 years of age or older. For every 100 females there were 114.9 males, and for every 100 females age 18 and over there were 113.0 males age 18 and over.

0.0% of residents lived in urban areas, while 100.0% lived in rural areas.

There were 969 households in Fritz Creek, of which 26.3% had children under the age of 18 living in them. Of all households, 58.9% were married-couple households, 19.7% were households with a male householder and no spouse or partner present, and 15.3% were households with a female householder and no spouse or partner present. About 24.7% of all households were made up of individuals and 10.3% had someone living alone who was 65 years of age or older.

There were 1,249 housing units, of which 22.4% were vacant. The homeowner vacancy rate was 0.8% and the rental vacancy rate was 13.4%.

Racial composition as of the 2020 census
Race	Number	Percent
White	1,967	87.5%
Black or African American	1	0.0%
American Indian and Alaska Native	52	2.3%
Asian	21	0.9%
Native Hawaiian and Other Pacific Islander	4	0.2%
Some other race	26	1.2%
Two or more races	177	7.9%
Hispanic or Latino (of any race)	54	2.4%

=== 2000 census ===
As of the census of 2000, there were 1,603 people, 661 households, and 413 families residing in the CDP. The population density was 29.5 inhabitants per square mile (11.4/km^{2}). There were 854 housing units at an average density of 15.7 per square mile (6.1/km^{2}). The racial makeup of the CDP was 93.0% White, 0.2% Black or African American, 2.4% Native American, 0.6% Asian, 0.9% from other races, and 3.1% from two or more races. 2.3% of the population were Hispanic or Latino of any race.

There were 661 households, out of which 36.0% had children under the age of 18 living with them, 52.3% were married couples living together, 7.0% had a female householder with no husband present, and 37.4% were non-families. 29.7% of all households were made up of individuals, and 3.0% had someone living alone who was 65 years of age or older. The average household size was 2.43 and the average family size was 3.06.

In the CDP, the population was spread out, with 29.8% under the age of 18, 4.4% from 18 to 24, 30.4% from 25 to 44, 29.8% from 45 to 64, and 5.6% who were 65 years of age or older. The median age was 38 years. For every 100 females, there were 103.7 males. For every 100 females age 18 and over, there were 109.1 males.

The median income for a household in the CDP was $41,400, and the median income for a family was $49,881. Males had a median income of $42,083 versus $31,250 for females. The per capita income for the CDP was $18,937. About 3.6% of families and 9.6% of the population were below the poverty line, including 11.4% of those under age 18 and 3.4% of those age 65 or over.

== See also ==
- Alaska: The Last Frontier
