= Fox River, Alaska =

- Census-designated place
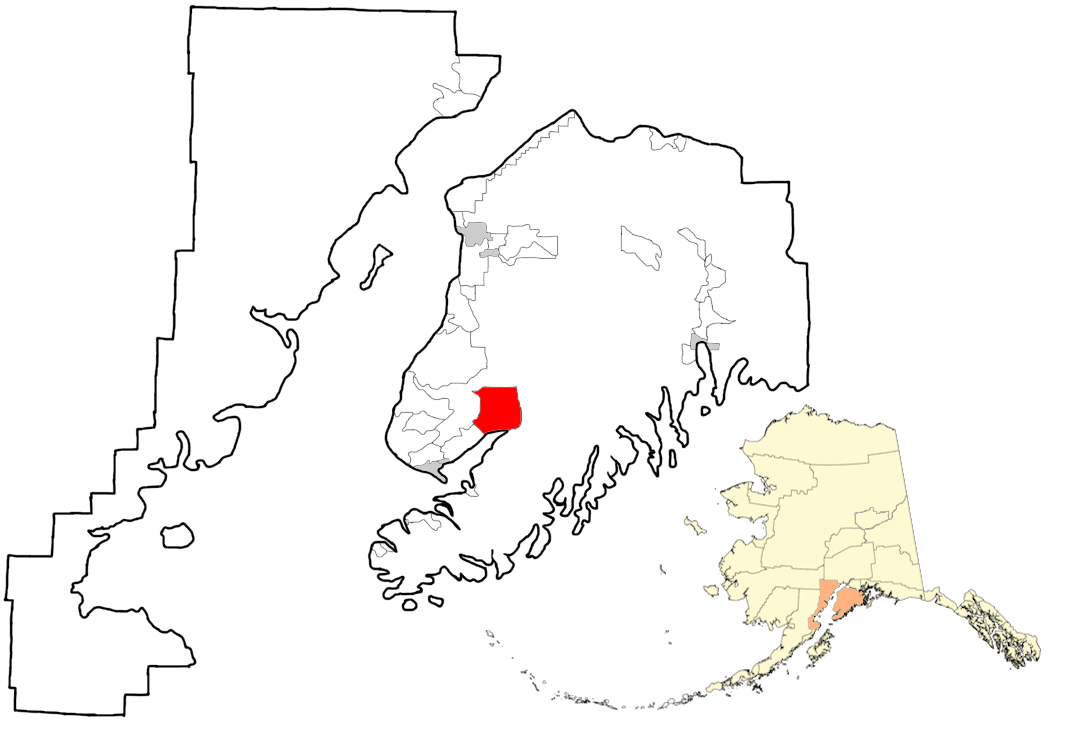
- Location in Kenai Peninsula Borough, Alaska
- Coordinates: 59°50′51″N 150°55′34″W
- Country: United States
- State: Alaska
- Borough: Kenai Peninsula

Government
  - Borough mayor: Peter Micciche
  - State senator: Gary Stevens (R)
  - State rep.: Sarah Vance (R)

Area
  - Total: 128.27 sq mi (332.23 km^{2})
  - Land: 125.39 sq mi (324.76 km^{2})
  - Water: 2.88 sq mi (7.47 km^{2})
- Elevation: 520 ft (160 m)

Population (2020)
  - Total: 644
  - Density: 5.1/sq mi (1.98/km^{2})
- Time zone: UTC-9 (Alaska (AKST))
  - Summer (DST): UTC-8 (AKDT)
- ZIP code: 99603
- Area code: 907
- FIPS code: 02-26910
- GNIS feature ID: 1866945

Fox River (Russian: Фокс-Ривер) is a census-designated place (CDP) in Kenai Peninsula Borough, Alaska, United States. As of the 2020 census, Fox River had a population of 644. It was first reported by the U.S. Geological Survey in 1895. The Fox River, which flows by the CDP, might have been named for Theodore Fox, a local mining magnate.

== Geography ==
Fox River is located on the western side of the Kenai Peninsula at 59°50′51″N 150°55′34″W (59.847372, -150.926178). It is at the head of Kachemak Bay, where the Fox River enters it. The CDP extends north from the bay to high ground north of Caribou Lake. It is bordered to the southwest by Falls Creek, which separates the community from the Fritz Creek CDP. Most of the current population of Fox River is in the southwest part of the CDP, on high ground overlooking Falls Creek, Swift Creek, and Moose Creek.

According to the United States Census Bureau, the CDP has a total area of 128.3 square miles (332.2 km^{2}), of which 125.4 square miles (324.8 km^{2}) are land and 2.9 square miles (7.5 km^{2}), or 2.25%, are water.

The populated area is known locally as "The Head of the (Kachemak) Bay". Its population resides for the most part in the three Russian Old Believer villages of Voznesenka, Kachemak Selo, and Razdolna. Most of the remainder of the CDP is inside the Kenai National Wildlife Refuge and has no population.

== Demographics ==
Historical population
Census	Pop.	Note	%±
1990	382		—
2000	616		61.3%
2010	685		11.2%
2020	644		−6.0%
U.S. Decennial Census

Fox River first appeared on the 1990 U.S. Census as a census-designated place (CDP).

=== 2020 census ===
As of the 2020 Census, there were 644 people, 176 households, and 354 housing units. The median age of the population is 28.1, with men being 27.4 and women being 28.3. 39.4% of people living here were aged 19 and younger and 11.3% were aged 65 years and older. The racial makeup of Fox River were 95.5% white, 2.6% multiracial, and 0.5% of other races, all of Non-Hispanic origin. 1.4% were Hispanic or Latino. The most commonly reported ancestries were Russian (57%), English (5.4%), and German (3.6%).

=== 2000 census ===
As of the census of 2000, there were 616 people, 122 households, and 103 families residing in the CDP. The population density was 4.9 inhabitants per square mile (1.9/km^{2}). There were 170 housing units at an average density of 1.3 per square mile (0.50/km^{2}). The racial makeup of the CDP was 99.68% White, 0.16% from other races, and 0.16% from two or more races. 0.16% of the population were Hispanic or Latino of any race.

There were 122 households, out of which 73.0% had children under the age of 18 living with them, 81.1% were married couples living together, 4.1% had a female householder with no husband present, and 14.8% were non-families. 13.1% of all households were made up of individuals, and 7.4% had someone living alone who was 65 years of age or older. The average household size was 5.05 and the average family size was 5.73.

In the CDP, the population was spread out, with 58.0% under the age of 18, 12.0% from 18 to 24, 17.0% from 25 to 44, 9.6% from 45 to 64, and 3.4% who were 65 years of age or older. The median age was 15 years. For every 100 females, there were 116.1 males. For every 100 females age 18 and over, there were 108.9 males.

The median income for a household in the CDP was $26,964, and the median income for a family was $40,938. Males had a median income of $39,063 versus $16,875 for females. The per capita income for the CDP was $7,963. About 29.5% of families and 33.8% of the population were below the poverty line, including 35.9% of those under age 18 and 22.2% of those age 65 or over.

Fox River has the highest percentage of people of Russian ancestry (80.9%) in the United States.
