= Brent Johnson (politician) =

American politician

Member-elect of the Alaska House of Representatives from the 6th district
- Assuming office January 2027
- Succeeding: Sarah Vance

Member of the Kenai Peninsula Borough Assembly
- In office 2010–2016
- In office 2019–2025

Personal details
- Born: 1955 Seldovia, Alaska, U.S.
- Party: Independent
- Occupation: Commercial fisherman

Brent Johnson (born 1955) is an American politician. An independent, he is the member-elect for the 6th district of the Alaska House of Representatives. He previously served in the Kenai Peninsula Borough Assembly from 2010 to 2016 and again from 2019 to 2025.

Johnson was born in Seldovia, Alaska. He attended and graduated from Ninilchik School. After graduating, he attended Kenai Peninsula College.
