= Halibut Cove, Alaska =

- Census-designated place
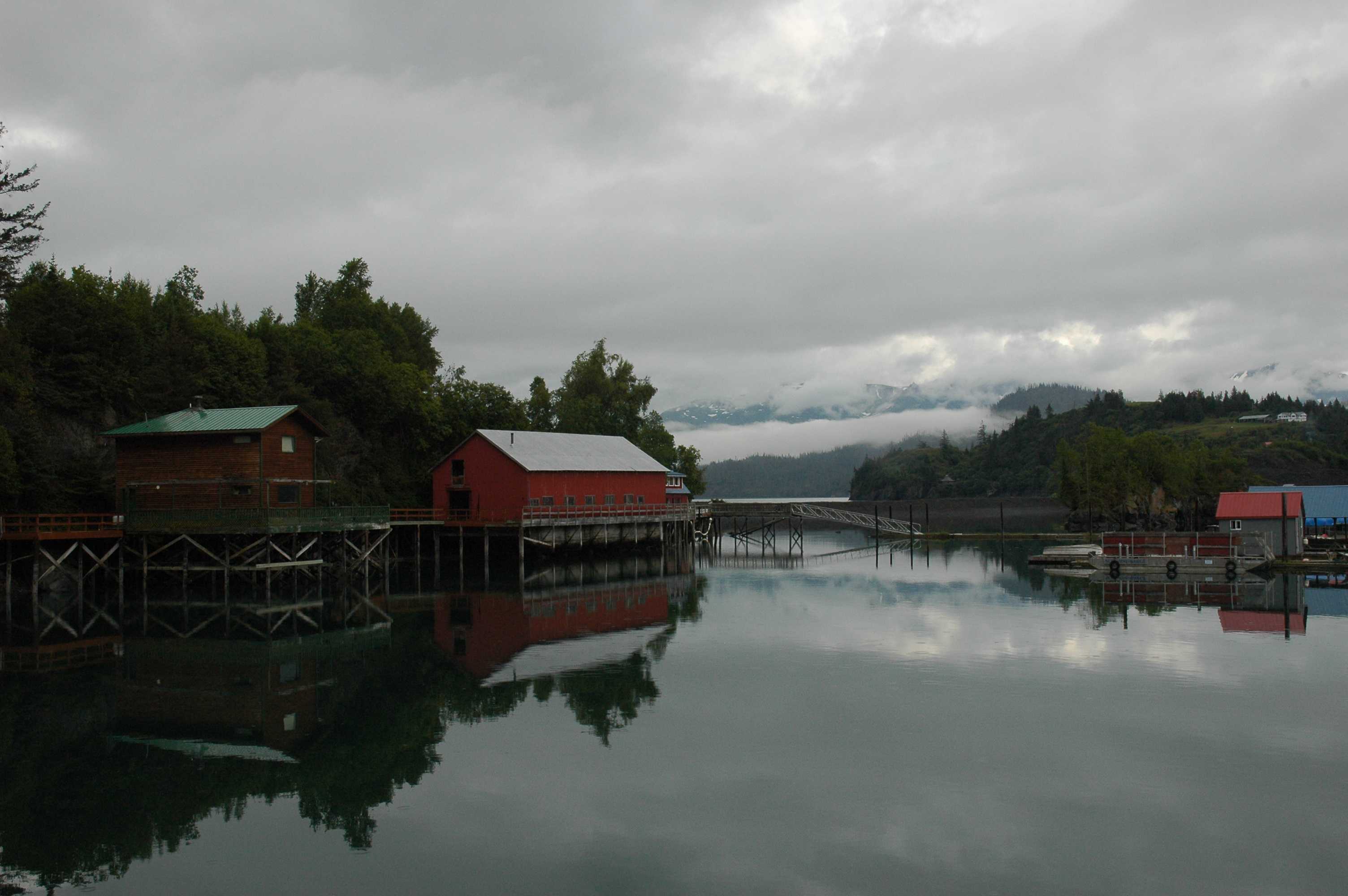
- The harbor at Halibut Cove

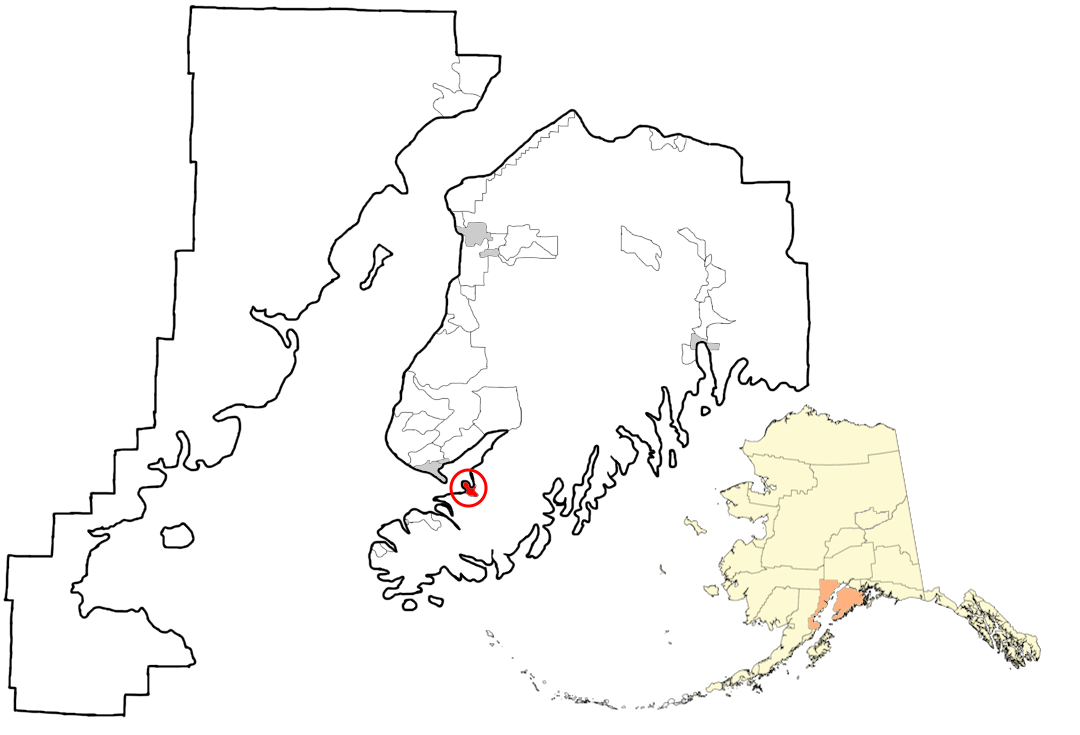
- Location in Kenai Peninsula Borough, Alaska
- Coordinates: 59°35′51″N 151°14′5″W
- Country: United States
- State: Alaska
- Borough: Kenai Peninsula

Government
  - Borough mayor: Peter Micciche
  - State senator: Gary Stevens (R)
  - State rep.: Sarah Vance (R)

Area
  - Total: 11.49 sq mi (29.76 km^{2})
  - Land: 8.32 sq mi (21.55 km^{2})
  - Water: 3.17 sq mi (8.21 km^{2})
- Elevation: 20 ft (6.1 m)

Population (2020)
  - Total: 60
  - Density: 7.2/sq mi (2.78/km^{2})
- Time zone: UTC-9 (Alaska (AKST))
  - Summer (DST): UTC-8 (AKDT)
- ZIP code: 99603
- Area code: 907
- FIPS code: 02-31270

Halibut Cove is a census-designated place (CDP) in Kenai Peninsula Borough, Alaska, United States. As of the 2020 census, Halibut Cove had a population of 60.

Originally a fishing village, Halibut Cove is now home to several artists and businesses. One of the only floating U.S. post offices is located there. A popular tourist destination, the cove offers several lodges and cabins. The only way to get around the cove is by boat.

== Geography ==
Halibut Cove is located in the southern part of the Kenai Peninsula at 59°35′51″N 151°14′5″W (59.597549, -151.234607). It lies on the south side of Kachemak Bay, 10 miles (16 km) southeast of Homer. The CDP is bordered to the east by Halibut Cove and to the west by China Poot Bay, both of which are arms of Kachemak Bay. The town center is on Ismailof Island, lying 500 feet (150 m) off the main peninsula across a small narrows. Peterson Bay is an inlet west of Ismailof Island.

According to the United States Census Bureau, the CDP has a total area of 11.5 square miles (29.8 km^{2}), of which 8.3 square miles (21.5 km^{2}) are land and 3.2 square miles (8.2 km^{2}), or 27.60%, are water.

Visitors reach Halibut Cove by private boat from Homer; by the locally operated ferry, the Danny J.', 'Stormbird; or by float plane. There is no road access; the primary modes of transportation within the cove are by foot, skiff, or ATV. Areas open to the public around the lagoon are connected by boardwalks, and many homes and businesses are fully or partially constructed on pilings over the water.

=== Climate ===
Nabesna has a continental subarctic climate (Köppen Dsc).

Climate data for Halibut Cove, Alaska (1975-1998 normals and extremes)
Month	Jan	Feb	Mar	Apr	May	Jun	Jul	Aug	Sep	Oct	Nov	Dec	Year
Record high °F (°C)	50 (10)	52 (11)	51 (11)	58 (14)	73 (23)	74 (23)	78 (26)	74 (23)	69 (21)	61 (16)	52 (11)	46 (8)	78 (26)
Mean daily maximum °F (°C)	30.6 (−0.8)	31.5 (−0.3)	36.2 (2.3)	44.7 (7.1)	52.6 (11.4)	59.8 (15.4)	63.0 (17.2)	62.2 (16.8)	54.3 (12.4)	43.9 (6.6)	34.2 (1.2)	31.1 (−0.5)	45.4 (7.4)
Mean daily minimum °F (°C)	21.0 (−6.1)	20.1 (−6.6)	23.0 (−5.0)	30.7 (−0.7)	37.0 (2.8)	42.9 (6.1)	47.1 (8.4)	46.9 (8.3)	40.4 (4.7)	31.3 (−0.4)	24.4 (−4.2)	21.2 (−6.0)	32.2 (0.1)
Record low °F (°C)	−20 (−29)	−4 (−20)	−1 (−18)	14 (−10)	22 (−6)	27 (−3)	35 (2)	37 (3)	25 (−4)	4 (−16)	−1 (−18)	−10 (−23)	−20 (−29)
Average precipitation inches (mm)	4.22 (107)	3.29 (84)	3.46 (88)	3.08 (78)	1.98 (50)	1.15 (29)	1.24 (31)	2.55 (65)	5.02 (128)	4.12 (105)	4.15 (105)	5.90 (150)	40.17 (1,020)
Average snowfall inches (cm)	16.8 (43)	14.4 (37)	14.7 (37)	3.8 (9.7)	0.0 (0.0)	0.0 (0.0)	0.0 (0.0)	0.0 (0.0)	0.0 (0.0)	3.3 (8.4)	12.7 (32)	22.6 (57)	88.3 (224)
Source: WRCC

== Demographics ==
Historical population
Census	Pop.	Note	%±
1940	23		—
1960	25		—
1970	44		76.0%
1980	47		6.8%
1990	78		66.0%
2000	35		−55.1%
2010	76		117.1%
2020	60		−21.1%
U.S. Decennial Census

Halibut Cove first appeared on the 1940 U.S. Census as an unincorporated village. It did not appear on the 1950 census, but returned again in 1960, and in every successive census to date. It was made a census-designated place (CDP) in 1980.

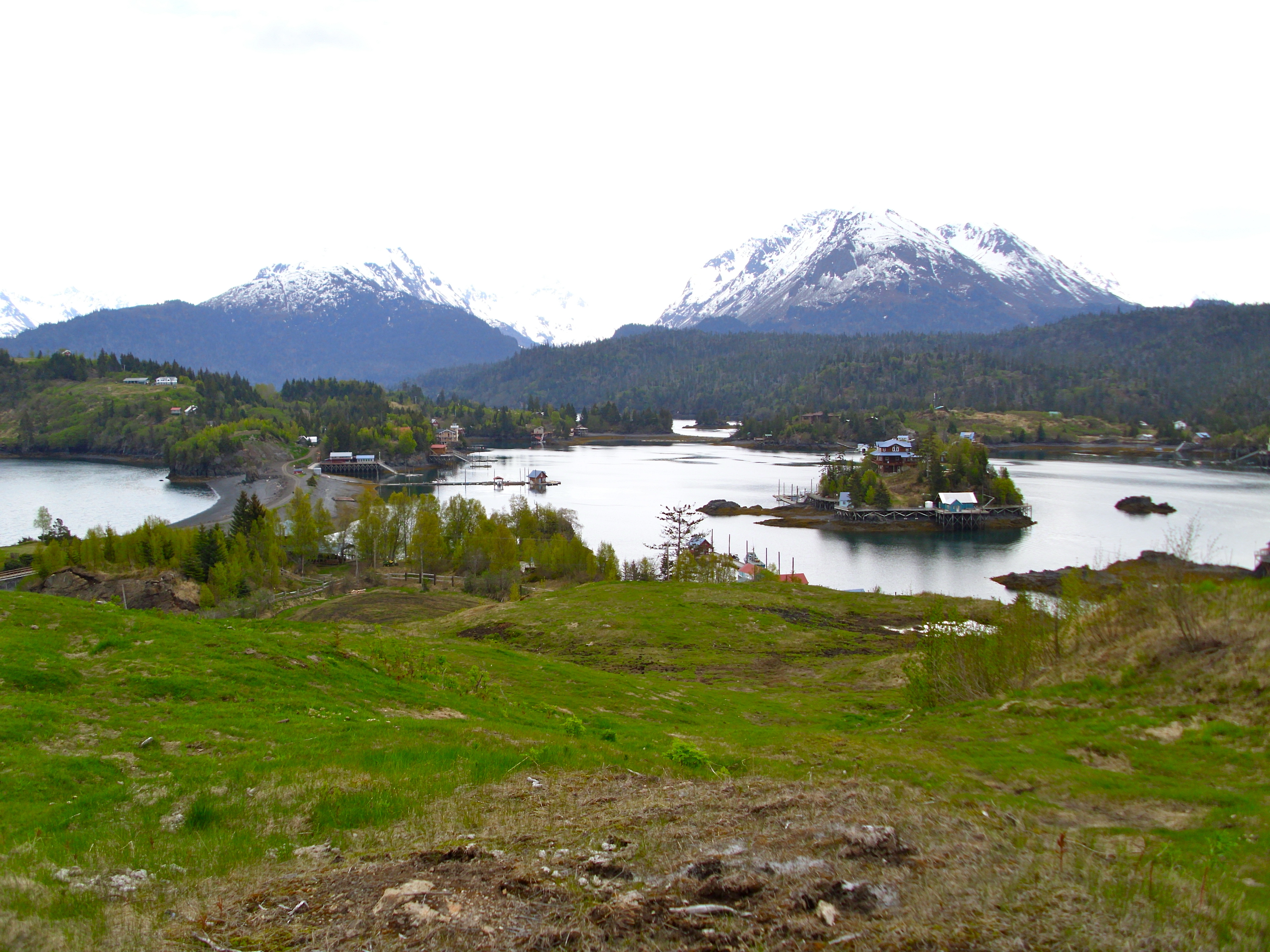
The cove seen from atop the Arch Trail

As of the census of 2010, there were 76 people, 34 households, and 21 families residing in the CDP. There were 161 housing units, of which 127, or 78.9%, were vacant. 99 of the vacant housing units were for seasonal or vacation use. The racial makeup of the CDP was 86.8% white, 6.6% Alaska Native American, and 6.6% from two or more races.

Of the 34 households, 17.6% had children under the age of 18 living with them, 55.9% were headed by married couples living together, and 38.2% were non-families. 32.4% of all households were individuals, and 14.7% were someone living alone age 65 years or older. The average household size was 2.24, and the average family size was 2.57.

In the CDP, 10.5% of the population were under the age of 18, 13.1% were from 18 to 24, 23.6% were from 25 to 44, 38.1% were from 45 to 64, and 14.5% were 65 years of age or older. The median age was 47.5 years. For every 100 females, there were 117.1 males. For every 100 females age 18 and over, there were 119.4 males.
