= Fox River (Alaska) =

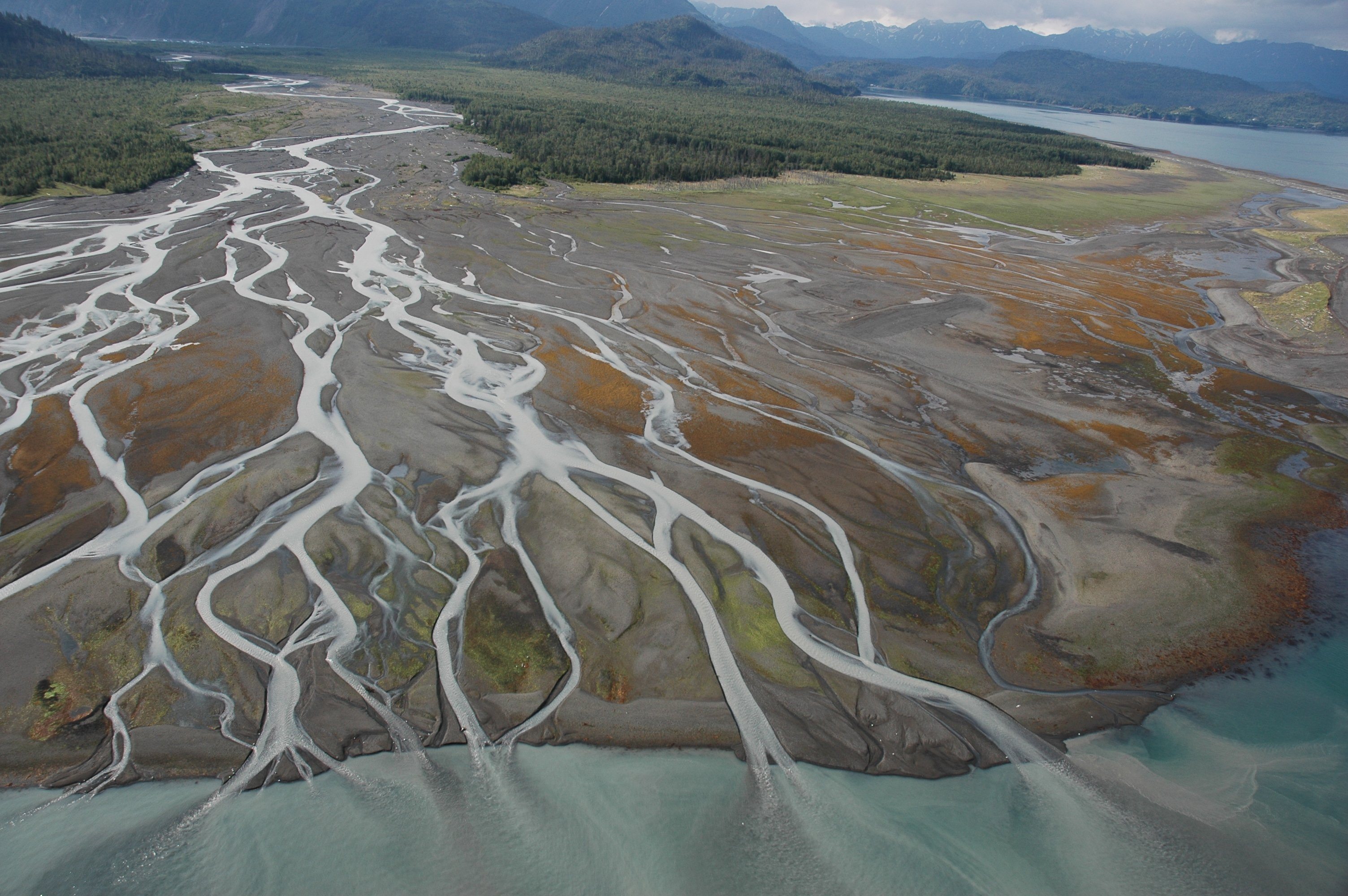

- Location of the mouth of the Fox River in Alaska

Location
- Country: United States
- State: Alaska
- Borough: Kenai Peninsula

Physical characteristics
- Source: Kenai Mountains
  - location: Chernof Glacier, Kenai National Wildlife Refuge
  - coordinates: 59°55′47″N 150°34′01″W
  - elevation: 1,357 ft (414 m)
- Mouth: Kachemak Bay, Cook Inlet
  - location: northeast of Homer
  - coordinates: 59°47′29″N 151°00′07″W
  - elevation: 7 ft (2.1 m)
- Length: 27 mi (43 km)

Fox River is a stream, 27 miles (43 km) long, on the Kenai Peninsula in the U.S. state of Alaska. The river heads at the terminus of the Chernof Glacier in the Kenai Mountains, then flows southwest to the northeast end of Kachemak Bay. The river mouth is 24 miles (39 km) northeast of Homer.

A census-designated place of the same name lies along the river. The river's name was first reported by Dall (1895) and may have been for Theodore Fox of the North Pacific Mining and Transportation Company, which began operations on the bay in the prior year.

== See also ==
- List of rivers of Alaska
