= Bear Lake (Alaska) =

Lake in the state of Alaska, United States

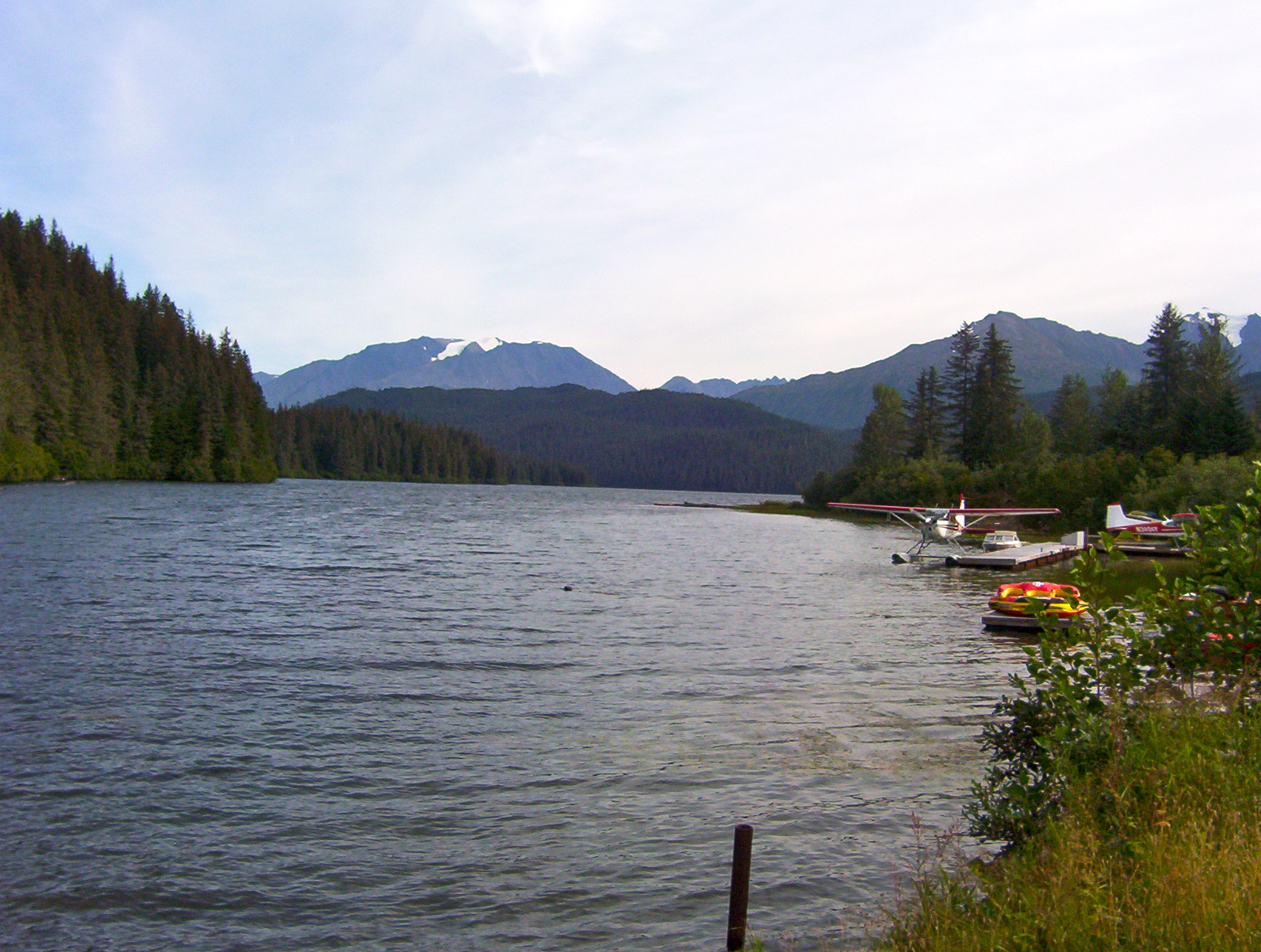
- Boat launch and floatplane dock on Old Sawmill Road

- Location within Alaska Location within North America
- Location: Kenai Peninsula Borough, Alaska
- Coordinates: 60°12′03″N 149°21′11″W
- Primary inflows: Upper Bear Creek, 2 minor streams
- Primary outflows: Bear Creek
- Basin countries: United States
- Max. length: 1.2 mi (1.9 km)
- Max. depth: 63 ft (19 m)
- Islands: 1
- Settlements: Bear Creek

Bear Lake (one of a dozen lakes by this name in Alaska) is near the town of Seward and Resurrection Bay, in the Kenai Peninsula Borough on the Kenai Peninsula in the U.S. state of Alaska. It is publicly accessible by turning down Bear Creek Road, which connects it to the Seward Highway, and then Old Sawmill Road. It is the site of salmon enhancement activities since 1962. This program is now managed by the Cook Inlet Aquaculture Association. Current projects at Bear Lake focus on increasing sockeye and coho salmon by controlling species that are predators and competitors, and by stocking the lake with those salmon species. The lake is primarily fed by the meltwater of Bear Lake Glacier, which feeds into it via the upper portion of Bear Creek.

The Bear Lake Formation provides scientists with important geological information about the Miocene environment.
