= Kenai Peninsula Borough, Alaska =

Borough in Alaska, United States

- Borough
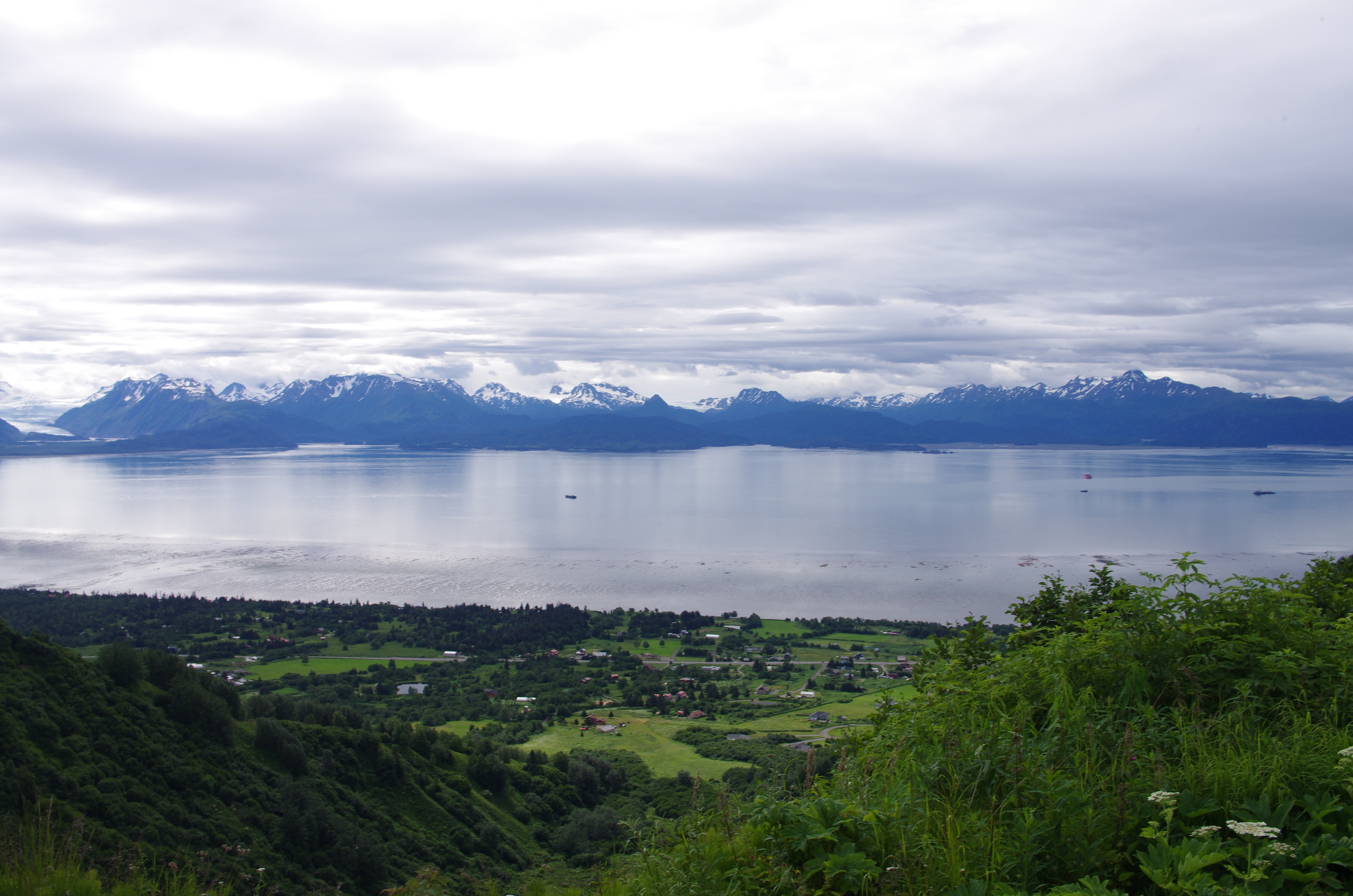
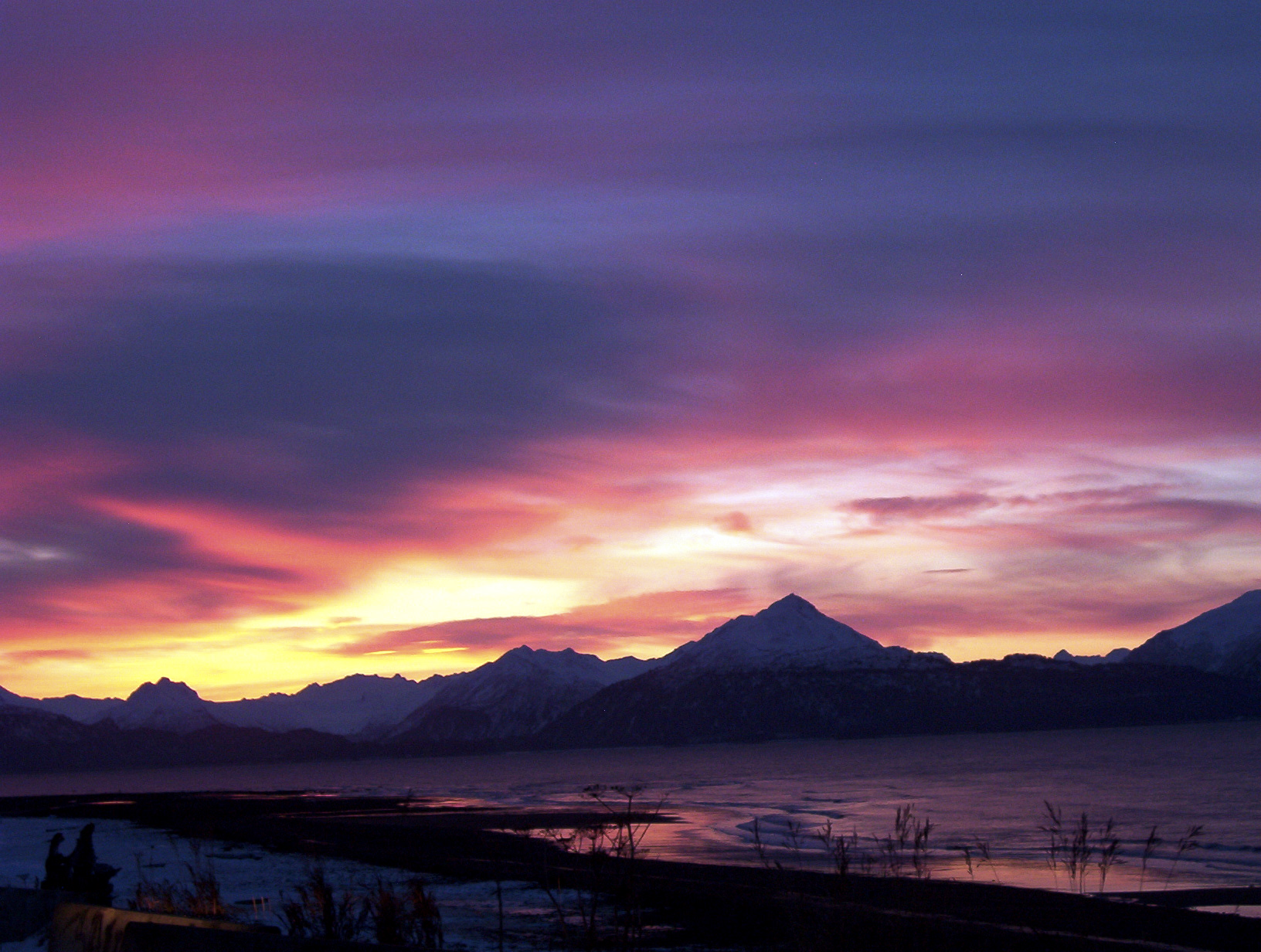
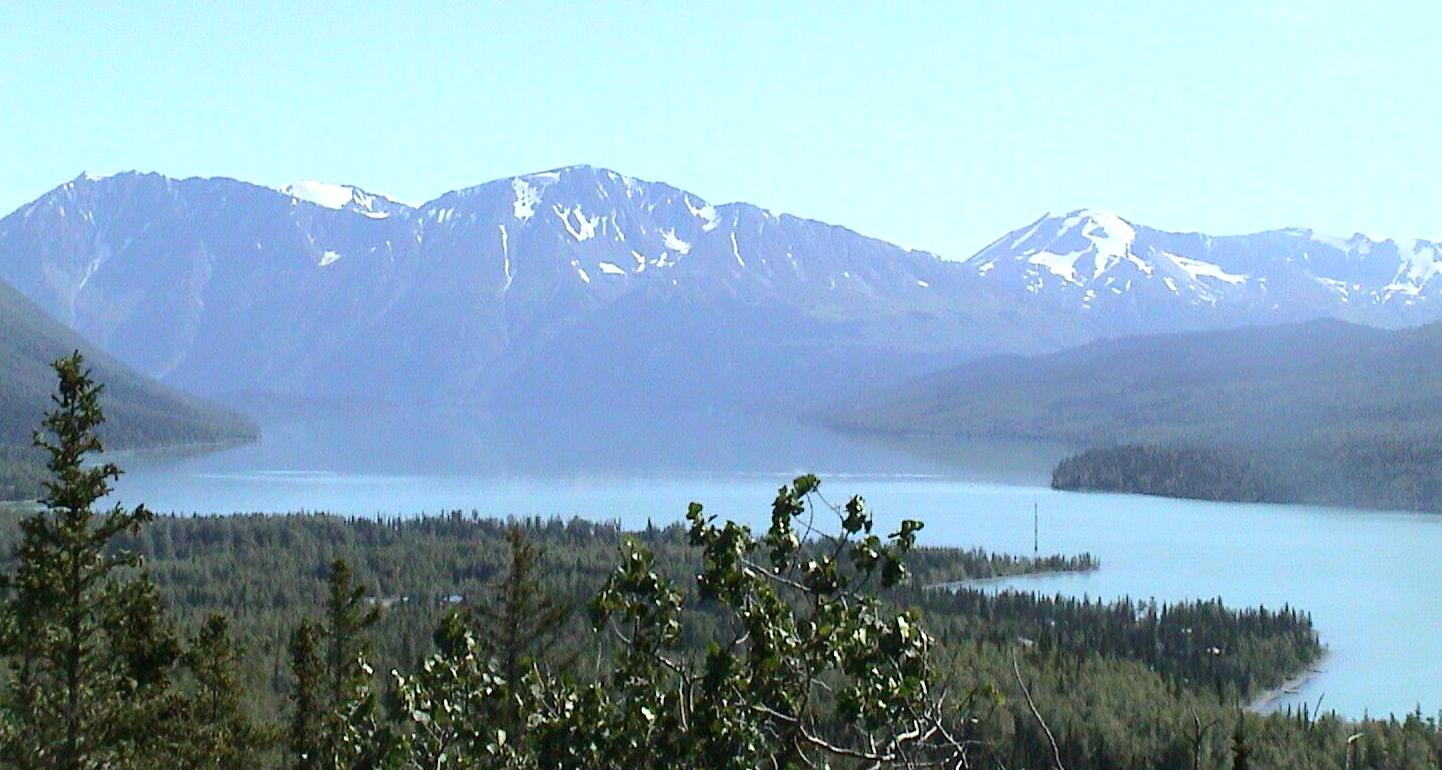
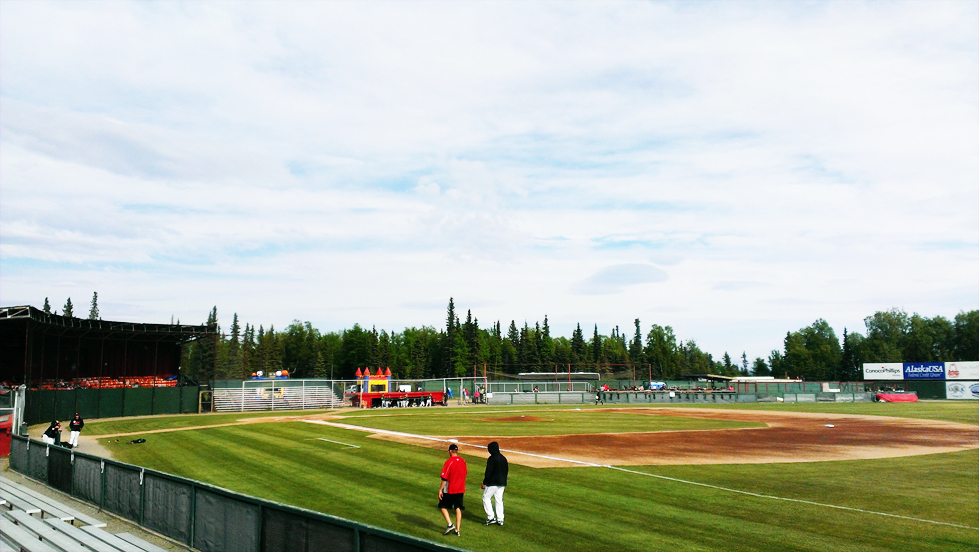
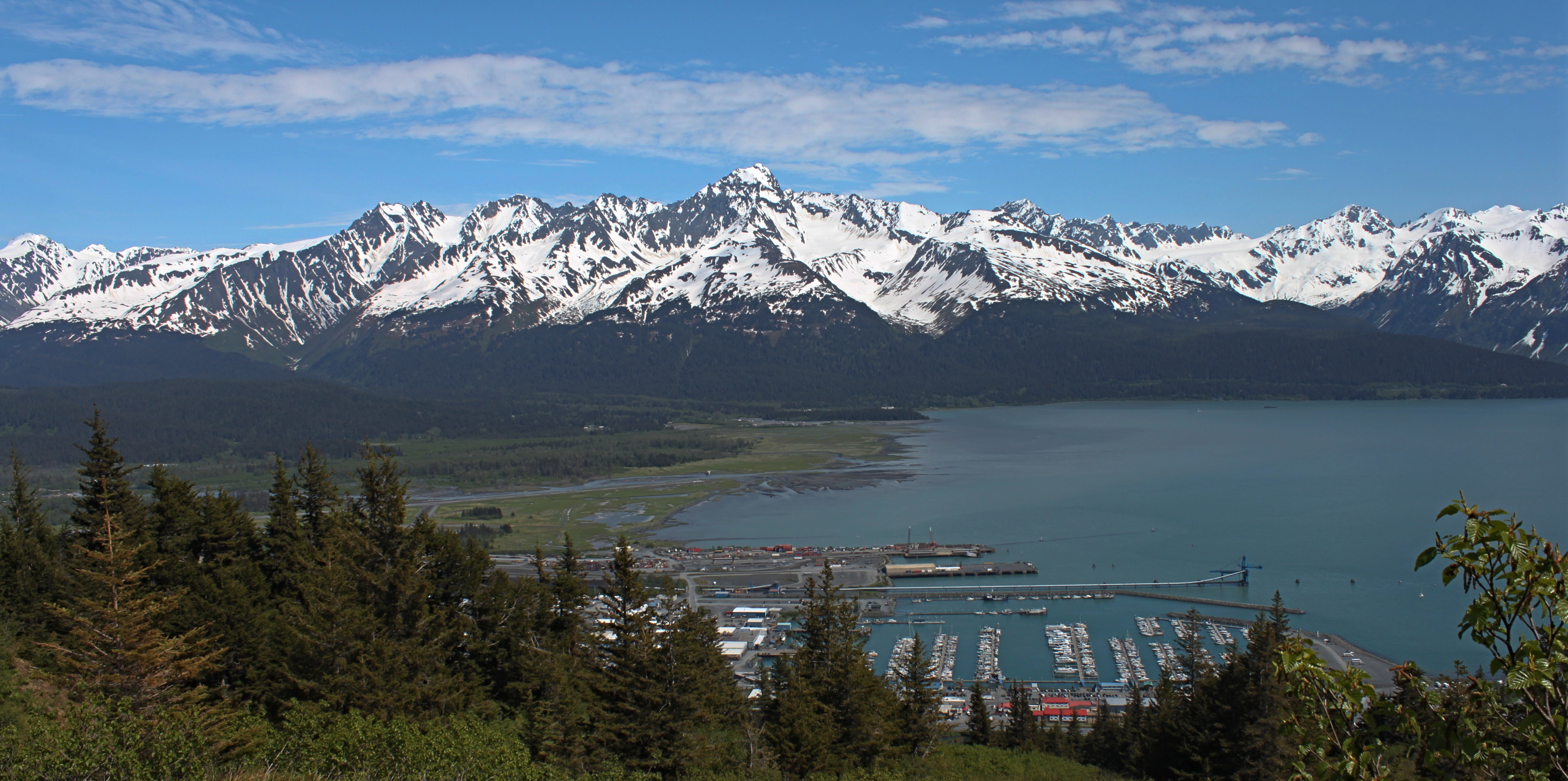
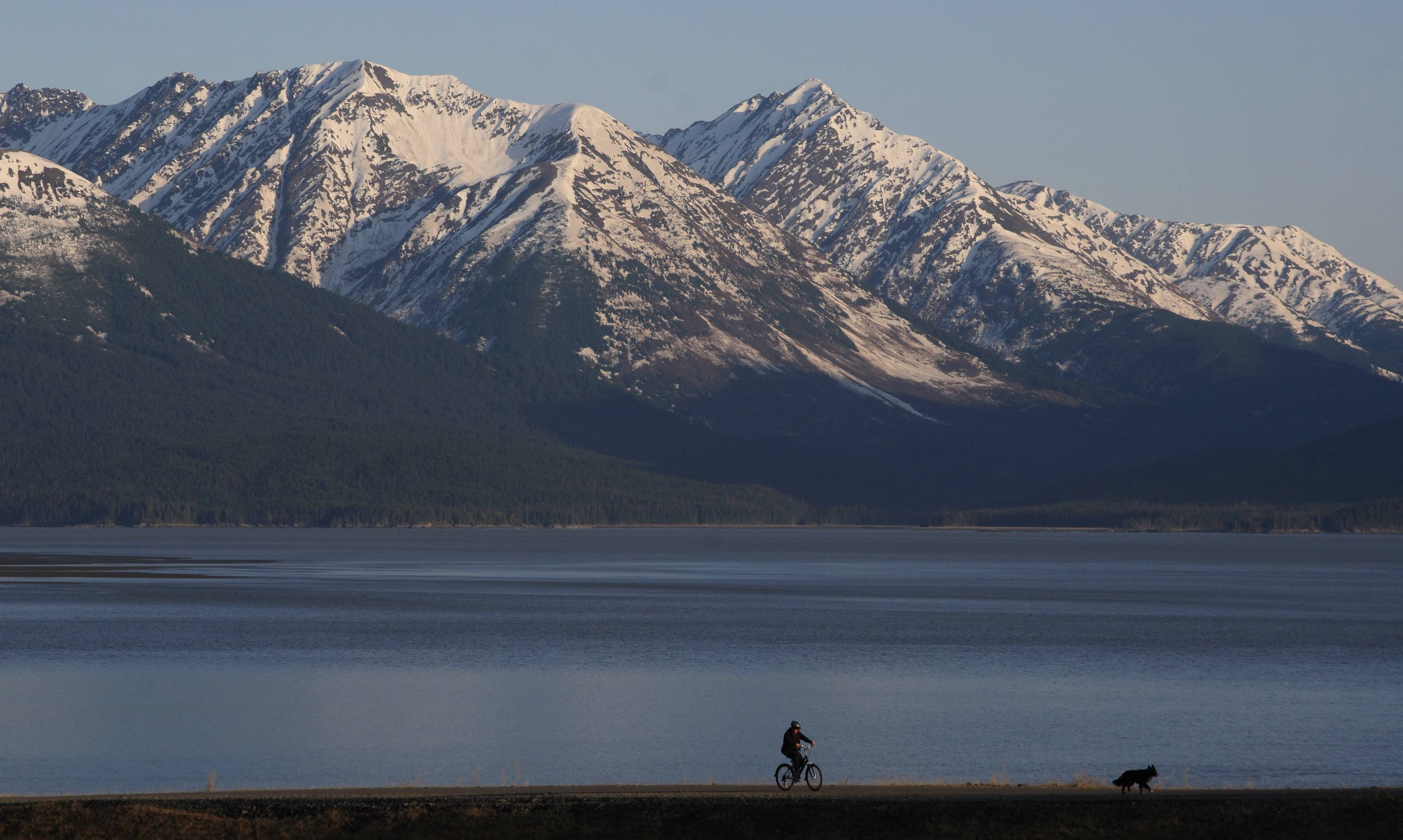
- Left to right, from top: Overhead view of Homer and Kachemak Bay, sunrise on Kachemak Bay, view of Kenai Lake, the Coral Seymour Memorial Ballpark, view of Mount Alice at Seward, view of the Kenai Mountains

- Seal

- Location within the U.S. state of Alaska
- Coordinates: 60°25′00″N 151°15′00″W
- Country: United States
- State: Alaska
- Incorporated: January 1, 1964
- Named for: Kenai Peninsula
- Seat: Soldotna
- Largest city: Kalifornsky

Area
  - Total: 24,752 sq mi (64,110 km^{2})
  - Land: 16,075 sq mi (41,630 km^{2})
  - Water: 8,677 sq mi (22,470 km^{2}) 35.1%

Population (2020)
  - Total: 58,799
  - Estimate (2025): 61,951 ▲
  - Density: 3.6578/sq mi (1.4123/km^{2})
- Time zone: UTC−9 (Alaska)
  - Summer (DST): UTC−8 (ADT)
- Congressional district: At-large
- Website: www.kpb.us

Kenai Peninsula Borough is a borough in the U.S. state of Alaska. As of the 2020 census, the population was 58,799, up from 55,400 in 2010. The borough seat is Soldotna, the largest city is Kenai, and the most populated community is the census-designated place of Kalifornsky.

The borough includes most of the Kenai Peninsula and a large area of the mainland of Alaska on the opposite side of Cook Inlet.

== Geography ==
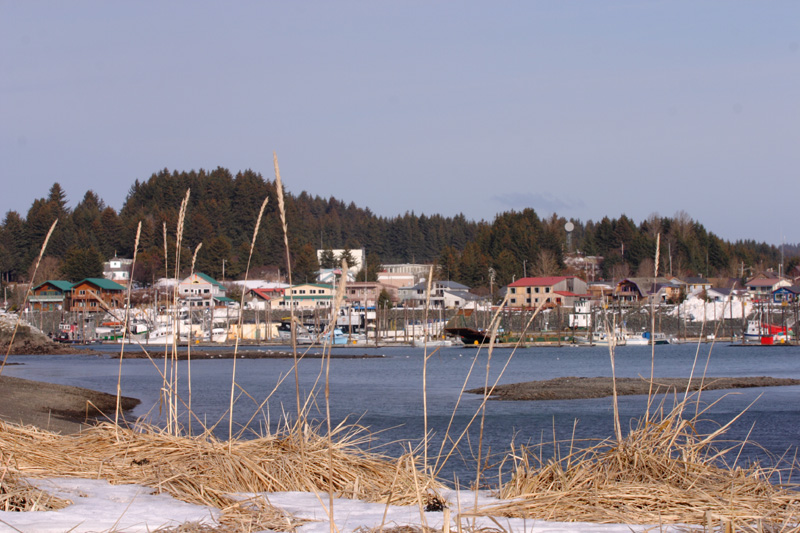
View of Seldovia, located along Kachemak Bay

The borough has a total area of 24,752 square miles (64,110 km^{2}), of which 16,075 square miles (41,630 km^{2}) is land and 8,677 square miles (22,470 km^{2}) (3.4%) is water.

=== Adjacent boroughs and census areas ===
- Bethel Census Area, Alaska - northwest
- Matanuska-Susitna Borough, Alaska - north
- Municipality of Anchorage, Alaska - north
- Chugach Census Area, Alaska - east
- Lake and Peninsula Borough, Alaska - west
- Kodiak Island Borough, Alaska - south

=== National protected areas ===
- Alaska Maritime National Wildlife Refuge (part of Gulf of Alaska unit)
  - Chiswell Islands
  - Tuxedni Wilderness
- Chugach National Forest (part)
- Katmai National Park and Preserve (part)
  - Katmai Wilderness (part)
- Kenai Fjords National Park
- Kenai National Wildlife Refuge
  - Kenai Wilderness
- Lake Clark National Park and Preserve (part)
  - Lake Clark Wilderness (part)

== Ecology ==
Bear Lake, Tutka Bay, and the Trail Lakes, have been the site of salmon enhancement activities. All three sites are managed by the Cook Inlet Aquaculture Association Some of the fish hatched at these facilities are released into the famous Homer fishing hole. Cook Inlet Keeper and the Cook Inlet Regional Citizen's Advisory Council are groups that attempt to influence public policy on the use of the area's resources.

== Demographics ==
Historical population
Census	Pop.	Note	%±
1960	6,097		—
1970	14,250		133.7%
1980	25,282		77.4%
1990	40,802		61.4%
2000	49,691		21.8%
2010	55,400		11.5%
2020	58,799		6.1%
2025 (est.)	61,951	▲	5.4%
U.S. Decennial Census; 1790-1960 1900-1990; 1990-2000 2010-2020

=== 2020 census ===
Kenai Peninsula Borough, Alaska – Racial and ethnic composition Note: the US Census treats Hispanic/Latino as an ethnic category. This table excludes Latinos from the racial categories and assigns them to a separate category. Hispanics/Latinos may be of any race.
Race / Ethnicity (NH = Non-Hispanic)	Pop 1980	Pop 1990	Pop 2000	Pop 2010	Pop 2020	% 1980	% 1990	% 2000	% 2010	% 2020
White alone (NH)	22,859	36,580	42,263	45,879	45,546	90.42%	89.65%	85.05%	82.81%	77.46%
Black or African American alone (NH)	40	196	220	248	361	0.16%	0.48%	0.44%	0.45%	0.61%
Native American or Alaska Native alone (NH)	1,738	2,892	3,644	3,970	4,107	6.87%	7.09%	7.33%	7.17%	6.98%
Asian alone (NH)	200	398	471	614	793	0.79%	0.98%	0.95%	1.11%	1.35%
Native Hawaiian or Pacific Islander alone (NH)	x	x	85	111	173	x	x	0.17%	0.20%	0.29%
Other race alone (NH)	87	10	129	79	372	0.34%	0.02%	0.26%	0.14%	0.63%
Mixed race or Multiracial (NH)	x	x	1,792	2,858	5,119	x	x	3.61%	5.16%	8.71%
Hispanic or Latino (any race)	358	726	1,087	1,641	2,328	1.42%	1.78%	2.19%	2.96%	3.96%
Total	25,282	40,802	49,691	55,400	58,799	100.00%	100.00%	100.00%	100.00%	100.00%

As of the 2020 census, the borough had a population of 58,799; the median age was 42.3 years. 21.8% of residents were under the age of 18 and 19.2% were 65 years of age or older. For every 100 females there were 109.0 males, and for every 100 females age 18 and over there were 108.9 males age 18 and over.

The racial makeup of the borough was 78.9% White, 0.7% Black or African American, 7.2% American Indian and Alaska Native, 1.4% Asian, 0.3% Native Hawaiian and Pacific Islander, 1.4% from some other race, and 10.2% from two or more races. Hispanic or Latino residents of any race comprised 4.0% of the population.

22.6% of residents lived in urban areas, while 77.4% lived in rural areas.

There were 23,873 households in the borough, of which 26.5% had children under the age of 18 living with them and 21.2% had a female householder with no spouse or partner present. About 30.3% of all households were made up of individuals and 12.4% had someone living alone who was 65 years of age or older.

There were 32,622 housing units, of which 26.8% were vacant. Among occupied housing units, 74.2% were owner-occupied and 25.8% were renter-occupied. The homeowner vacancy rate was 2.0% and the rental vacancy rate was 9.5%.

=== 2000 census ===
As of the census of 2000, there were 49,700 people, 18,400 households, and 12,700 families residing in the borough. The population density was 1 people/km^{2} (2.6 people/mi^{2}). There were 24,900 housing units at an average density of 2 units per square mile (0.77 units/km^{2}). The racial makeup of the borough was 86% White, 7% Native American, 2% Hispanic or Latino (any race), and 4% from two or more races. Black or African Americans, Asians, and Pacific Islanders each were less than 1%. Just under 1% were from other races combined. 1.92% reported speaking Russian at home, while 1.74% spoke Spanish.

Of the 18,400 households, 38% had children under the age of 18 living with them, 55% were married couples living together, 9% had a female householder with no husband present, and 31% were non-families. 25% of households were one person, and 5% were one person aged 65 or older. The average household size was 2.6 and the average family size was 3.2.

In the borough the population was spread out, with 30% under the age of 18, 7% from 18 to 24, 30% from 25 to 44, 26% from 45 to 64, and 7% 65 or older. The median age was 36 years. For every 100 females, there were 109 males; for every 100 females age 18 and over there were 110 males.

== Government and infrastructure ==
There is a borough-wide government based in Soldotna, consisting of a strong mayor and an assembly of representatives from all areas of the borough. They collect sales and property taxes and provide services such as road maintenance, waste collection facilities, emergency services and major funding for public schools, along with mitigation of damage from spruce bark beetles that infested the borough in the late 1990s and early 2000s. Incorporated towns also have their own local governments and city councils. The Alaska Department of Corrections operates the Spring Creek Correctional Center near Seward and the Wildwood Correctional Complex near Kenai.

Kenai Peninsula is one of the most Republican boroughs in the state, having last backed a Democrat for president in 1968.

United States presidential election results for Kenai Peninsula Borough, Alaska
Year	Republican		Democratic		Third party(ies)	
Year	No.	%	No.	%	No.	%
1960	1,573	47.29%	1,753	52.71%	0	0.00%
1964	1,265	35.49%	2,299	64.51%	0	0.00%
1968	2,044	39.35%	2,169	41.76%	981	18.89%
1972	3,214	57.45%	1,520	27.17%	860	15.37%
1976	4,697	60.32%	2,528	32.46%	562	7.22%
1980	7,020	60.78%	2,178	18.86%	2,352	20.36%
1984	10,297	70.38%	3,687	25.20%	646	4.42%
1988	8,633	61.05%	4,718	33.37%	789	5.58%
1992	6,902	37.50%	4,828	26.23%	6,676	36.27%
1996	10,606	58.13%	5,177	28.37%	2,462	13.49%
2000	15,053	66.81%	4,633	20.56%	2,846	12.63%
2004	10,478	67.93%	4,648	30.13%	299	1.94%
2008	18,949	67.30%	8,362	29.70%	845	3.00%
2012	17,157	67.35%	7,721	30.31%	598	2.35%
2016	18,408	67.02%	7,578	27.59%	1,481	5.39%
2020	21,761	64.10%	10,965	32.30%	1,222	3.60%
2024	21,861	65.50%	10,347	31.00%	1,168	3.50%

== Communities ==
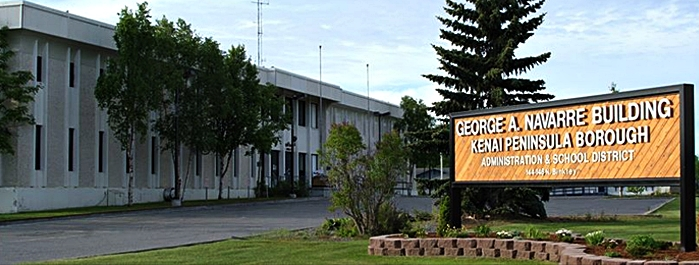
The George A. Navarre Building on Binkley Street in downtown Soldotna serves as the administrative headquarters for the borough and its school district. Navarre moved to Kenai in 1957, owned and operated a variety of Kenai-based businesses, and was the borough's mayor from 1966 to 1972. His son, Mike Navarre, was mayor from 1996 to 1999 and 2011 to 2017.

=== Cities ===
- Homer
- Kachemak
- Kenai
- Seldovia
- Seward
- Soldotna (Borough seat)

=== Census-designated places ===
- Anchor Point
- Bear Creek
- Beluga
- Clam Gulch
- Cohoe
- Cooper Landing
- Crown Point
- Diamond Ridge
- Fox River
- Fritz Creek
- Funny River
- Halibut Cove
- Happy Valley
- Hope
- Kalifornsky
- Kasilof
- Lowell Point
- Moose Pass
- Nanwalek
- Nikiski
- Nikolaevsk
- Ninilchik
- Point Possession
- Port Graham
- Primrose
- Ridgeway
- Salamatof
- Seldovia Village
- Sterling
- Sunrise
- Tyonek

=== Unincorporated communities ===
- Jakolof Bay
- Kachemak Selo
- Razdolna
- Voznesenka

=== Ghost town ===
- Portlock

=== Census Subareas ===
- Kenai-Cook Inlet

== Education ==
The school district for the whole borough is Kenai Peninsula Borough School District.

== See also ==
- 2006 Arctic Winter Games
- Kalgin Island
- List of airports in the Kenai Peninsula Borough
- State parks on the Kenai Peninsula
