= Paul Seaton =

American politician

Paul K. Seaton
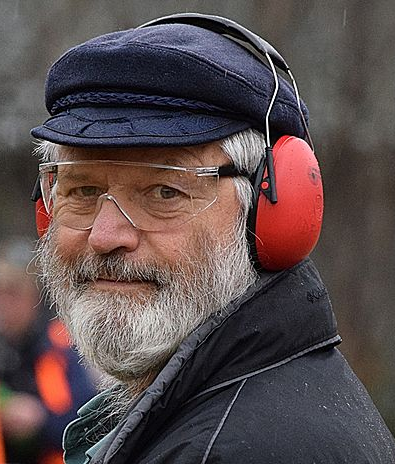
- Seaton at the Alaska Legislature's annual shooting competition in 2015

Member of the Alaska House of Representatives from the 31st district
- In office January 20, 2003 – January 15, 2019
- Preceded by: Drew Scalzi
- Succeeded by: Sarah Vance

Personal details
- Born: October 1, 1945 (age 81) Oxnard, California, U.S.
- Party: Republican
- Spouse: Tina
- Children: Rand, Tawny
- Education: University of Alaska, Fairbanks
- Occupation: Fisherman/Educator

Paul K. Seaton (born October 1, 1945) is a former Republican member of the Alaska House of Representatives, who represented the southern Kenai Peninsula between 2003 and 2018.

== Political career ==
In 2002, Seaton ran in the Republican primary against incumbent Drew Scazi, winning with 60% of the vote.

Since then, he has chaired the Education Committee, State Affairs Committee, Health & Social Services Committee, Resources Committee and the Special Committee on Fisheries. He also served on the Commerce, Community & Economic Development, Education & Early Development, Environmental Conservation, and Law Finance Subcommittees, for the 26th Legislature.

=== 2016 election ===
Seaton won his 2016 Republican primary with 48% of the vote, followed by John Cox with 27%, and Mary Wythe with 25%. After being elected without general election opposition to his 7th term in the state house, Seaton joined a majority coalition of Democrats, Independents, and two other Republicans, with an avowed goal of ameliorating the state's budget deficit, the latter a product of declining oil revenues, budgeting, and prior taxation restructuring. Seaton was chosen to co-chair the house finance committee. Tuckerman Babcock, chair of the Alaska Republican Party, informed Seaton by letter that the party will recruit and support a primary opponent against him in 2018. While campaigning early in 2016, Seaton said he doubted the Legislature could continue to successfully organize "simply on partisan grounds," and that legislators needed to address the budgetary crisis.

=== 2018 election ===
Seaton filed for re-election as a nonpartisan candidate and ran unopposed in the Democratic primary. Three Republicans filed to challenge him in the general election: Jon Cox, Sarah Vance, and Hank Kroll. He lost to Sarah Vance in the general election on November 6, 2018, after advancing from the primary on August 21, 2018.

== Personal life ==
Seaton has a wife, Tina, and two children, Tawny and Rand. Seaton graduated from Ventura College with an A.A. in 1965; from the University of Alaska, Fairbanks with a B.S. in 1966 and an M.A. in 1969, respectively; and from the University of California, San Diego with an M.S. 1972. He attended the University of California, Santa Barbara from 1974 to 1976 where he studied the crustacean population ecology. He also graduated from AVTEC (Alaska's Technology Institute) in Diesel Mechanics in 1979.
