= Voznesenka, Alaska =

Unincorporated community in the state of Alaska, United States

Coordinates: 59°47′41″N 151°5′48″W

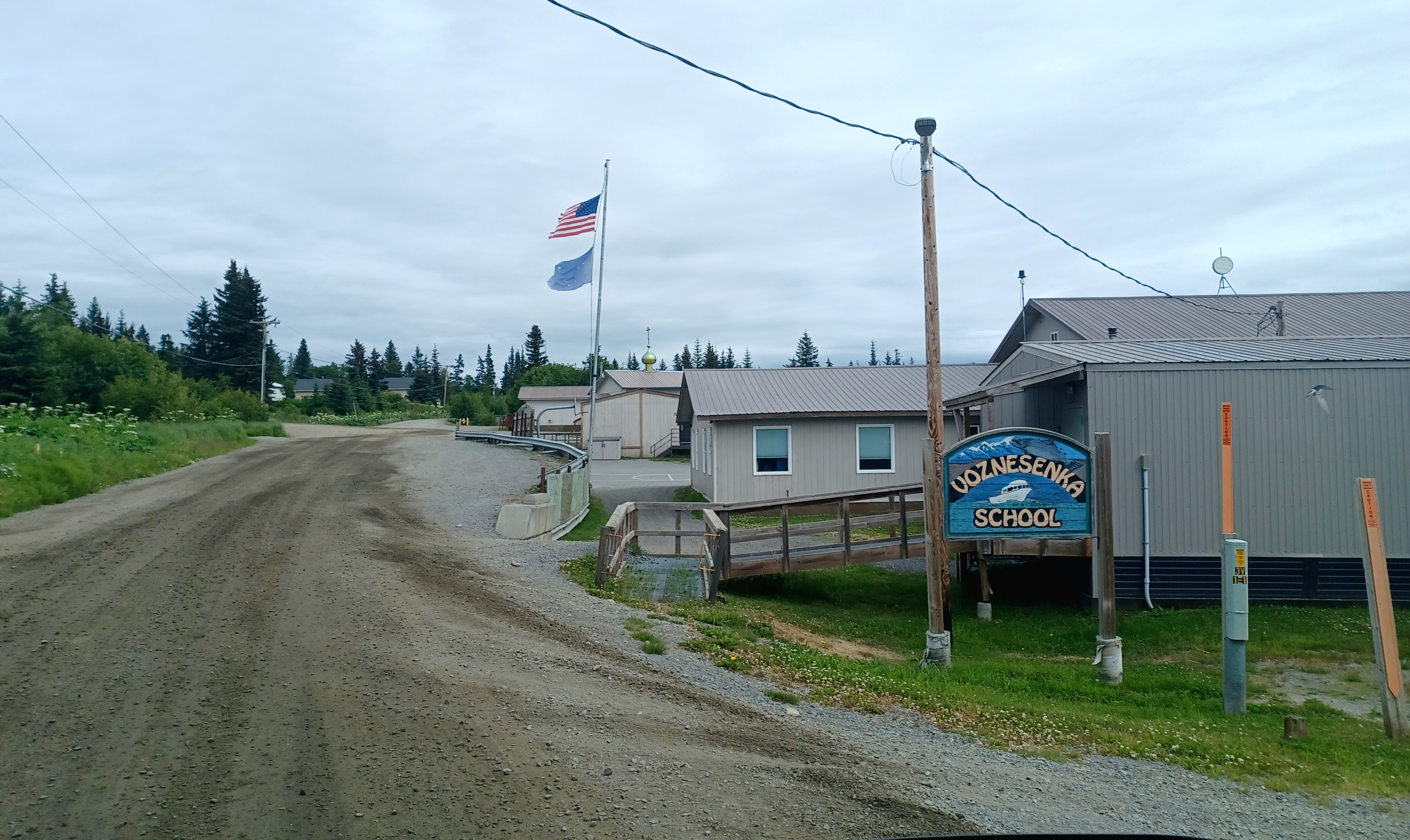
Voznesenka Loop Road

Voznesenka (Russian: Вознесенка, pronounced [ʋəzʲnʲɪˈsʲɛnkə]) is a small unincorporated community in the Kenai Peninsula Borough 23 miles northeast of Homer, Alaska, United States.

== Brief overlook ==
Located on the Kenai Peninsula, about 22 miles (35 km) east of Homer, Voznesenka is one of several villages founded by Russian Old Believers in the Fox River area. The village was founded in 1985 by residents who decided to leave Nikolaevsk and begin new settlements in the Kachemak Bay area. The name in Russian means Ascension (вознестись, voznestis' – to ascend) referring to the holiday of the Feast of the Ascension. The village is situated on a bluff over Kachemak Bay, and is at the end of the maintained road system on the western Kenai Peninsula. A switchback trail leads about 1,000 feet (300 m) down to the beach; it can be traveled by foot or 4-wheel drive vehicle except at the highest tides to reach the neighboring village of Kachemak Selo. There are more than 40 families living in Voznesenka. The unincorporated village has a mayor, a community council, and a water-utility board. There is also a community church and a public school in the village. The school maintains a student population of roughly 115 students. Emergency services are provided by Kachemak Emergency Services Area Fire and EMS. The community is accessible by gravel road, the paved access road from Homer ending where the village begins. In 2009, the Mile 17 fire threatened the village.
