= Kachemak Selo, Alaska =

Unincorporated community in the state of Alaska, United States

Kachemak Selo (Russian: Качемак Село) is a small unincorporated community in Kenai Peninsula Borough, Alaska, United States. Located on the Kenai Peninsula, it lies roughly 30 miles east of Homer. The community is one of several settlements of Russian Old Believers in the Fox River area. There are about 160 residents. The only land access is by driving east of Homer to Voznesenka and descending a steep switchback trail to the beach, then traveling about 1 mile up the beach to reach Kachemak Selo.

== Geography ==
Kachemak Selo is located at 59°47′29″N 151°4′29″W (59.79148, -151.07465).
