= Cook Inlet Aquaculture Association =

Non-profit organization for sustainable salmon stocks in Cook Inlet

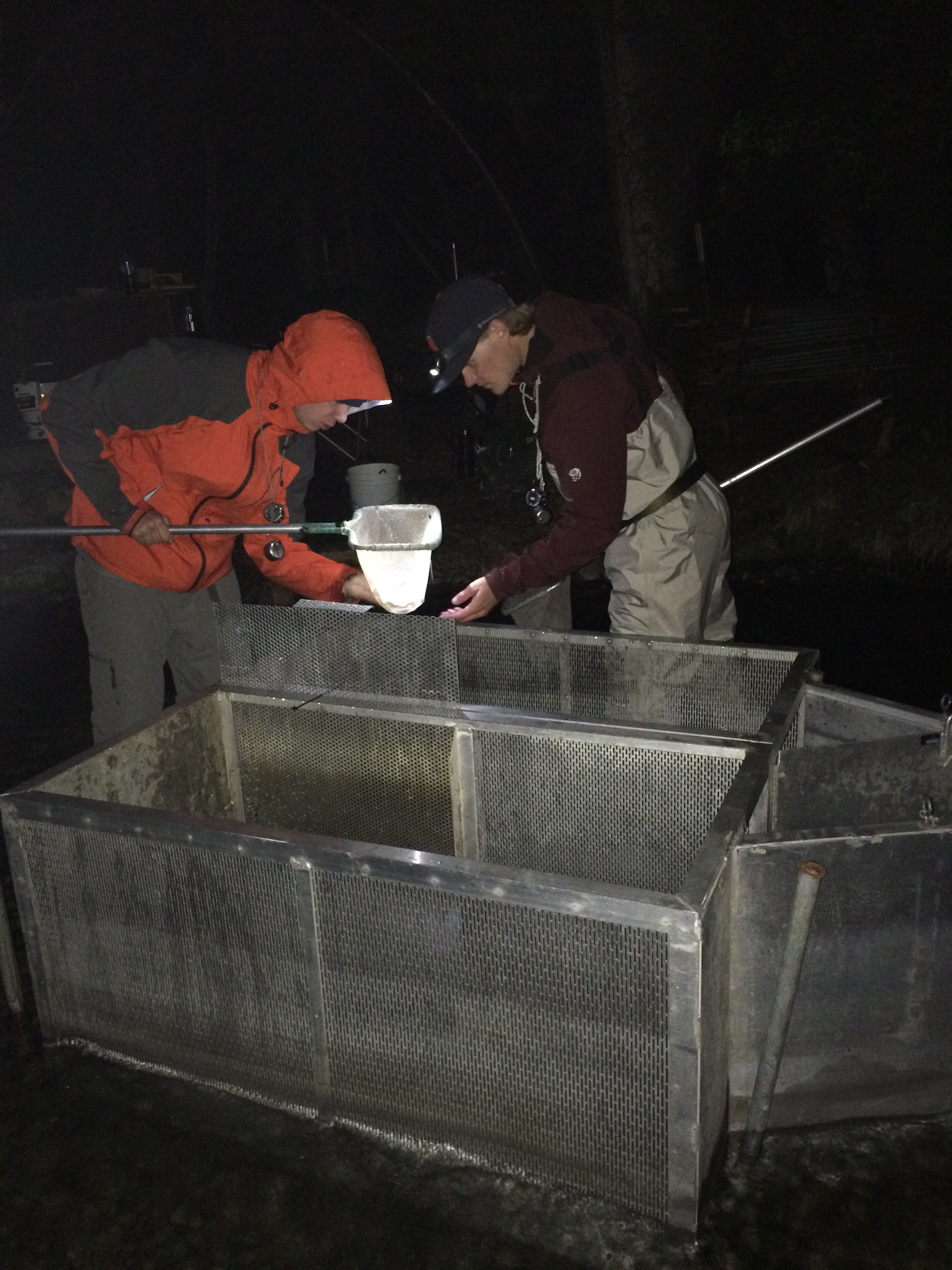
CIAA staff count sockeye salmon smolt as they migrate out of Hidden Lake on the Kenai Peninsula

The Cook Inlet Aquaculture Association (CIAA) is a non-profit organization based in Kenai, Alaska, that works to create sustainable salmon stocks in the Cook Inlet area.

Initially the Alaska Department of Fish and Game ran most hatchery programs in Alaska, but as commercial fishermen began to see the benefits of such programs and began their own organizations in the 1970s and 1980s, ADF&G gradually phased itself out and co-ordinated efforts with privately run hatchery organizations like CIAA, one of eight regional aquaculture associations in Alaska. By 2001 CIAA was able to release 85 million salmon fry in a single year. It is estimated that 20–30% of commercially caught salmon in this region were spawned at CIAA hatcheries. The Association's programs include hatcheries that produce salmon fry, which are released in streams and lakes; construction and maintenance of salmon migration routes, referred to as "fishways"; and scientific research into salmon breeding and behavior patterns. CIAA works closely with the Alaska Department of Fish and Game, who still own two of the three hatcheries operated by CIAA.

Because of the importance of salmon to Alaska's economy, CIAA has at times been involved in controversy involving the tug-of-war between commercial and sport fisheries, and was at the center of a prolonged lawsuit involving its Trail Lakes hatchery.

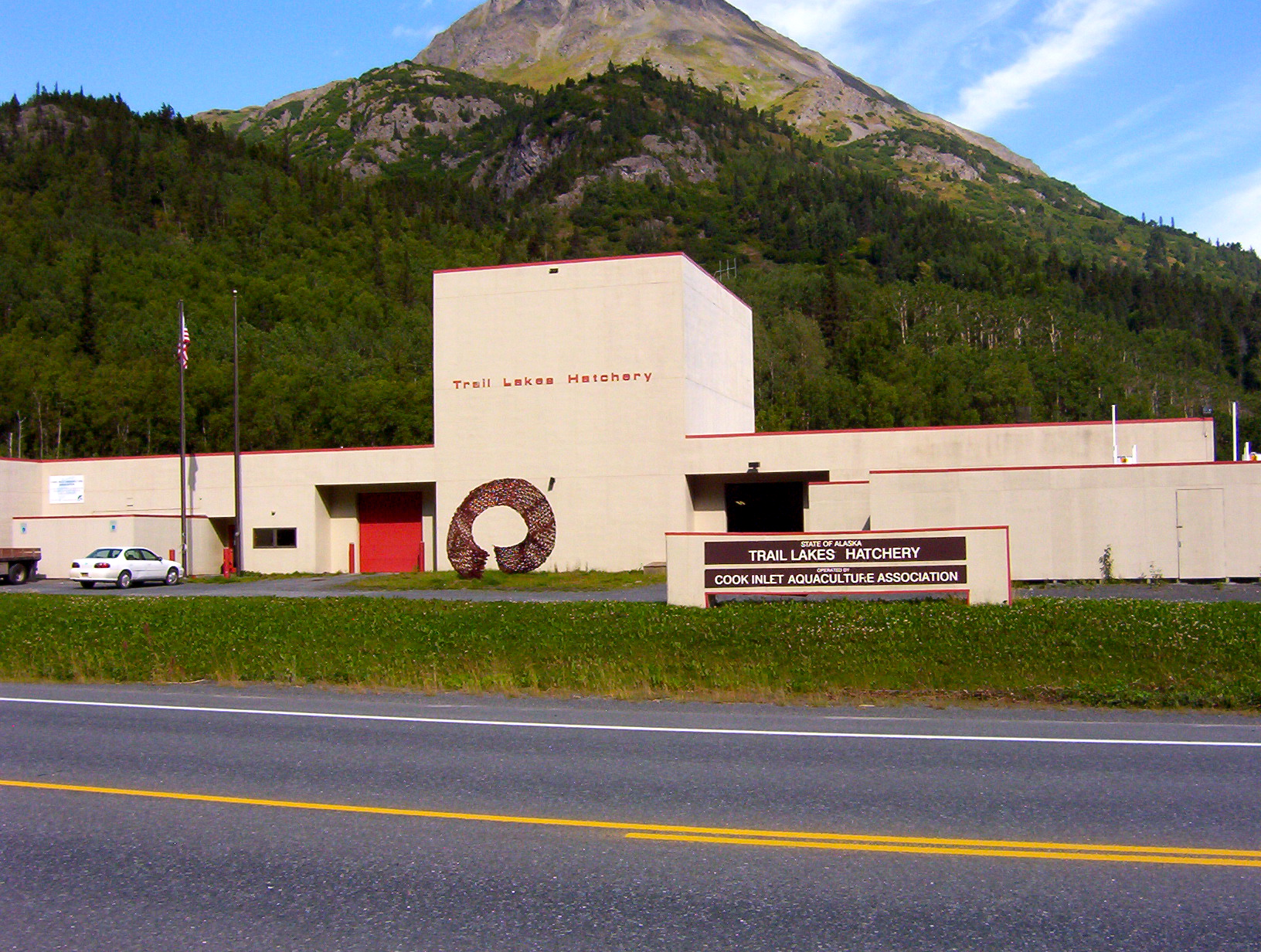
Trail Lakes Hatchery, source of salmon for the fishing on the kenai peninsula

In 2010 a brown bear attacked a small boy in an area adjacent to the Association's fish weir near Bear Lake, leading some in the area to call for the closing of that facility, as they felt it was attracting bears. However, the victim believed the bear was actually after berries and was simply startled by the boy's sudden arrival.
