= Razdolna, Alaska =

Unincorporated community in the state of Alaska, United States

Coordinates: 59.8110°N 151.0837°W

Razdolna (Russian: Раздольна, pronounced [rɐzdˈolʲna]) is a small unincorporated community in Kenai Peninsula Borough, Alaska, United States. Located on the Kenai Peninsula, it lies roughly 30 miles east of Homer. The community is one of several settlements of Russian Old Believers in the Fox River area. There are about 30 families in Razdolna. In 2009 the Mile 17 fire threatened the hamlet.
