= Kachemak Bay =

Bay in the southwestern Kenai Peninsula, Alaska, United States

- Tika Kaq' (Denaʼina)
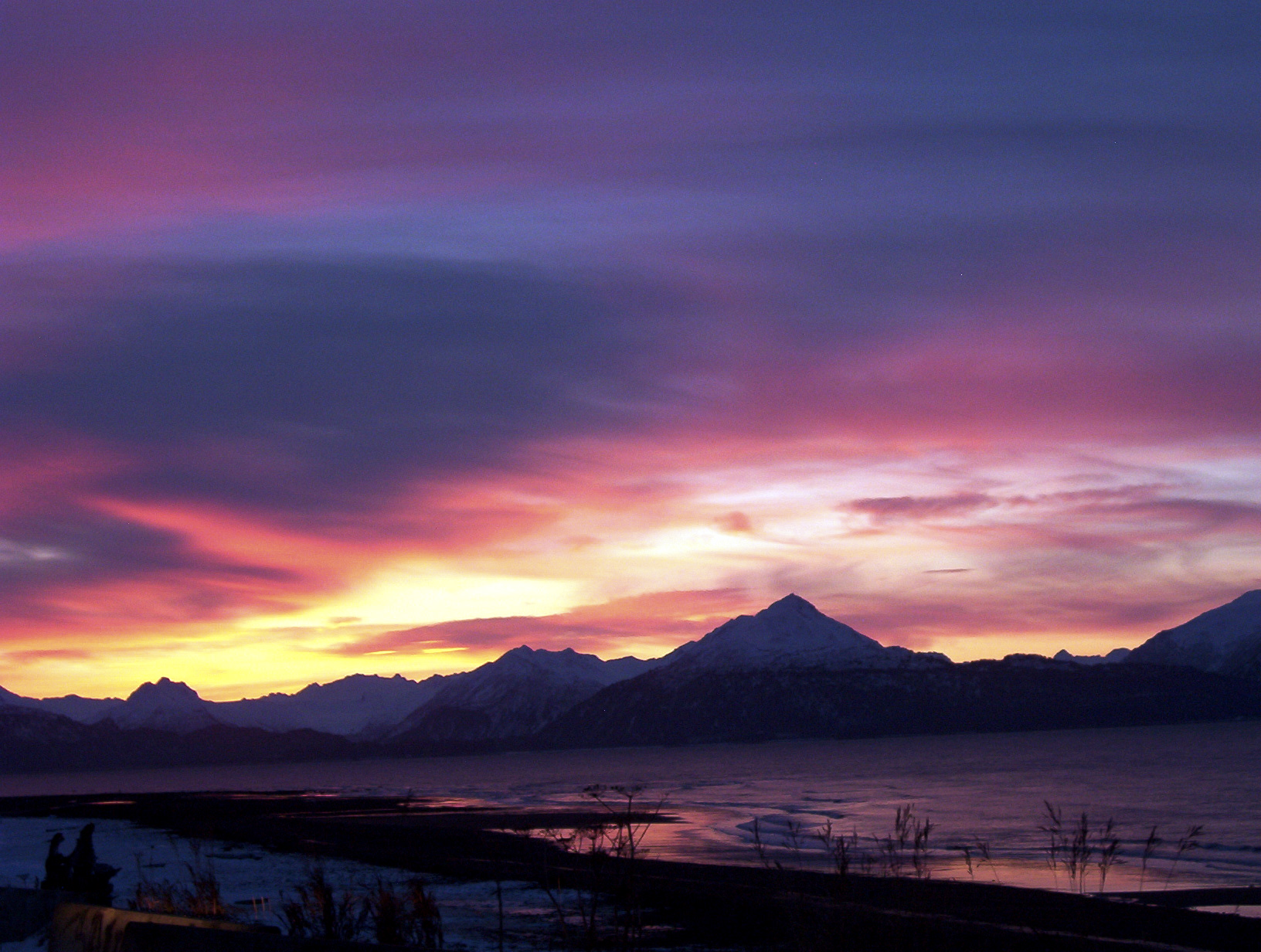
- Kachemak Bay at sunrise, 2009

- Location within Alaska
- Location: Kenai Peninsula, Alaska
- Coordinates: 59°36′33″N 151°20′51″W
- Type: Bay
- Primary inflows: Fox River, Sheep River, Grewingk River, Wosnesenski River, Seldovia River, Bradley River, Portlock River, Martin River, English Bay River
- Basin countries: United States
- Max. length: 40 mi (64 km)
- Max. width: 6 mi (9.7 km)
- Average depth: 150 ft (46 m)
- Max. depth: 576 ft (176 m)
- Islands: Chugachik Island, Bear Island, Ismailof Island, San Juan Island, Herring Islands, Cohen Island, Yukon Island, Hesketh Island, Grass Island, Powder Island, Gull Island, Mermaid Island
- Sections/sub-basins: Bear Cove, Mallard Bay, Aurora Lagoon, Halibut Cove, Halibut Cove Lagoon, Peterson Bay, China Poot Bay, Neptune Bay, Sadie Cove, Eldred Passage, Tutka Bay, Little Tutka Bay, Jakolof Bay, Kasitsna Bay, Seldovia Bay, Port Graham, English Bay
- Settlements: Homer, Halibut Cove, Seldovia, Nanwalek, Port Graham, Kachemak City, Fox River Voznesenka, Kachemak Selo, Razdolna

Kachemak Bay (Dena'ina: Tika Kaq’) is a 40-mi-long (64 km) arm of Cook Inlet in the U.S. state of Alaska, located on the southwest side of the Kenai Peninsula. The communities of Homer, Halibut Cove, Seldovia, Nanwalek, Port Graham, and Kachemak City are on the bay as well as three Old Believer settlements in the Fox River area, Voznesenka, Kachemak Selo, and Razdolna.

One interpretation of the word "Kachemak" is "Smokey Bay" which supposedly is from an Alutiiq word describing the smoldering coal seams that used to fill the bay with smoke.

== Features ==
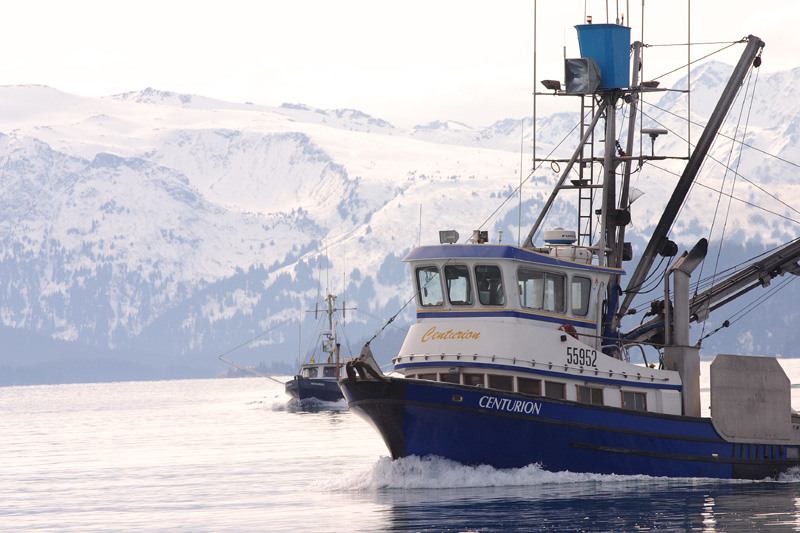
Fishing boats on Kachemak Bay

Kachemak Bay is home to Alaska's only state wilderness park, Kachemak Bay State Park. Kachemak Bay State park was the first state park in Alaska. There is no road access to most of the park; visitors must arrive by airplane or boat.

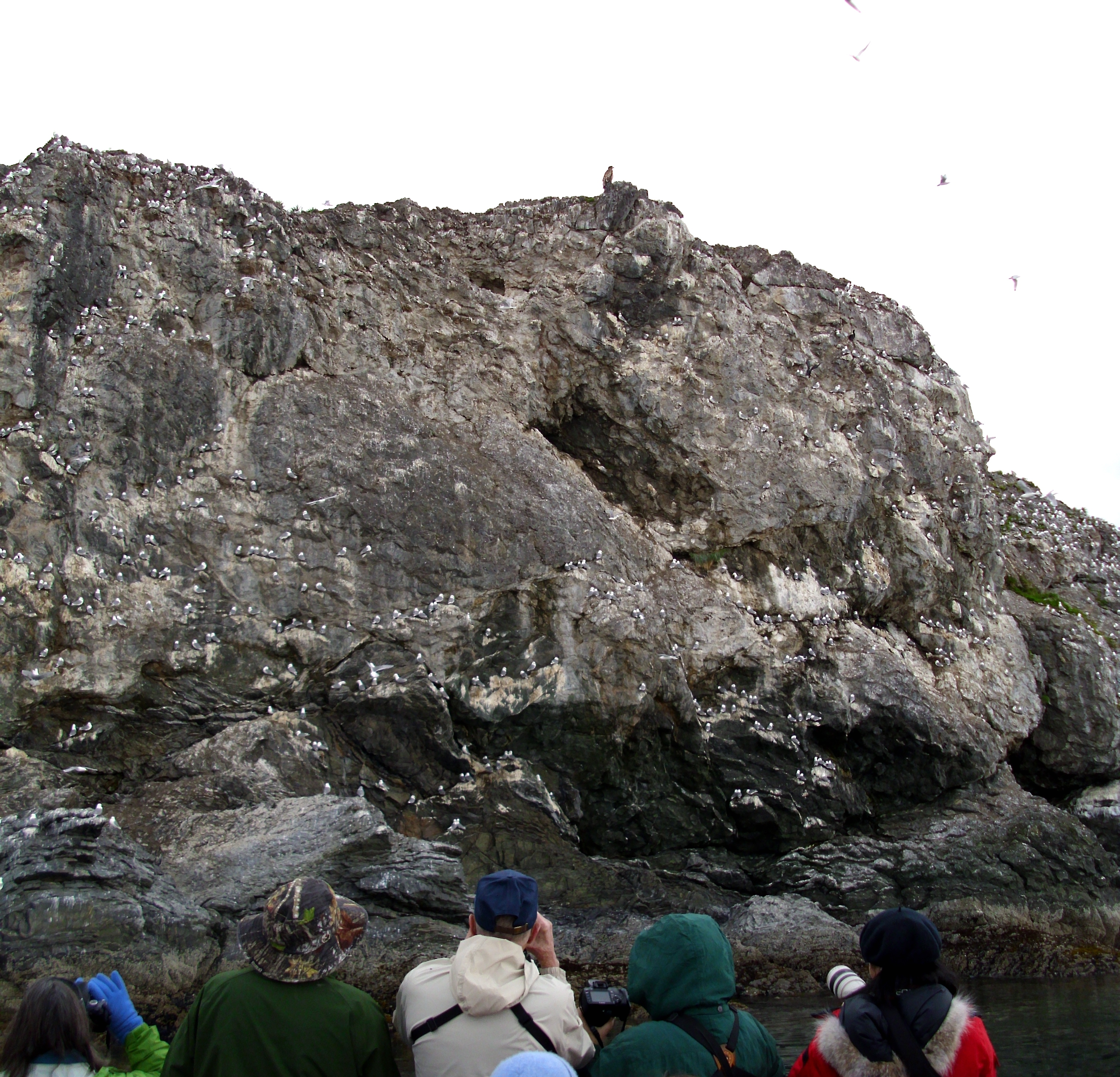
A juvenile bald eagle (at top of the photo) is hunting at a Gull Island bird rookery. In the foreground are visitors observing seabirds. May 2011

Kachemak Bay is also home to the Kachemak Bay National Estuarine Research Reserve, the largest reserve in the National Estuarine Research Reserve System. It is a very active site of research and education. The bay hosts a remarkably high level of biological activity, due in part to water circulation patterns which keep shellfish larvae and nutrients in the bay. While surface waters push nutrients out into the bay, ocean currents push them back into the bay, creating a very fertile environment. Both fish and shellfish are abundant in the bay, year-round. Waterfowl and shorebirds occupy the bay during all but the winter season, while water birds and marine mammals including otters, seals, porpoise, and whales remain in the bay all year. The bay provides winter homes for 90% of the seabird and waterfowl populations of Lower Cook Inlet. Moose, coyote, and bears are frequently seen in warmer months.

The tides at Kachemak Bay are extreme, with an average vertical difference (also called mean range) of 15.53 ft (4.73 m), and recorded extremes of 31.72 ft (9.67 m) as measured at the Seldovia Tide Station. The highest tide on record is 25.25 ft (7.70 m) above MLLW (mean lower low water) and occurred on November 15, 1966. The lowest tide on record is −6.4 ft (−2.0 m) from MLLW and occurred on April 27, 2002.

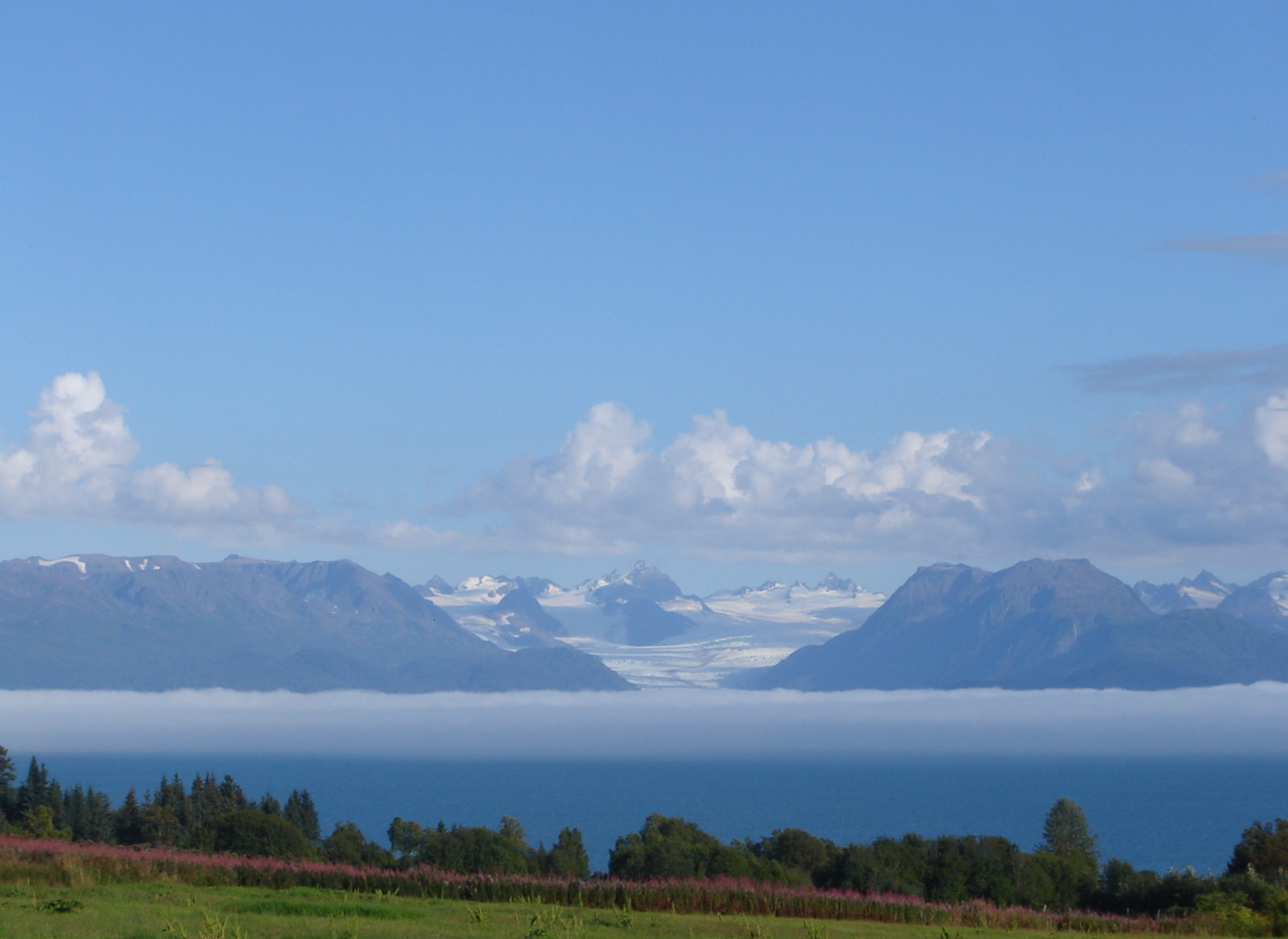
Fog bank over Kachemak Bay

== See also ==
- Kachemak Bay Campus
- Kachemak Bay State Park
