= Sarah Vance (politician) =

American politician

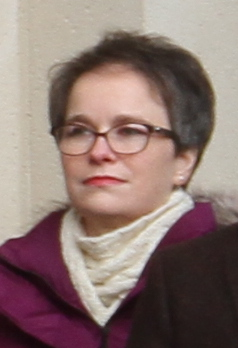

Member of the Alaska House of Representatives
- Incumbent
- Assumed office January 16, 2019
- Preceded by: Paul Seaton
- Succeeded by: Brent Johnson (elect)
- Constituency: 31st district (2019–2023); 6th district (2023–present)

Personal details
- Born: August 18, 1979 (age 47) Texas, U.S.
- Party: Republican
- Spouse: Jeff Vance
- Education: Kenai Peninsula College (KPC)

Sarah L. Vance (born August 18, 1979) is an American politician from Alaska. Vance is a Republican member of the Alaska House of Representatives, representing the 6th district.

== Political career ==
Sarah Vance began her political career as Co-Chair and spokesperson for Heartbeat of Homer, a local recall campaign against three members of the Homer City Council in Homer, Alaska. The group campaigned to recall 3 members of the Homer City Council over transparency complaints. The group accused the city council members Donna Aderhold, David Lewis, and Catriona Reynolds of lying to the public about the intention behind an "inclusivity resolution", which the group alleges was an attempt to declare Homer a sanctuary city. All three council members retained their seats by wide margins.

Vance ran for the Homer City Council in 2017, finishing third.

Vance defeated incumbent Representative Paul Seaton in the 2018 general election.

Vance announced she was running for re-election on November 3, 2020. Running against Vance as an undeclared candidate was Kenai Peninsula Borough Assembly President Kelly Cooper.

Vance retained her seat until being narrowly defeated by independent candidate Brent Johnson in 2026.

== Electoral history ==
=== 2024 ===
==== Primary ====
2024 Nonpartisan primary
| Party | Candidate | Votes | % |
|---|---|---|---|
| Republican | Sarah Vance (incumbent) | 1,998 | 43.2 |
| Independent | Brent Johnson | 1,569 | 34.0 |
| Independent | Alana Greear (withdrew) | 790 | 17.1 |
| Republican | Dawson Slaughter | 265 | 5.7 |
| Total votes | | 4,622 | 100.0 |

After the primary election, Alana Greear withdrew from the race and endorsed fellow Independent Brent Johnson.

==== General ====
2024 Alaska House of Representatives general election, District 6
| Party | Candidate | First choice | | | Round 1 | | | Round 2 | |
| Party | Candidate | Votes | % | Transfer | Votes | % | Transfer | Votes | % |
|---|---|---|---|---|---|---|---|---|---|
| Republican | Sarah Vance (incumbent) | 5,360 | 47.0% | +3 | 5,363 | 47.0% | +275 | 5,638 | 52.3% |
| Independent | Brent Johnson | 4,956 | 43.4% | +9 | 4,965 | 43.5% | +185 | 5,150 | 47.7% |
| Republican | Dawson R. Slaughter | 1,074 | 9.4% | +4 | 1,078 | 9.5% | 1,078 | Eliminated | |
| Write-in | | 27 | 0.2% | 27 | Eliminated | | | | |
| Total votes | | 11,417 | | | 11,406 | | | 10,788 | |
| Blank or inactive ballots | | | | | 392 | | +618 | 1,010 | |
