= National Register of Historic Places listings in Kenai Peninsula Borough, Alaska =

Location of the Kenai Peninsula Borough in Alaska

This is a list of the National Register of Historic Places listings in Kenai Peninsula Borough, Alaska.

This is intended to be a complete list of the properties and districts on the National Register of Historic Places in Kenai Peninsula Borough, Alaska, United States. The locations of National Register properties and districts for which the latitude and longitude coordinates are included below, may be seen in an online map.

There are 38 properties and districts listed on the National Register in the borough, including two National Historic Landmarks.

This National Park Service list is complete through NPS recent listings posted July 17, 2026.

== Current listings ==
	Name on the Register	Image	Date listed	Location	City or town	Description
1	Alaska Central Railroad: Tunnel No. 1	Alaska Central Railroad: Tunnel No. 1	November 28, 1977 (#77001576)	About 40 miles (64 km) north of Seward, in Placer River valley 60°39′14″N 149°03′28″W	Seward	
2	Alaska Nellie's Homestead	Alaska Nellie's Homestead	April 3, 1975 (#75002159)	Mile 23 on the Seward Highway; 60°24′04″N 149°21′53″W	Lawing	
3	Ballaine House	Ballaine House	July 12, 1978 (#78003429)	437 3rd Avenue; 60°06′23″N 149°26′33″W	Seward	
4	Andrew Berg Cabin	Andrew Berg Cabin	April 21, 2000 (#00000385)	About 30 miles (48 km) southeast of Soldotna, on Tustumena Lake; 60°07′03″N 150°37′48″W	Soldotna vicinity	
5	Brown & Hawkins Store	Brown & Hawkins Store	June 23, 1988 (#88000710)	205, 207, and 209 4th Avenue; 60°06′05″N 149°26′27″W	Seward	
6	Chugachik Island Site		August 19, 1976 (#76002279)	Address restricted	Kachemak Bay	
7	Church of the Assumption of the Virgin Mary	Church of the Assumption of the Virgin Mary	May 10, 1970 (#70000898)	Corner of Mission Street and Overland Street; 60°33′11″N 151°16′03″W	Kenai	
8	Clam Cove Pictograph Site	Clam Cove Pictograph Site	December 22, 2017 (#100001904)	Address restricted	Port Alsworth	
9	Coal Village Site		November 21, 1978 (#78003424)	Coal Cove, about 4 miles (6.4 km) northwest of Port Graham; 59°23′54″N 151°54′06″W	Port Graham	
10	Cooper Landing Historic District		August 21, 1986 (#86001475)	Mile 48.7 of Sterling Highway; 60°29′21″N 149°49′57″W	Cooper Landing	
11	Cooper Landing Post Office	Cooper Landing Post Office	May 23, 1978 (#78003425)	Sterling Highway; 60°29′25″N 149°49′57″W	Cooper Landing	
12	Diversion Tunnel	Diversion Tunnel	November 23, 1977 (#77001577)	At end of Lowell Canyon Road, on Lowell Creek. 60°06′11″N 149°27′09″W	Seward	US Corps of Engineers tunnel that diverts Lowell Creek under Bear Mountain
13	Fort McGilvray Historic District		December 27, 2022 (#100007802)	Caines Head State Recreation Area; 59°59′13″N 149°23′25″W	Seward vicinity	
14	Government Cable Office	Government Cable Office	January 4, 1980 (#80004574)	218 6th Avenue; 60°06′07″N 149°26′15″W	Seward	
15	Hirshey Mine		September 13, 1978 (#78003419)	About 12 miles (19 km) southeast of Hope, on Palmer Creek Road; 60°47′33″N 149°31′54″W	Hope	
16	Hoben Park	Hoben Park	June 21, 2006 (#06000515)	401 Railway Avenue; 60°06′01″N 149°26′23″W	Seward	
17	Victor Holm Cabin		April 13, 1977 (#77001573)	About 2.5 miles (4.0 km) northwest of Kasilof, on Cohoe Road, near the bank of Kasilof River; 60°22′08″N 151°18′13″W	Kenai vicinity (Note: Even if Cohoe, Alaska is the nearest census designated place, NRHP registration form mention Kenai for Victor Holm Cabin location)	1890 cabin built by pioneering homesteader Victor Holm
18	Victor Holm Homestead		January 17, 2006 (#05000032)	About 2.5 miles (4.0 km) northwest of Kasilof, on Cohoe Road, near the bank of Kasilof River; 60°22′09″N 151°18′13″W	Kasilof (Note: Even if Cohoe, Alaska is the nearest census designated place, NRHP registration form mention Kasilof for Victor Holm Homestead location)	Encompasses entire Victor Holm property, including Victor Holm Cabin and other outbuildings
19	Holy Transfiguration of Our Lord Chapel	Holy Transfiguration of Our Lord Chapel	May 22, 1978 (#78003426)	Orthodox Avenue, Mile 135 of Sterling Highway; 60°03′01″N 151°39′55″W	Ninilchik	
20	Hope Historic District	Hope Historic District	April 25, 1972 (#72001583)	Roughly bounded by Main Street, Hope Highway, Fifth Street and the Turnagain Arm; 60°55′07″N 149°38′27″W	Hope	
21	Harry A. Johnson Trapline Cabin		May 5, 2000 (#00000424)	About 15 miles (24 km) southwest of Hope; 60°45′21″N 149°56′46″W	Hope	
22	Lauritsen Cabin		October 16, 1979 (#79003761)	About 13.5 miles (21.7 km) northwest of Moose Pass, along west bank of Lake Creek; 60°40′22″N 149°28′27″W	Moose Pass	
23	Jesse Lee Home for Children		September 29, 1995 (#95001146)	Benson Drive; 60°07′34″N 149°26′47″W	Seward	
24	Magnetic Island Site		March 17, 2015 (#15000071)	Address restricted	Port Alsworth	
25	Moose River Site		December 20, 1978 (#78003427)	Address restricted	Sterling	
26	St. Nicholas Chapel	St. Nicholas Chapel	June 6, 1980 (#80004588)	Church Street; 59°26′22″N 151°42′59″W	Seldovia	
27	St. Peter's Episcopal Church	St. Peter's Episcopal Church	December 21, 1979 (#79003762)	239 2nd Avenue; 60°06′10″N 149°26′39″W	Seward	
28	Sts. Sergius and Herman of Valaam Church	Sts. Sergius and Herman of Valaam Church	June 6, 1980 (#80004587) (Note: There's an error in NRHP listing for this building. Listing 80004587 attached form and pictures refer to Sts. Sergius and Herman of Valaam Chapel in Ouzinkie. The correct form and pictures for this building are attached to listing 80004581 (form and pictures))	Nicholas Street; 59°21′18″N 151°55′16″W	Nanwalek	1930 Russian Orthodox Church (next to more recent one).
29	Selenie Lagoon Archeological Site		October 16, 1974 (#74002321)	Address restricted	Port Graham	
30	Seward Depot	Seward Depot	July 16, 1987 (#87000652)	501 Railway Avenue; 60°06′03″N 149°26′20″W	Seward	
31	Snug Harbor Packing Company	Snug Harbor Packing Company	September 11, 2023 (#100009319)	Chisik Island; 60°06′30″N 152°34′51″W	Tuxnedi Wilderness Area, Alaska Maritime National Wildlife Refuge	
32	Soldotna Post Office	Soldotna Post Office	September 17, 2008 (#08000904)	Corner of East Corral Avenue and Kenai Spur Highway; 60°29′34″N 151°04′05″W	Soldotna	
33	Sunrise City Historic District	Sunrise City Historic District	August 19, 1997 (#97000892)	At the mouth of Sixmile Creek, east of Hope; 60°53′20″N 149°25′16″W	Hope	
34	Swetman House	Swetman House	February 17, 1978 (#78003430)	325 5th Avenue; 60°06′15″N 149°26′21″W	Seward	
35	Thorn-Stingley House	Thorn-Stingley House	February 2, 2001 (#01000023)	1660 East End Road; 59°39′23″N 151°30′02″W	Homer	
36	Tuxedni Bay Pictograph Site	Tuxedni Bay Pictograph Site	August 11, 2020 (#100001776)	Address Restricted	Port Alsworth vicinity	
37	Van Gilder Hotel	Van Gilder Hotel	December 2, 1980 (#80004575)	307 Adams Street; 60°06′11″N 149°26′28″W	Seward	
38	Yukon Island Main Site	Yukon Island Main Site	October 15, 1966 (#66000955)	Yukon Island, 9 miles south of Homer; 59°31′20″N 151°29′54″W	Homer	

== See also ==
- List of National Historic Landmarks in Alaska
- National Register of Historic Places listings in Alaska
