= Andrew Berg =

American pioneer (1869–1939)

Andrew Berg (Anders Berg; October 16, 1869 — March 1, 1939) was an immigrant to the District of Alaska who was a prominent fisher, hunter, and trapper. He became the first licensed big game guide in Alaska.

== Early life and emigration ==
Andrew Berg was born Anders Berg on October 16, 1869, in Nykarleby, Finland, then part of the Russian Empire. His father Johan and mother Lovisa owned a small farm. The family also hunted and fished. Because of extreme poverty, Andrew left Finland in 1887 at the age of 16. Along with two other boys from his town, Berg sailed to Hull in England, before travelling to Liverpool by train. He was one of 500 emigrants that were to sail to New York City aboard the St. Andreas. Because of a cholera outbreak, the ship instead sailed to Quebec. The boys travelled to Chicago, then to Michigan City, Indiana, where they obtained work at a sawmill.

After working at the mill for a short time, Berg travelled to his uncle Erik's home in San Francisco. Berg travelled to the Kenai Peninsula in Alaska, likely with his uncle, and took a job at a salmon cannery. Living in the village of Kenai, Berg spent his winters trapping and fished for the Alaska Packers' Association during the summer.

== Hunting and guiding ==
I have been here since 1890, and all the caribou on Kenai have never reached 1,500. I saw two last spring, and perhaps the only two left. The caribou have not been killed, but have disappeared. They certainly have not left the place, as there is nowhere to go, but ever since we killed off the wolves the moose began to increase and with the increase of moose the caribou died off.

— Andrew Berg, June 1911 issue of Outdoor Life

In addition to fishing and trapping, Berg became involved in hunting and exploring in the Kenai Peninsula. During the late 19th century, large moose antlers made their way to the Lower 48 and trophy hunting became a popular business on the Peninsula. A picture of a set of antlers measuring 73.25 inches (1.861 m) taken by Berg and acquired by a dealer in Tacoma, Washington, was published in Field and Stream in March 1897. After seeing the picture and desiring to discover who had collected the antlers, Dall DeWeese, a wealthy entrepreneur from Colorado with an interest in hunting and wildlife, became the first known person to travel to the Peninsula to hunt. In September 1897, DeWeese found Berg at the cannery where he worked and arranged his release to serve as a guide. On their trip, DeWeese killed eight Dall sheep, two bears, and three moose with antler spreads ranging from 58 to 69 inches. DeWeese published articles about his expedition in at least three journals.

DeWeese returned in 1898, 1899, and 1901, noticing decreased populations of wildlife as a result of the new interest and lack of hunting regulations in the region. He wrote a letter to President Theodore Roosevelt in 1901, asking for regulations and conservation in Alaska.

Following surveys of the region, regulations were established in 1908 that required game wardens, bag limits, and licensed guides. Berg was issued license "No. 1", which he held for over twenty years. He later served as a warden from 1920 to 1921, and worked for the United States Fish and Wildlife Service from 1924 until 1936.

== Later life and death ==
Berg retired from guiding in 1929, as the Great Depression led to fewer hunting trips and decreased fur prices. In February 1939, Berg was found ill in bed at one of his cabins. He was flown to a hospital in Anchorage, where he died on March 1, 1939, after suffering from heart and kidney problems for ten years.

== Cabins ==
Berg built a total of 11 log cabins on the Kenai Peninsula. He built his first, which served as his home, in 1902 on Tustumena Lake. Berg used spruce logs to construct the home cabin, which measures 17 feet wide by 17 feet long. The cabin is located within what is now the Kenai National Wildlife Refuge and was added to the National Register of Historic Places in 2000 as Andrew Berg Cabin. Also in the Refuge is Berg's last cabin, built in 1935, also on Tustumena Lake. In 2000 the cabin was disassembled and moved next to the Refuge's visitor center. The 1935 cabin is open to the public.

== See also ==
- National Register of Historic Places listings in Kenai Peninsula Borough, Alaska
