= Victor Holm Homestead =

Historic house in Alaska, United States

- U.S. National Register of Historic Places
- U.S. Historic district
- Location within Alaska
- Location: End of Cohoe Road, near the bank of Kasilof River
- Nearest city: Kasilof, Alaska
- Coordinates: 60°22′9″N 151°18′13″W
- Area: 1.4 acres (0.57 ha)
- Built: 1890
- Built by: Holm, Victor
- NRHP reference No.: 05000032
- Added to NRHP: January 17, 2006

- Victor Holm Cabin
- U.S. National Register of Historic Places
- U.S. Historic district – Contributing property
- Alaska Heritage Resources Survey
- Location: End of Cohoe Road, near the bank of Kasilof River
- Nearest city: Kasilof, Alaska
- Coordinates: 60°22′8″N 151°18′13″W
- Area: less than one acre
- Built: 1890
- Built by: Victor Holm
- Part of: Victor Holm Homestead (ID05000032)
- NRHP reference No.: 77001573
- AHRS No.: KEN-038

Significant dates
- Added to NRHP: April 13, 1977
- Designated CP: January 17, 2006
- Designated AHRS: August 14, 1972

The Victor Holm Homestead is a historic late 19th-century homestead property in Kasilof, Alaska. The 1.4-acre (0.57 ha) property is located on Cohoe Road, on the west bank of the Kasilof River. The property was settled in about 1890 by Victor Holm, who built a rough log cabin on the property then, and later a more refined log structure in 1915. He also built a wellhouse, outhouse, and food storage cache that have survived. His original cabin was listed on the National Register of Historic Places as the Victor Holm Cabin in 1977; this cabin was moved away from an eroding bluff in 2011 by the Kachemak Heritage Land Trust. The property is now owned by the Kachemak Regional Historic Association.

The entire property was listed on the National Register of Historic Places in 2006.

== See also ==
- National Register of Historic Places listings in Kenai Peninsula Borough, Alaska
