= Van Gilder Hotel =

- U.S. National Register of Historic Places
- Alaska Heritage Resources Survey
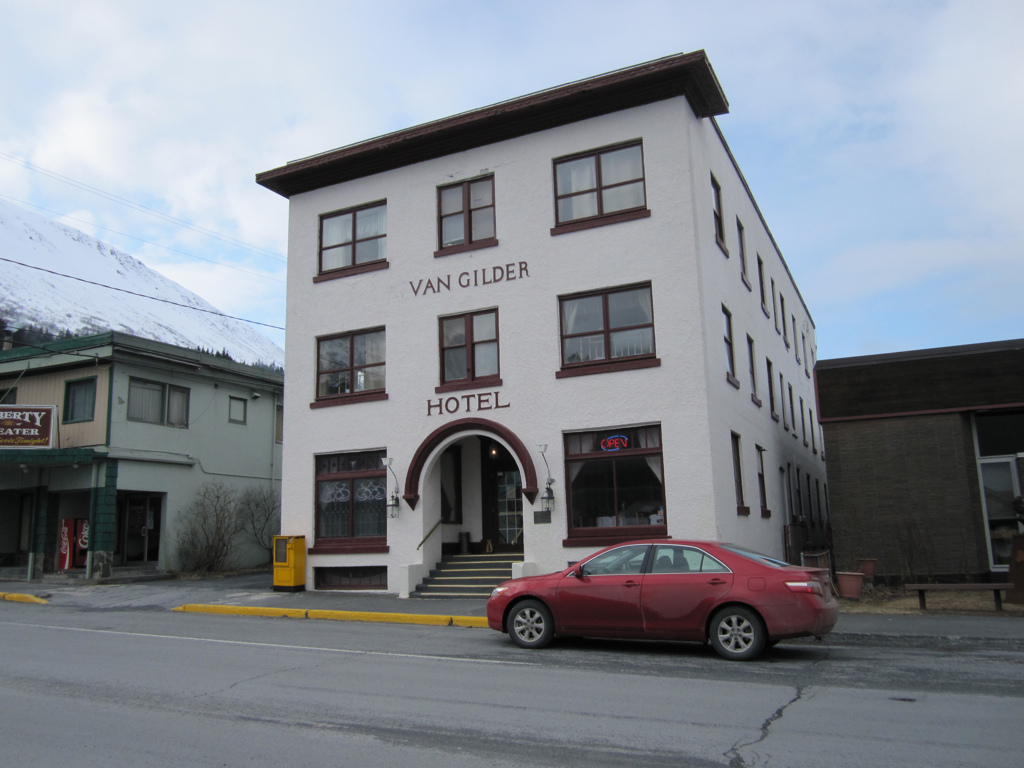

- Location within Alaska
- Location: 307 Adams Street, Seward, Alaska
- Coordinates: 60°6′11″N 149°26′28″W
- Area: less than one acre
- Built: 1916
- Built by: E.L. Van Gilder
- Architect: William Kingsley
- NRHP reference No.: 80004575
- AHRS No.: SEW-160

Significant dates
- Added to NRHP: December 2, 1980
- Designated AHRS: April 15, 1968

The Van Gilder Hotel is a historic multipurpose commercial and civic building at 307 Adams Street in Seward, Alaska, United States.

== Construction ==
The building was originally constructed as an office by E.L. Van Gilder of Kellogg, Idaho, who decided to invest in the Alaska Territory. Van Gilder purchased the property adjacent to the Seward bank for $4,000 in February 1916. He obtained supplies in Idaho, and then returned to Seward via the steamer Evans with his wife and daughter. Construction for the two-story structure with an excavated basement began in May 1916. In addition to offices, the building would have meeting halls for local organizations. During construction, Van Gilder decided to add a third story to the building. Extra construction costs and a poor economy forced Van Gilder to sell the building shortly after it was completed. The new building was purchased by Charles Brown, a partner in the Brown & Hawkins Store in Seward.

The Van Gilders planned to return to the states and travelled to Ketchikan, Alaska, via boat. While in the town waiting for the boat to leave, Van Gilder and his wife Sarah were both offered jobs. They stayed for a year and earned money to invest in business in St. Helens, Oregon.

== Rooms and Guests ==
Upon completion, the first and second floors contained 27 rooms, while the basement had seven. The third floor held a Masonic and Odd Fellows lodge rooms, as well as meeting space for the Christian Scientists and the Seward Women's Club. Tenants on the lower floor included the law firm Morford & Finnigan, a doctor, and the Alaska Importing Company. The basement held offices for the Gateway Newspaper. The newspaper was the second in Alaska to join the Associated Press and had been called the second-largest paper in Alaska in 1915.

In early 1921 the building was converted to apartments. Joe Badger, who came to Alaska from Chelsea, Massachusetts during the gold rush in Nome, served as manager. Badger took over ownership in September, and had the building converted again, this time to serve as a hotel. Early guests to the hotel included salesman, railroad, and government officials including Austin E. Lathrop, a prominent Alaskan industrialist. In 1923 when Warren G. Harding became the first U.S. president to visit the territory, many of the executives stayed in the Van Gilder.

In 1924, Seward and the Van Gilder were a stop for the Army Air Service team that made the first aerial circumnavigation of the globe. The four pilots and their crews landed their Douglas World Cruiser aircraft—the Boston, Chicago, New Orleans, and Seattle—in Resurrection Bay. The event was the first time many of the 1,000 residents saw an airplane.

== Varied Owners ==
Ownership passed hands several more times, and the hotel was known as "Hotel Renwald" during parts of the 1950s and 1960s. For a time the building was leased to the state and served as a dormitory for the Seward Skills Center. When the state's lease expired in 1978 the building was refurbished and has served as a hotel since.

The building was added to the National Register of Historic Places in 1980.

== See also ==
- National Register of Historic Places listings in Kenai Peninsula Borough, Alaska
