= Selenie Lagoon Archeological Site =

Archaeological site in Alaska, United States

- U.S. National Register of Historic Places
- Alaska Heritage Resources Survey
- Location: Address restricted
- Nearest city: Port Graham, Alaska
- Area: 1 acre (0.40 ha)
- NRHP reference No.: 74002321
- AHRS No.: SEL-064
- Added to NRHP: October 16, 1974

The Selenie Lagoon Archeological Site is a prehistoric archaeological site near Port Graham, Alaska. The site encompasses a fairly large and deeply-stratified shell midden on the north shore of the Port Graham inlet. The site is expected to yield a fairly complete sequence of artifacts relating to the history of human habitation of the inlet.

The site was listed on the National Register of Historic Places in 1974.

== See also ==
- National Register of Historic Places listings in Kenai Peninsula Borough, Alaska
