= Lauritsen =

Lauritsen is a surname. Notable people with this surname include:

- Charles Christian Lauritsen, Danish-American physicist
- Børge Johannes Lauritsen, Danish merchant
- Janet Lauritsen, American criminologist
- Rasmus Lauritsen, Danish footballer

== See also ==
- Lauritsen (crater), a crater on the Moon
- Lauritsen Cabin, a cabin in Alaska
