= Cohoe, Alaska =

Cohoe, Alaska Qughuhnaz’ut
- Census-designated place
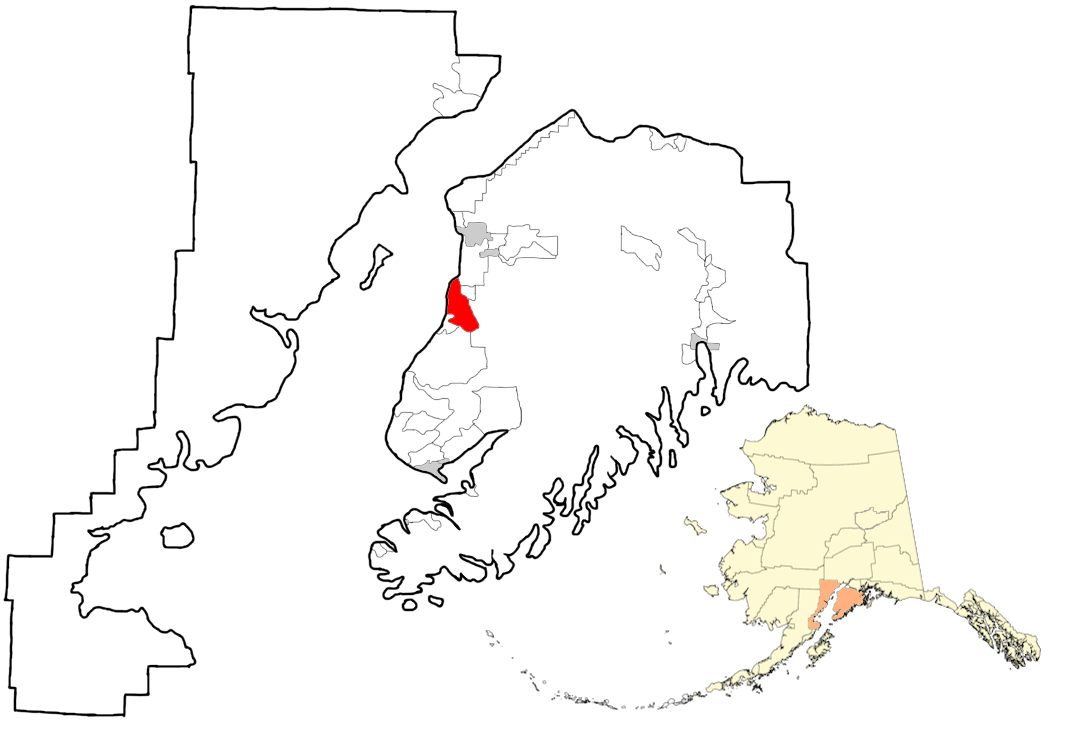
- Location in Kenai Peninsula Borough, Alaska
- Coordinates: 60°18′5″N 151°17′45″W
- Country: United States
- State: Alaska
- Borough: Kenai Peninsula

Government
  - Borough mayor: Peter Micciche
  - State senator: Gary Stevens (R)
  - State rep.: Sarah Vance (R)

Area
  - Total: 73.37 sq mi (190.03 km^{2})
  - Land: 69.91 sq mi (181.06 km^{2})
  - Water: 3.46 sq mi (8.97 km^{2})
- Elevation: 56 ft (17 m)

Population (2020)
  - Total: 1,471
  - Density: 21.0/sq mi (8.12/km^{2})
- Time zone: UTC-9 (Alaska (AKST))
  - Summer (DST): UTC-8 (AKDT)
- Area code: 907
- FIPS code: 02-16420
- GNIS feature ID: 1412828

Cohoe (Dena'ina: Qughuhnaz’ut) is a census-designated place (CDP) in Kenai Peninsula Borough, Alaska, United States. As of the 2020 census, Cohoe had a population of 1,471.

== Geography ==
Cohoe is located on the western side of the Kenai Peninsula at 60°18′5″N 151°17′45″W (60.301277, -151.295952). It is bordered to the west by Cook Inlet, to the south by Clam Gulch and Ninilchik, to the east by the outlet of Tustumena Lake, and to the northeast by the Kasilof River and the communities of Kasilof and Kalifornsky.

Alaska Route 1 (Sterling Highway) passes through Cohoe, leading northeast 15 miles (24 km) to Soldotna and south 59 miles (95 km) to Homer.

According to the United States Census Bureau, the CDP has a total area of 73.3 square miles (189.9 km^{2}), of which 69.8 square miles (180.9 km^{2}) are land and 3.5 square miles (9.0 km^{2}), or 4.73%, are water.

== Demographics ==
Historical population
Census	Pop.	Note	%±
1960	122		—
1990	508		—
2000	1,168		129.9%
2010	1,364		16.8%
2020	1,471		7.8%
U.S. Decennial Census

Cohoe first appeared on the 1960 U.S. Census as an unincorporated village. It did not appear again until 1990 when it was made a census-designated place (CDP).

=== 2020 census ===
As of the 2020 census, Cohoe had a population of 1,471. The median age was 50.8 years. 17.1% of residents were under the age of 18 and 24.6% of residents were 65 years of age or older. For every 100 females there were 121.5 males, and for every 100 females age 18 and over there were 118.1 males age 18 and over.

0.0% of residents lived in urban areas, while 100.0% lived in rural areas.

There were 669 households in Cohoe, of which 20.3% had children under the age of 18 living in them. Of all households, 53.5% were married-couple households, 24.7% were households with a male householder and no spouse or partner present, and 16.1% were households with a female householder and no spouse or partner present. About 32.7% of all households were made up of individuals and 13.2% had someone living alone who was 65 years of age or older.

There were 922 housing units, of which 27.4% were vacant. The homeowner vacancy rate was 0.8% and the rental vacancy rate was 6.4%.

Racial composition as of the 2020 census
Race	Number	Percent
White	1,232	83.8%
Black or African American	6	0.4%
American Indian and Alaska Native	78	5.3%
Asian	15	1.0%
Native Hawaiian and Other Pacific Islander	4	0.3%
Some other race	19	1.3%
Two or more races	117	8.0%
Hispanic or Latino (of any race)	33	2.2%

=== 2000 census ===
As of the census of 2000, there were 1,168 people, 445 households, and 295 families residing in the CDP. The population density was 16.7 inhabitants per square mile (6.4/km^{2}). There were 630 housing units at an average density of 9.0 per square mile (3.5/km^{2}). The racial makeup of the CDP was 90.15% White, 0.26% Black or African American, 4.54% Native American, 0.60% Asian, 0.17% Pacific Islander, 0.60% from other races, and 3.68% from two or more races. 1.71% of the population were Hispanic or Latino of any race.

There were 445 households, out of which 34.6% had children under the age of 18 living with them, 56.4% were married couples living together, 5.6% had a female householder with no husband present, and 33.7% were non-families. 26.7% of all households were made up of individuals, and 6.3% had someone living alone who was 65 years of age or older. The average household size was 2.61 and the average family size was 3.20.

In the CDP, the population was spread out, with 31.3% under the age of 18, 4.5% from 18 to 24, 28.4% from 25 to 44, 28.2% from 45 to 64, and 7.7% who were 65 years of age or older. The median age was 39 years. For every 100 females, there were 117.1 males. For every 100 females age 18 and over, there were 108.0 males.

The median income for a household in the CDP was $38,542, and the median income for a family was $44,167. Males had a median income of $40,125 versus $26,154 for females. The per capita income for the CDP was $19,059. About 8.0% of families and 12.1% of the population were below the poverty line, including 9.9% of those under age 18 and 7.9% of those age 65 or over.
