= Magnetic Island (disambiguation) =

Magnetic Island is an island in northern Queensland, Australia

Magnetic Island also refers to:

- Magnetic Island (Alaska)
- Magnetic Island (Antarctica)
