= List of bridges on the National Register of Historic Places in Alaska =

This is a list of bridges and tunnels on the National Register of Historic Places in the U.S. state of Alaska.

Name	Image	Built	Listed	Location	Borough	Type
Alaska Central Railroad Tunnel No. 1		1906, 1916	1977-11-28	Seward; 60°39′17″N 149°3′20″W	Kenai Peninsula	
Lowell Creek Diversion Tunnel		1939, 1940	1977-11-23	Seward; 60°6′14″N 149°27′9″W	Kenai Peninsula	
Miles Glacier Bridge (Million Dollar Bridge)		1910	2000-03-31	Cordova; 60°40′24″N 144°44′36″W	Valdez-Cordova (census area)	Pennsylvania through truss
Susitna River Bridge	Susitna River Bridge	1920, 1921	1977-09-15	Gold Creek; 62°46′6″N 149°41′30″W	Matanuska-Susitna	Through truss
Grant Street Trestle		1906, 1927	removed 1988-03-10	Ketchikan	Ketchikan Gateway	

== See also ==
- List of bridges in Alaska
