= Andrew Berg Cabin =

- U.S. National Register of Historic Places
- Alaska Heritage Resources Survey
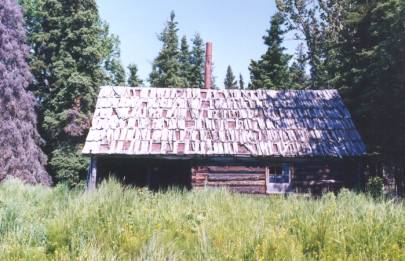

- Location within Alaska
- Location: Tustumena Lake, Kenai Peninsula Borough, Alaska
- Nearest city: Soldotna
- Coordinates: 60°7′3″N 150°37′48″W
- Area: less than one acre
- Built: 1902
- Built by: Andrew Berg
- NRHP reference No.: 00000385
- AHRS No.: KEN-00245

Significant dates
- Added to NRHP: April 21, 2000
- Designated AHRS: April 10, 1972

The Andrew Berg Cabin near Soldotna, Alaska, was built by fisherman and trapper Andrew Berg in 1902. It was listed on the National Register of Historic Places in 2000.

It is located within what is now the Kenai National Wildlife Refuge about 30 miles (48 km) southeast of Sodotna on the north shore of Tustumena Lake. It is a one-room, one-and-a-half-story single pen log cabin built of spruce logs, with sill logs laid on the ground. It is 17 by 17 feet (5.2 m × 5.2 m) in plan.

Andrew Berg built a total of 11 log cabins on the Kenai Peninsula. He built his first, which served as his home, in 1902 on Tustumena Lake. Berg used spruce logs to construct the home cabin, which measures 17 feet wide by 17 feet long. Also in the Refuge is Berg's last cabin, built in 1935, also on Tustumena Lake. In 2000 the cabin was disassembled and moved next to the Refuge's visitor center. The 1935 cabin is open to the public.

== See also ==
- National Register of Historic Places listings in Kenai Peninsula Borough, Alaska
