= Ballaine House =

Historic house in Alaska, United States

- U.S. National Register of Historic Places
- Alaska Heritage Resources Survey
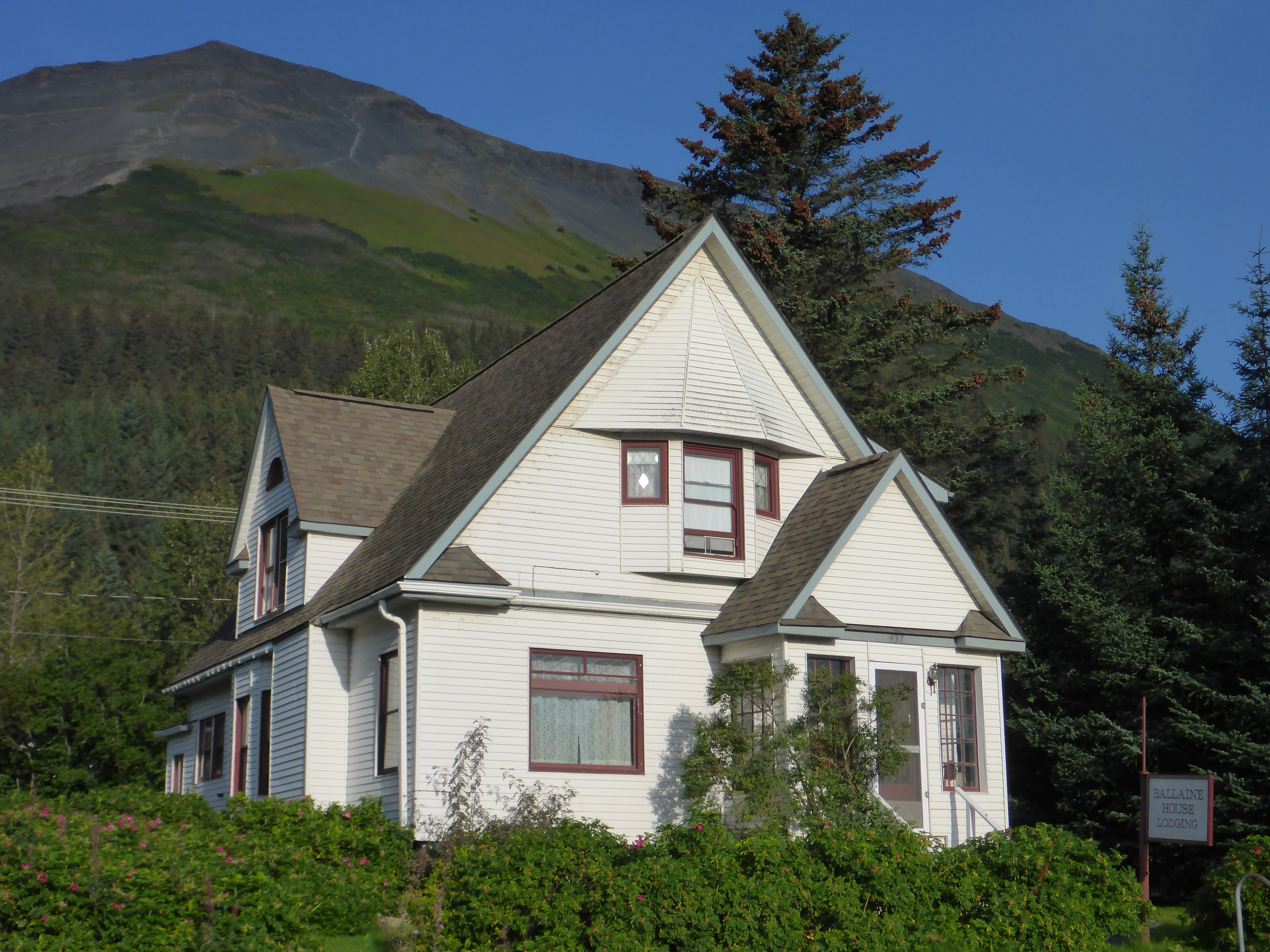

- Location within Alaska
- Location: 437 3rd Avenue, Seward, Alaska
- Coordinates: 60°6′23″N 149°26′33″W
- Area: less than one acre
- Built: 1905
- NRHP reference No.: 78003429
- AHRS No.: SEW-023

Significant dates
- Added to NRHP: July 12, 1978
- Designated AHRS: April 10, 1972

The Ballaine House is a historic homestead in Seward, Alaska, United States. The home was built in 1905 by prominent Seward businessman Frank Ballaine. Frank was the brother of John Ballaine, who is considered the founding father of Seward. The building currently houses a bed and breakfast.

== History ==
Beginning in 1902, a group of Seattle businessman sought to establish a railroad to connect southern Alaska with Fairbanks in the Interior. After crews surveyed many different routes, John Ballaine selected the northern coast of Resurrection Bay as the southern terminus of their route, as the Bay remains free of ice year-round. John Ballaine obtained much of the land for the town site. His brother Frank lived in Seward and was responsible for selling lots in the town and overseeing the railroad construction, as John remained in Seattle. Frank also founded the town's first newspaper, the Seward Gateway, in 1904. When a telegraph connection to Seward was completed, Ballaine provided news from the lower 48 states in his paper.

In 1905, Frank Ballaine married in Seattle and returned to Seward and began construction of his residence. In that same year, six other homes of similar quality were constructed on that block, and the street was nicknamed "Millionaire's Row", as the owners believed Alaska would soon have one million residents and Seward would be its "Gateway".

== Description ==
The house measured approximately 22 feet (6.7 m) by 45 feet (14 m). The first floor contains many windows, a sign of wealth, and usual for that time and location.

It was added to the National Register of Historic Places on July 12, 1978.

== See also ==
- National Register of Historic Places listings in Kenai Peninsula Borough, Alaska
