= Coal Village Site =

Archaeological site in Alaska, United States

- U.S. National Register of Historic Places
- Alaska Heritage Resources Survey
- Location within Alaska
- Nearest city: Port Graham, Alaska
- Coordinates: 59°23′54″N 151°54′6″W
- Area: 65.1 acres (26.3 ha)
- Built: 1855
- Built by: Enoch Hjalmar Furuhjelm; Russian American Company
- NRHP reference No.: 78003424
- AHRS No.: SEL-021

Significant dates
- Added to NRHP: November 21, 1978
- Designated AHRS: 1970

The Coal Village Site, also known as Coal Cove after the name of the bay south of it, is a historic archaeological site near Port Graham, Alaska. It was the location of a coal mining operation established by the Russian American Company in 1855, and was for a time the third largest settlement in Russian Alaska. An open-pit coal mine was mined until 1860, when a fire destroyed the main steam engine, and the site was abandoned in 1865. When the site was listed on the National Register of Historic Places in 1978, it was overgrown, and remnants of building foundations, a railway, and other artifacts were discernible, as was a refuse midden.

== See also ==
- National Register of Historic Places listings in Kenai Peninsula Borough, Alaska
