= Lowell Point, Alaska =

- Census-designated place
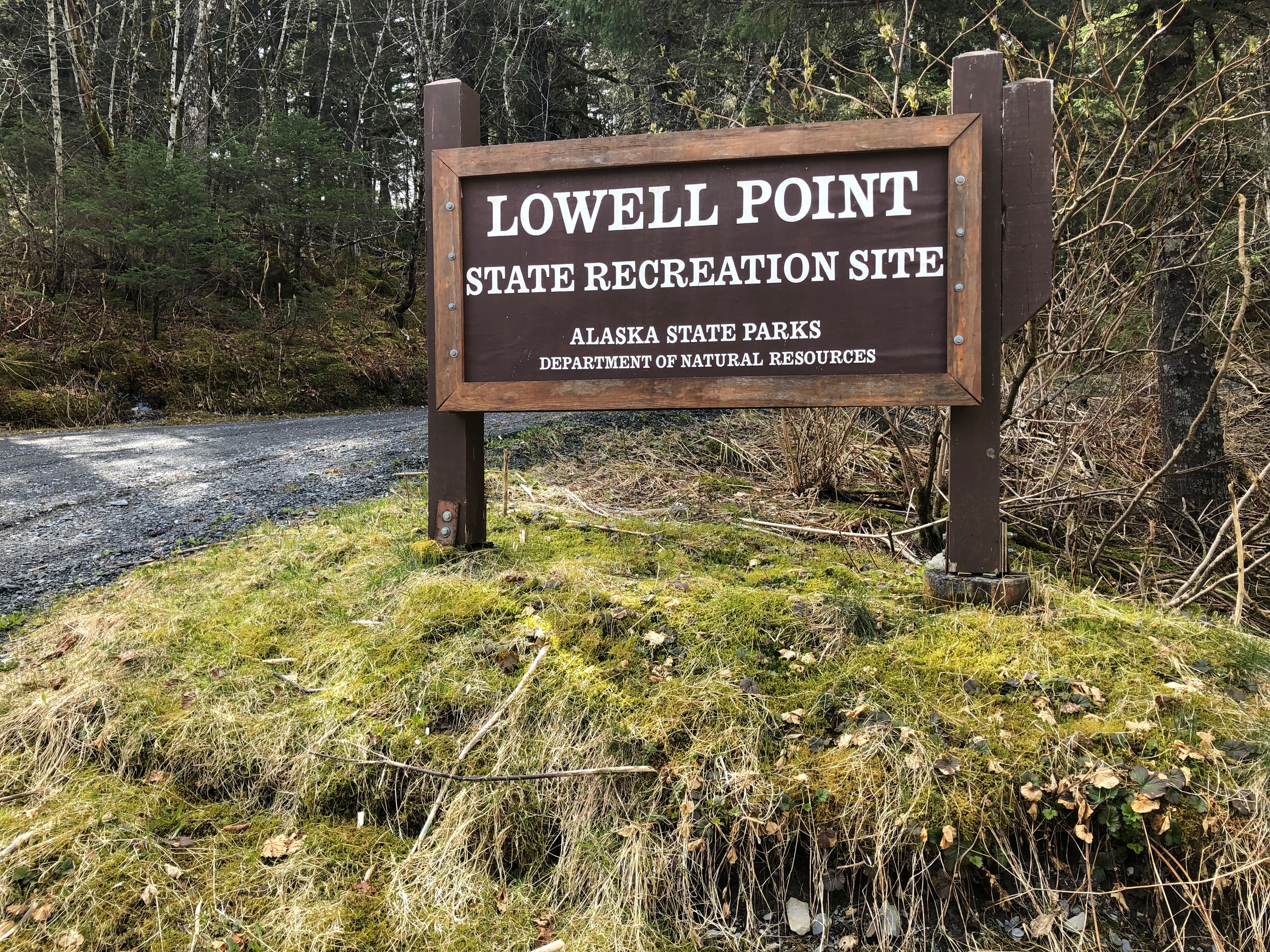
- Lowell Point Recreation Area

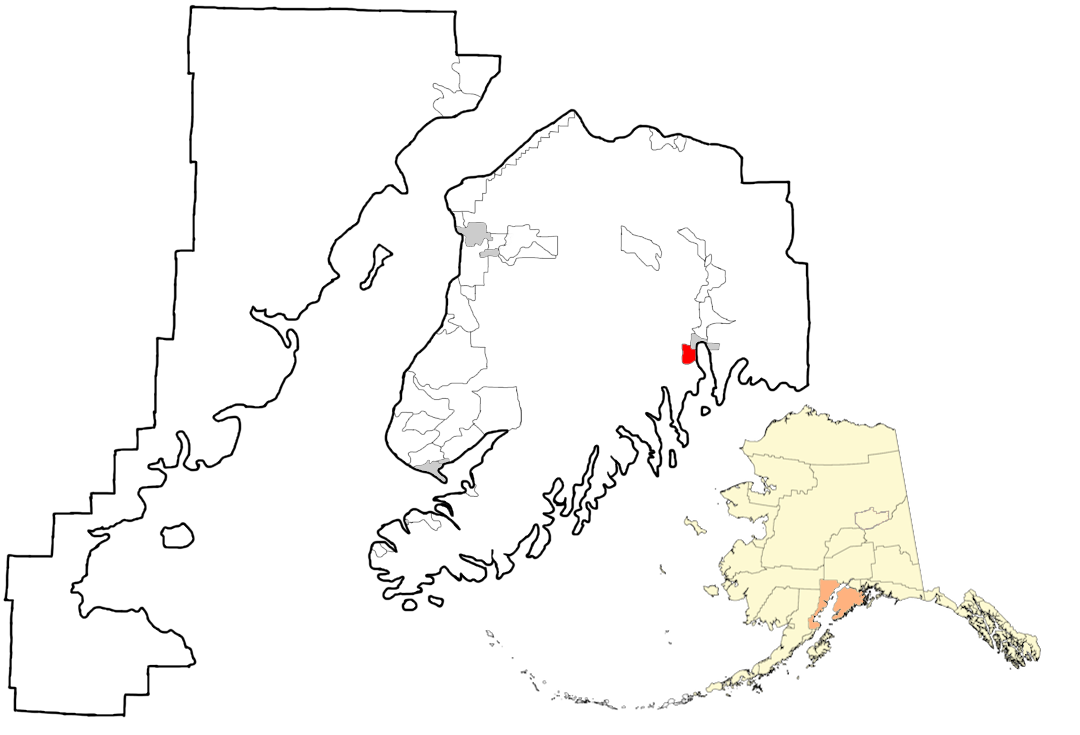
- Location in Kenai Peninsula Borough, Alaska
- Coordinates: 60°4′18″N 149°26′37″W
- Country: United States
- State: Alaska
- Borough: Kenai Peninsula

Government
  - Borough mayor: Peter Micciche
  - State senator: Gary Stevens (R)
  - State rep.: Louise Stutes (R)

Area
  - Total: 11.75 sq mi (30.43 km^{2})
  - Land: 11.73 sq mi (30.37 km^{2})
  - Water: 0.023 sq mi (0.06 km^{2})
- Elevation: 36 ft (11 m)

Population (2020)
  - Total: 79
  - Density: 6.7/sq mi (2.6/km^{2})
- Time zone: UTC-9 (Alaska (AKST))
  - Summer (DST): UTC-8 (AKDT)
- ZIP code: 99664
- Area code: 907
- FIPS code: 02-45295
- GNIS feature ID: 1865557

Lowell Point is a census-designated place (CDP) in Kenai Peninsula Borough, Alaska, United States, just outside Seward. As of the 2020 census, Lowell Point had a population of 79.

== Geography ==
Lowell Point is located on the east side of the Kenai Peninsula at 60°4′18″N 149°26′37″W (60.071557, -149.443715). It sits on the western shore of Resurrection Bay and is bordered to the northeast by the city of Seward. According to the United States Census Bureau, the CDP has a total area of 11.9 square miles (30.9 km^{2}), of which 0.02 square miles (0.06 km^{2}), or 0.18%, are water.

The only road access is Lowell Point Road, an extension of Seward's Railway Avenue which begins beyond the Seward townsite boundaries, a short distance southwest of the Alaska SeaLife Center and the southern terminus of the Seward Highway. The road is a rough gravel road running along a thin strip of flat land between the mountains and Resurrection Bay, and provides access to the CDP, and beyond to Caines Head State Recreation Area and Fort McGilvray.

Lowell Point does not have a formal harbor, as the well-developed Seward Harbor is a short distance away, but small boats can make beach landings.

== Demographics ==
Historical population
Census	Pop.	Note	%±
1890	12		—
2000	92		—
2010	80		−13.0%
2020	79		−1.2%
U.S. Decennial Census

Lowell Point first appeared on the 1890 U.S. Census as the homestead of the Captain Franklin G. Lowell family, consisting of 12 residents, 10 Whites, 1 Native & 1 Creole (mixed Native & Russian). It did not report again until 2000, when it first appeared as Lowell Point and made a census-designated place (CDP).

As of the census of 2000, there were 92 people, 39 households, and 20 families residing in the CDP. The population density was 7.8 inhabitants per square mile (3.0/km^{2}). There were 72 housing units at an average density of 6.1 per square mile (2.4/km^{2}). The racial makeup of the CDP was 92.39% White, 1.09% Black or African American, 4.35% Native American and 2.17% Asian. 2.17% of the population were Hispanic or Latino of any race.

There were 39 households, out of which 20.5% had children under the age of 18 living with them, 43.6% were married couples living together, and 48.7% were non-families. 43.6% of all households were made up of individuals, and 2.6% had someone living alone who was 65 years of age or older. The average household size was 2.00 and the average family size was 2.75.

In the CDP, the population was spread out, with 15.2% under the age of 18, 7.6% from 18 to 24, 44.6% from 25 to 44, 27.2% from 45 to 64, and 5.4% who were 65 years of age or older. The median age was 36 years. For every 100 females, there were 187.5 males. For every 100 females age 18 and over, there were 212.0 males.

The median income for a household in the CDP was $32,000, and the median income for a family was $137,566. Males had a median income of $53,750 versus $54,000 for females. The per capita income for the CDP was $45,790. There were 31.3% of families and 28.4% of the population living below the poverty line, including no under eighteens and none of those over 64.
