= Cooper Landing Post Office =

- U.S. National Register of Historic Places
- U.S. Historic district – Contributing property
- Alaska Heritage Resources Survey
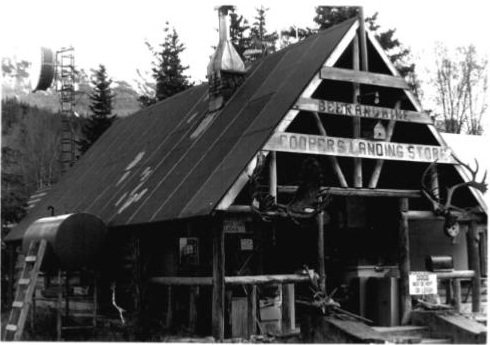
- Cooper Landing Post Office in 1977

- Location within Alaska
- Location: Sterling Highway, Cooper Landing, Alaska
- Coordinates: 60°29′20″N 149°50′5″W
- Area: less than one acre
- Built: 1921
- Built by: Jack Lean
- Part of: Cooper Landing Historic District (ID78003425)
- NRHP reference No.: 78003425
- AHRS No.: SEW-146

Significant dates
- Added to NRHP: May 23, 1978
- Designated CP: August 21, 1986
- Designated AHRS: October 15, 1976

The Cooper Landing Post Office, formerly known as Jack Lean's Store, is a historic building located in the town of Cooper Landing, Alaska. Cooper Landing was established after prospector Joseph Cooper discovered gold in the 1880s where the Kenai River meets Kenai Lake. The chalet-style building was built c. 1910-20 as a simple log cabin, and was enlarged in the 1920s and 1930s, probably not acquiring its distinctive facade until the 1930s. Its facade is adorned with hunting trophies such as caribou and moose antlers. The building has been relocated a short distance to the west, along with the historical Ridderford School, and is now part of the Cooper Landing Historical Museum.

The building was listed on the National Register of Historic Places in 1978.

== See also ==
- National Register of Historic Places listings in Kenai Peninsula Borough, Alaska
- List of United States post offices

== External References ==
Cooper Landing Museum
