= Susitna River Bridge =

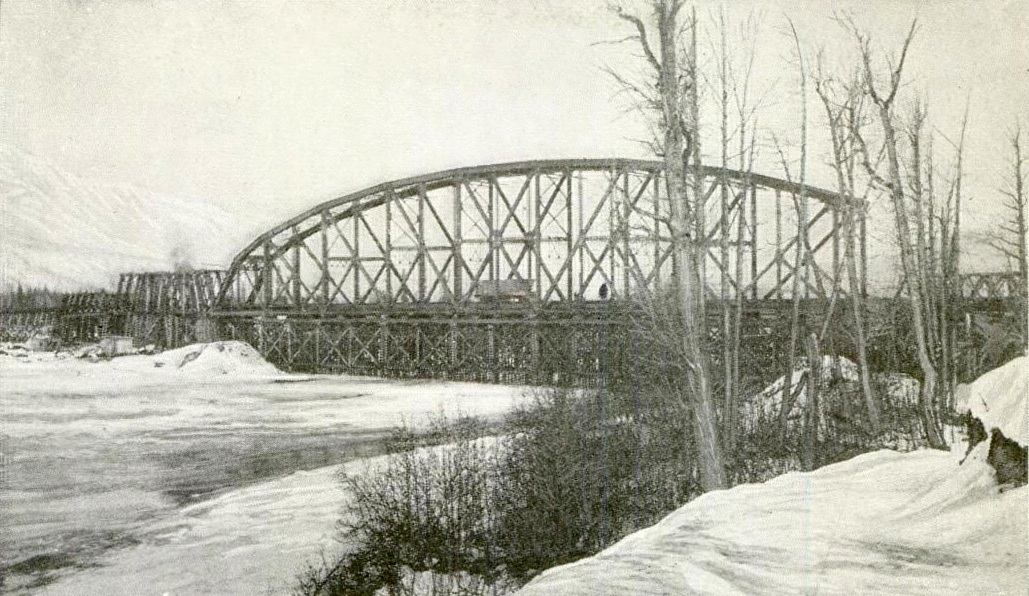
- Under construction, 1920 (view looking west, from upstream)
- Coordinates: 62°46′04″N 149°41′37″W
- Carries: Alaska Railroad
- Crosses: Sustina River
- Locale: south-central Alaska

Characteristics
- Design: Through truss
- Material: Steel
- Height: 71 feet (22 m)
- Longest span: 503 feet (153 m)

History
- Construction start: October 1920
- Construction end: February 1921
- Susitna River Bridge
- U.S. National Register of Historic Places
- Alaska Heritage Resources Survey
- Location within Alaska
- Location: Alaska Railroad Mile 264.1, North of Gold Creek, Matanuska-Susitna Borough, Alaska
- Coordinates: 62°46′05″N 149°41′35″W
- Area: less than one acre
- Built: 1921
- Architect: American Bridge Company
- Architectural style: Through truss
- NRHP reference No.: 77000227
- AHRS No.: TLM-006

Significant dates
- Added to NRHP: September 15, 1977
- Designated AHRS: April 8, 1975

Location
- Interactive map of Susitna River Bridge

The Susitna River Bridge, also known as the Gold Creek Bridge, was the longest bridge span on the United States Government Railway in Alaska. The steel 504-foot (154 m) through-truss channel spans the Susitna River. It was completed in February, 1921. The crossing of the Susitna includes two 121-ft. combination Howe truss flanking spans and two 70-foot (21 m) combination pony Howe truss end spans, with 392 feet (119 m) of trestle at the southern approach and 28 feet (8.5 m). at the northern approach, making a total length of 1,322-foot (403 m). It is located 150 miles (240 km) north of Anchorage, and 264 miles (425 km) north of the terminus at Seward. The bridge was listed on the National Register of Historic Places in 1977.

== Study and design ==
In a study of the river under summer and winter conditions as a preliminary to the design of the bridge, high-water marks and ice scars on trees indicated the elevation reached by the ice while in motion. The spring break-up occurs usually before the ice has become soft, and in passing downstream massive pieces jam against the islands and bars and against the shore at points where the river takes a sharp turn, the water then rising until its pressure breaks the dams. It appeared evident that such rushes of accumulated water and ice would carry out any timber pier and that a concrete pier would be exposed not only to the tremendous pressure of the ice jam but also to undermining by the scour that would result from the creation of an ice dam against the pier. A comparative estimate for the structure over the main channel to consist of two 250-foot (76 m) steel spans on three concrete piers (with one pier near the center of the channel) or a single 504-foot (154 m) steel span on two concrete shore piers, slightly favored the long span, which therefore was adopted.

The combination of steel trusses and timber trusses in the same bridge is considered to be justified by the high price of bridge steel and concrete work at the time of construction, it being cheaper to build all approach spans of timber and to make provision for possible renewal with steel and concrete when the life of the timber has reached its limit. For this reason the main piers were designed to support 200-foot (61 m) steel flanking spans at some future time, each to replace the present 121-foot (37 m) and 70-foot (21 m) spans.

The Cooper E60 loading was adopted for the 504-foot (154 m) span, E50 for the timber and E44 for the trestling, which has 14-foot (4.3 m) spans. In the design of the steel span the 1910 specifications of the American Railway Engineering Association were followed mainly. Wind loading was an exception to this; the bottom lateral system was designed for 40 pounds per square foot (200 kg/m^{2}) on the area of train and floor in elevation, and on li times the area of truss members of one truss not covered by train and floor, while the top laterals were designed for 500 pounds per foot (740 kg/m) of span.

== Pier foundations and construction ==
Test holes 60–70 feet (18–21 m) deep to determine the character of foundation for the concrete piers disclosed compact sand, gravel and large boulders in layers of varying thicknesses, suitable for carrying pier loading without foundation piles.

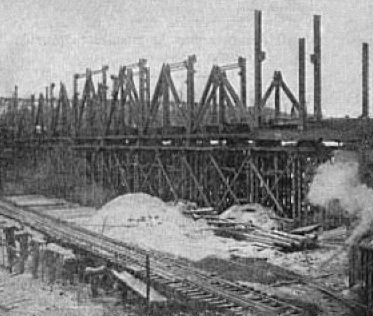
Erection of 504 foot span (November 29, 1920)

Pier construction started in May, 1920, when the head of track was 22 miles (35 km) south of the bridge site. Supplies were freighted by sleds on the ice until the river broke and then by boats and wagons. Transportation difficulties were practically overcome when the track reached the river in September, 1920. At that time excavation for the south pier was complete and that for the north pier had been begun. A temporary trestle 100 feet (30 m) downstream from the bridge site permitted track laying to proceed and facilitated erection of the bridge without interference to traffic and to other construction work north of the river. Piles for the trestle bents, piers and abutments had been driven and the falsework for the steel span had been started from the north end before the track reached the site.

An open caisson was used for the north pier excavation, and a cofferdam of Wakefield triple-lap sheet piling for the south pier. Excavation was started in the wet with orangepeel buckets operated by two stiff-leg derricks until hard material was struck; then the holes were pumped out and work was continued by laborers.

== Concrete work ==
Considerable difficulty was encountered in finding sand and gravel suitable for the concrete piers. Aggregate taken from pits in the vicinity of the bridge was not satisfactory, as samples showed humus. Several deposits along the railway line all showed the presence of this constituent in various amounts, except samples from a pit in a glacial moraine in front of Spencer Glacier, 56 miles north of Seward. This deposit tested clear and was used; 7 per cent of sand was added to the bank aggregate, which was deficient in this respect.

After a partial failure in one of the piers during September, 1920, caused by poor cement, the presence of humus in the aggregate and the low temperature of the air and water, special measures were resorted to in placing concrete in main piers.

When the cofferdam was unwatered, the bottom of the enclosure was under a 22-foot (6.7 m) head of water from the river, and owing to the porous nature of the boulder and gravel formation considerable water was forced through the floor of the pit. The enclosure was 33-by-69-foot (10 m × 21 m) and it was found impracticable to partition it off and place and hold concrete in the dry against the flow of water. As the low temperature of the water (35 deg. F. in November) and the large area (2,277 square feet [211.5 m^{2}]) made it impracticable to place concrete under water by bucket or pipe methods, the following plan was devised to meet the conditions of cold running water and low air Fig. 4. temperature. A large sheet of canvas was prepared in one piece, sufficient to entirely cover the bottom area and extend about 6 feet (1.8 m) up the sides of the enclosure. This canvas was "formed-in" by wooden forms along the sides and ends, to provide a runway for water around the edges. Steam coils were placed around the sides of the pit enclosure and the entire spaced was housed in and made warm. Sand and gravel delivered on cars were heated by being dumped on a platform holding perforated steam pipe coils, and hot water was used in mixing.

Concrete was poured at the south pier, containing 1,456 cubic yards (1,113 m^{3}), from October 24 to November 11, 1920, during which time temperature readings ranged from —2 deg. to -j-48 deg. F. At the north pier, containing 1,520 cubic yards (1,160 m^{3}), the pouring was from December 1 to December 18, 1920, when temperatures ranged from —12 deg. to -(-34 deg. F. The pit was kept unwatered, and the concrete was placed from chutes and pipes leading from mixer to pier. All concrete was given sufficient time to set before allowing cold water to come in contact with it.

== Erection of steel channel span ==
To hasten erection of the 504-foot (154 m) span, it was necessary to proceed without waiting for completion of the piers. Falsework for this span, as mentioned, had been driven from the north end. The north approach trestle, piers and falsework for timber spans were driven and a temporary deck laid. One of the 70-foot (21 m) pony spans was used temporarily to span the excavation for the north pier, thus permitting the construction of this foundation.

Erection of steel started November 8, 1920, from the north end at panel point No. 2, a yard having been constructed on the north side of the river which was reached by means of the temporary trestle. Erection was continued to the south end and all steel except for the two north panels was assembled by December 15, 1920. Steel in these two panels which did not interfere with the 70-foot (21 m) pony span was placed after December 25. As soon as this temporary span was removed, the rest of the steel was placed, completing the erection on January 8, 1921.

A 100-ton locomotive crane with a boom having extensions to make a total length of 85 feet (26 m) was used for the erection, being supplemented in the yard by a 35-ton locomotive crane with 50-foot (15 m) boom. The total weight of steel in the span is 1,803 tons. Only a little riveting was done until after December 20, 1920, when over 90 per cent of the span was in place, but the work was then pushed until completion on February 9, 1921, during which time temperatures ranged from —42 to -(-34 deg. F. On some cold and windy days the riveters did not work; but on one occasion rivets were driven when it was —42 deg. in the morning and —12 deg. at quitting time. Rivets driven during very low temperatures were retested several times later in warmer weather and showed first class work. The total number of field rivets was about 42,200.

The span was swung February 2, 1921, and the first train passed over on February 6. The work of erecting the timber spans and finishing the trestle progressed simultaneously with the steel erection, so that the bridge was entirely completed and ready for service on February 16. General supervision of the work was under Col. F. Mears, chairman and chief engineer of the Alaskan Engineering Commission. The preliminary design of the 504-foot (154 m) steel span and the design and details of the timber spans and foundation work were made by W. J. H. Fogelstrom, former bridge engineer for the Commission, assisted by F. H. Chapin, assistant bridge engineer. Final design and details of the 504-foot (154 m) steel span were made by the American Bridge Co., which also fabricated and erected the steel. All designs and detail plans of steel work were checked and approved by Modjeski & Angier, consulting engineers, Chicago; Hildreth & Co., Chicago, performed the inspection of steel at mill and shop.

== See also ==
- National Register of Historic Places listings in Matanuska-Susitna Borough, Alaska
- List of bridges on the National Register of Historic Places in Alaska

== Bibliography ==
- McGraw-Hill (1921). Engineering News-record. 3. Vol. 83 (Public domain ed.). New York: McGraw-Hill.
