= Alaska Central Railroad Tunnel No. 1 =

Tunnel in the Kenai Peninsula, Alaska

- Alaska Central Railroad: Tunnel No. 1
- U.S. National Register of Historic Places
- Alaska Heritage Resources Survey
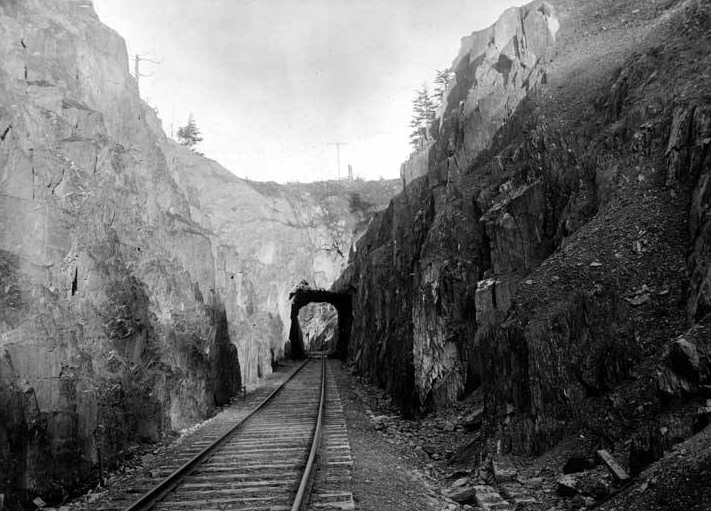
- Tunnel in 1918

- Location within Alaska
- Location: Placer River Valley, west of Bartlett Glacier
- Nearest city: Seward, Alaska
- Coordinates: 60°39′14″N 149°3′28″W
- Area: less than one acre
- Built: 1906
- Architects: Frank Bartlett; Alaska Central Railroad
- NRHP reference No.: 77001576
- AHRS No.: SEW-139

Significant dates
- Added to NRHP: November 28, 1977
- Designated AHRS: August 14, 1975

Alaska Central Railroad Tunnel No. 1, also known as the Loop District Tunnel No. 1 is a historic railroad tunnel located about 40 miles (64 km) north of Seward, Alaska, in the Placer River Valley, Kenai Peninsula. The tunnel was dug in 1906 and served the Alaska Central Railroad and later the Alaska Railroad until the route in the area, known as the "Loop District" was rerouted in 1951.

== History ==
In 1903, the Alaska Central Railroad began a rail project north from Seward. The company encountered the most significant geographic obstacles to construction between 47 and 53 miles (85 km) north of Seward, a section known as the "Loop District", where the line would need to cross a high-point in the Kenai Mountains and avoid the paths of two glaciers. A survey line was completed in between 10 and 15 feet (4.6 m) of snow during the 1904–05 winter. Between March and November 1905, engineer Frank Bartlett determined sites for the structures needed to complete the route. At Mile 48.2 the route traveled through the tunnel.

The tunnel was part of a section of the route that turned 235 degrees. The tunnel curved at 14 degrees per hundred feet and approximately 100 degrees of the turn was completed within the tunnel. Upon exiting the tunnel, the route crossed a 1,600 feet (490 m) trestle that was between 40 and 90 feet (27 m) high and completed the remaining 135 degrees of the curve.

Construction began on January 16, 1906. The first 250 feet (76 m) was dug using a steam-powered drill. Despite good progress made with the steam drill, the heat from the steam caused the tunnel to become too hot, and pneumatic power was used beginning April 28. Drilling was completed on September 25 on the tunnel finished on October 8. The total cost of labor and materials was US$96,782.66.

In 1914, a survey crew for the Alaska Engineering Commission studied the area for a proposed government railroad and to assess the Alaska Central line. The Commission recommended that the Alaska Central line be purchased by the Federal Government, and it was incorporated into the Alaska Railroad. The Alaska Engineering Commission extended the line north to Fairbanks.

The Loop District and Tunnel #1 were difficult and expensive to maintain, especially during the winter season. During the winter, a crew of men were stationed at the tunnel to operate a steam heating plant and large doors that had been installed at either end of the tunnel to keep the tracks inside from freezing. With rising costs associated with keeping the tunnel operable and the task of replacing many declining trestles, the railroad undertook a $1 million project in 1951 to relocate the route around Loop District between Miles 47.5 and 50.8 north of Seward. The retreat of Bartlett Glacier made a new route possible. The completion of the new route and dedication on November 6, 1951, made the Loop District route obsolete.

The tunnel was added to the National Register of Historic Places on November 28, 1977, and is in the possession of the Chugach National Forest.

== See also ==
- National Register of Historic Places listings in Kenai Peninsula Borough, Alaska
- List of bridges on the National Register of Historic Places in Alaska
