= Holy Assumption of the Virgin Mary Church =

- Holy Assumption Orthodox Church
- U.S. National Register of Historic Places
- U.S. National Historic Landmark
- Alaska Heritage Resources Survey
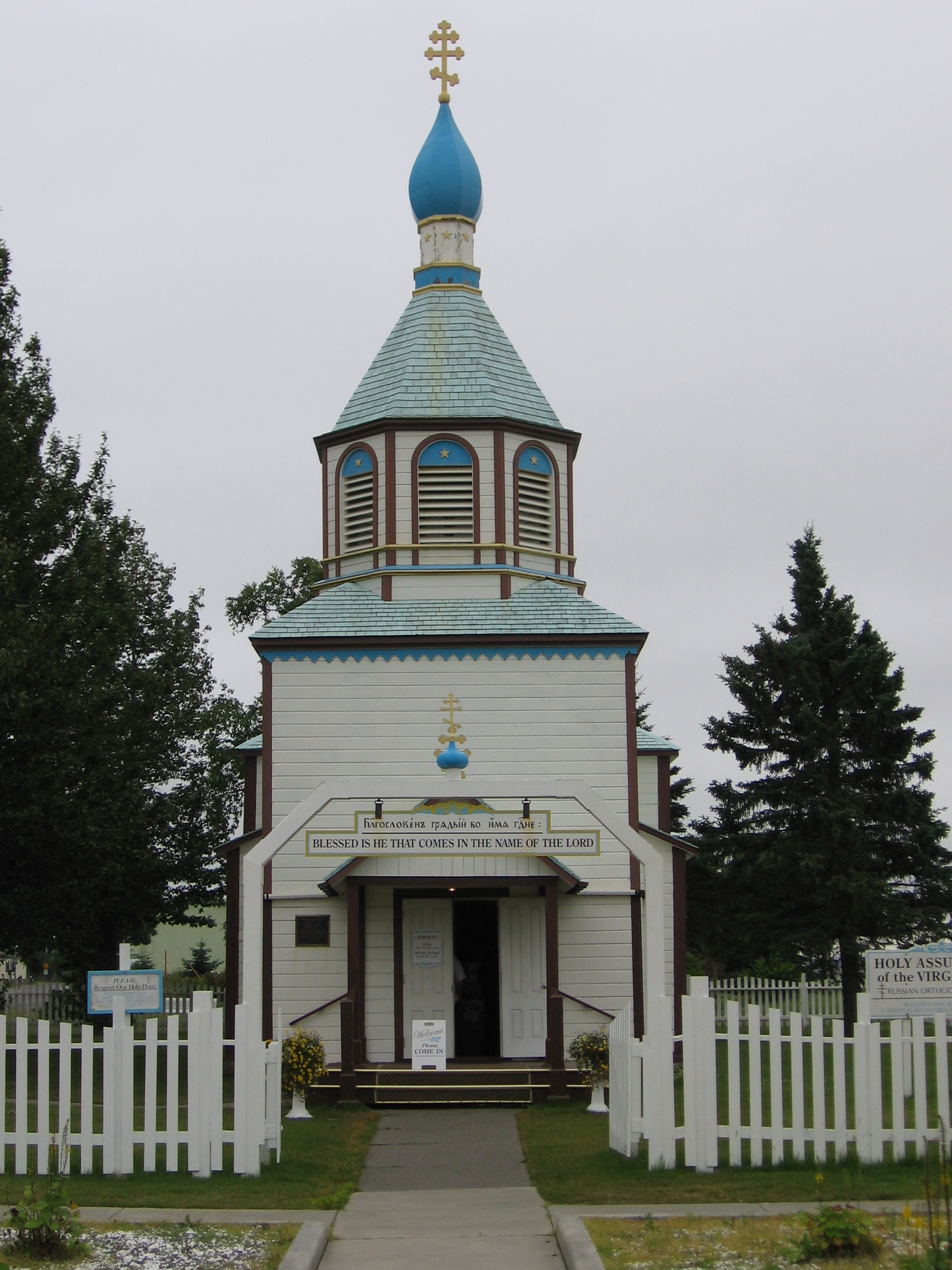

- Location within Alaska
- Location: Mission and Overland Streets, Kenai, Alaska
- Coordinates: 60°33′11″N 151°16′3″W
- Area: 13.47 acres (5.45 ha)
- Built: 1894
- MPS: Russian Orthodox Church Buildings and Sites TR (AD)
- NRHP reference No.: 70000898
- AHRS No.: KEN-036

Significant dates
- Added to NRHP: May 10, 1970
- Designated NHL: April 15, 1970
- Designated AHRS: June 16, 1972

Holy Assumption Orthodox Church (Russian: Свято-Успенская церковь), also known as Church of the Assumption of the Virgin Mary, is a Russian Orthodox parish church in Kenai, Alaska, United States. Completed in 1896, it is the oldest-standing Russian Orthodox church in Alaska and was a major center for the assimilation of the local Native population. It was declared a National Historic Landmark in 1970 and was added to the National Register of Historic Places shortly after.

Today the church is a member of the Orthodox Church in America Diocese of Alaska and further the Kenai Deanery.

== History ==
Alaska became a diocese in the Russian Orthodox Church in 1840, and the Church's popularity in the Kenai Peninsula region grew, particularly among the Kenaitze, the native people of the peninsula. Bishop Innocent created six parishes in Alaska, including one for the Kenai region. The first chapel was built that same year by the Russian-American Company near the village of Kenai within Fort St. Nicholas. The first priest to serve the parish, Igumen Nikolai Militov, arrived in 1844 and served until his death in 1869.

Igumen Nikolai oversaw the construction of a church in 1849 on a different portion of the lot. He opened a school in the early 1860s, and Russian became the principal language in both education and commerce. The church served as a vital method of assimilating the natives to the Russian culture. In addition to religious and educational purposes, the church served as an administrative and judicial center for the region.

Built from 1895 to 1896, the church was the second Orthodox church at the site, replacing the 1849 structure. The church was built from logs in the Pskov style, that is in the shape of a ship. The bell tower was completed later in 1900. The interior contains an elaborate iconostasis.

The Chapel of St. Nicholas was built in 1906. It rests over the graves of Igumen Nikolai, his assistant and reader Makari Ivanov, and an unrecorded monk. The chapel sits on the site of the original chapel, across the street from the church, on a bluff overlooking the confluence of the Kenai River and Cook Inlet. The rectory was built in 1881 and is considered the oldest building in the Peninsula.

The church site, including the rectory, cemetery, and chapel, was declared a National Historic Landmark in 1970.

== List of priests ==
Early on, the parish was served by priests who emigrated from Russia. From 1860, Nikolai Militov and Makary Ivanov, in whose honor the Chapel of St. Nicholas was built, traveled the region and vaccinated thousands of Dena'ina from smallpox. Militov died in 1867.

- 1838: Bishop Innocent Veniaminov ordered a resident priest for Kenai
- 1844-1867: Igumen Nikolai Militov (Abbot Nicholas)
- 1867-1877: Songleader Makary Ivanov
- 1881-1886: Hieromonk Nikita
- 1886-1890: Nicholas Mitropolsky
- 1891-1896: Father Alexander Yaroshevich
- 1896-1908: Father John Bortnovsky
- 1906-1952: Father Paul Shadura
- 1952-1969: Songleader Deacon Alexander Ivanoff served with no resident priest. Visiting priests would conduct Easter and other various services.
- 1969-1973: Archimandrite Cyril Bulashevich
- 1970-1972: Father Michael Oskolkoff and Simeon Oskolkoff served as visiting priests
- 1974-1991: Father Macarius Targonsky
- 1992-1993: Father Paul Merculief served as a visiting priest
- 1993-1997: Father Sergie Active
- 1998-2003: Father Michael Trefon
- 2003–2018: Father Thomas Andrew
- 2018-2020: Father Daniel Charles
- 2020–2025: Father Peter Tobias
- 2025-Present: Father Vasily Fisher

== See also ==
- List of National Historic Landmarks in Alaska
- National Register of Historic Places listings in Kenai Peninsula Borough, Alaska
