= Cooper Landing Historic District =

Historic district in Alaska, United States

- U.S. National Register of Historic Places
- U.S. Historic district
- Alaska Heritage Resources Survey
- Location within Alaska
- Location: Cooper Landing, Alaska, United States, at mile 48.7 of Sterling Highway
- Coordinates: 60°29′21″N 149°49′57″W
- Area: 4.25 acres (1.72 ha)
- NRHP reference No.: 86001475
- AHRS No.: SEW-338

Significant dates
- Added to NRHP: August 21, 1986
- Designated AHRS: 1976; 1979

Cooper Landing Historic District is a historic district in Cooper Landing, Alaska, that is listed on the National Register of Historic Places.

== Description ==
The district encompasses a cluster of five buildings. Oriented toward the Kenai River, but now accessible from the Sterling Highway, the district includes two residential structures (a house built out of recycled bridge timbers and a modest log cabin) built before 1910, the Cooper Landing Post Office, built in the 1910s, the c. 1925 log Riddiford School, and the c. 1946 Leo Douglas log cabin. They represent the historic heart of the Cooper Landing community, which stretches for 10 miles (16 km) along the highway, and were listed on the National Register of Historic Places August 21, 1986.

== Contributing properties ==
The historical district contains a total of five contributing properties, built between 1905 and 1946:

- The Charles & Beryl Lean House, 60°29′22″N 149°50′01″W, built c. 1910.
- The Ridderford School, 60°29′20″N 149°50′06″W, built c. 1925–1927. The building has been relocated a short distance to the west of its original location and is now part of the Cooper Landing Historical Society Museum.
- The Dunc Little Cabin, 60°29′22″N 149°50′04″W, built c. 1905.
- The Leo Douglas Cabin, 60°29′21″N 149°50′02″W, built c. 1946.
- The Cooper Landing Post Office (formerly Jack Lean's Store) 60°29′20″N 149°50′05″W, built c. 1910–1920. The building has been relocated along with Ridderford School a short distance to the west and is now part of the Cooper Landing Historical Society Museum. It is also individually listed on the National Register of Historic Places.

== See also ==
- National Register of Historic Places listings in Kenai Peninsula Borough, Alaska

== External References ==
- Cooper Landing Historical Society Museum
