= Chugachik Island =

Archaeological site in Alaska, United States

Chugachik
- Location within Alaska

Geography
- Location: Kachemak Bay
- Coordinates: 59°44′43″N 151°2′46″W
- Highest elevation: 43 ft (13.1 m)

Administration
- United States
- State: Alaska
- Borough: Kenai Peninsula Borough

Additional information
- Chugachik Island Site
- U.S. National Register of Historic Places
- Alaska Heritage Resources Survey
- Location: Address restricted
- Nearest city: Homer, Alaska
- NRHP reference No.: 76002279
- AHRS No.: SEL-033
- Added to NRHP: August 19, 1976

Chugachik Island is a small island in the upper reaches of Kachemak Bay, an indent in the Kenai Peninsula of south-central Alaska. The island falls within the bounds of Kachemak Bay State Park.

The island is of archaeological interest, with at least two sites (identified as SEL-033 and SEL-079) that have been professionally excavated. SEL-033 is a predominantly a midden, in which remains of flora and fauna have been recovered among human artifacts, including stone and bone tools, and a cradle made of birch bark. The site was excavated in 1974 and 1977, with radiocarbon dating suggesting occupation around 360 BCE. SEL-079, excavated in 1982, included three layers of occupation, dating from the early 1st century BCE to a Tanaina occupation estimated to date to the late 19th century. The latter find represents the first known evidence of Tanaina occupation of the area. A parcel of 1.2 acres (0.49 ha) surrounding SEL-033 was listed on the National Register of Historic Places in 1976.

== See also ==
- List of islands of Alaska
- National Register of Historic Places listings in Kenai Peninsula Borough, Alaska
