= Swetman House =

Historic house in Alaska, United States

- Swetmann House
- U.S. National Register of Historic Places
- Alaska Heritage Resources Survey
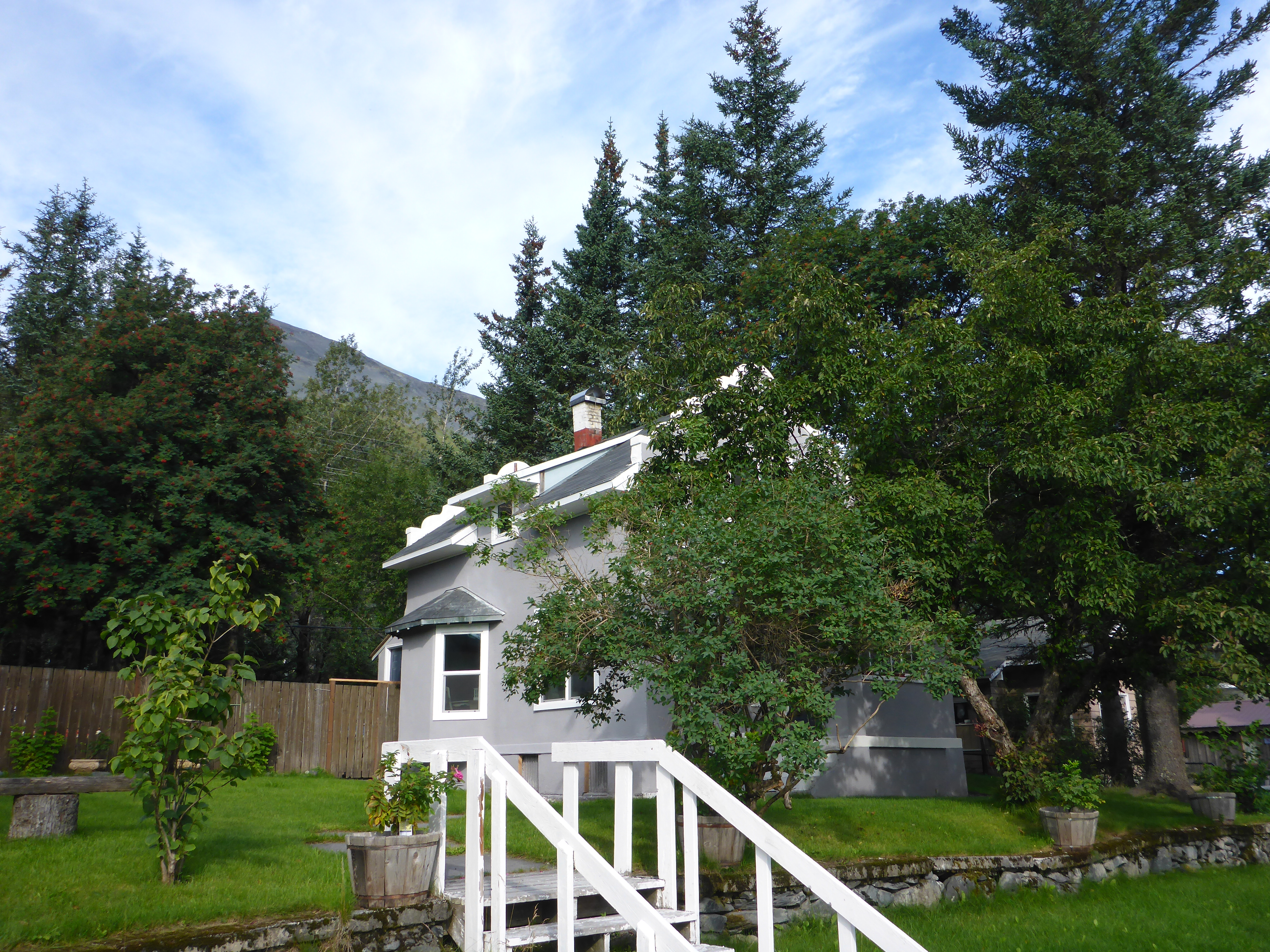

- Location within Alaska
- Location: 325 5th Avenue, Seward, Alaska
- Coordinates: 60°6′15″N 149°26′21″W
- Area: less than one acre
- Built: 1916
- Built by: Gerhard Johnson
- NRHP reference No.: 78003430
- AHRS No.: SEW-150

Significant dates
- Added to NRHP: February 17, 1978
- Designated AHRS: June 28, 1977

Swetman House, also known as Swetmann House and Gerhard "Stucco" Johnson House, is a historic residence at 325 5th Avenue in Seward, Alaska. The house was constructed in 1916 and was originally located adjacent to Seward's Mount Marathon. In 1920 or 1921, the original owner, Gerhard "Stucco" Johnson, sold the house to pharmacist Elwyn Swetman on condition that Swetman move the property to his own lot. The property was added to the National Register of Historic Places on February 17, 1978.

== History ==
Gerhard Johnson, was an artist, craftsman, and housebuilder in Seward. His heavy use of stucco earned him the nickname "Stucco Johnson". He was involved in the founding of two of Alaska's earliest prominent banks, the National Bank of Alaska and the First National Bank of Anchorage. He came to Seward in the early-20th century from New York City, where he was an established businessman. Many of his design jobs in Seward and Anchorage featured his trademark use of stucco to cover wood siding. In 1916 he constructed his own house north of the town on a dairy farm.

In 1920 Johnson sold the house to town pharmacist Elwyn Swetman, and the house was moved to Swetman's property. Elwyn Swetman died in 1951. Following the death of his wife Viola in 1976, the property was passed by will to the Seward Public Library. In 1979 the Library sold the house to a private party.

== Description ==
The dimensions of the house measure 17.5 feet (5.3 m) by 25 feet (7.6 m). In its current location, Swetman House sits on a full concrete basement, a sign of affluency in the time and place because of its cost. It has two floors, plus an attic and has been called the "architectural gem of Seward".

== See also ==
- National Register of Historic Places listings in Kenai Peninsula Borough, Alaska
