= Harry A. Johnson Trapline Cabin =

Historic house in Alaska, United States

- U.S. National Register of Historic Places
- Alaska Heritage Resources Survey
- Location within Alaska
- Nearest city: Hope, Alaska
- Coordinates: 60°45′21″N 149°56′46″W
- Area: less than one acre
- Built: 1926
- Built by: Harry A. Johnson
- NRHP reference No.: 00000424
- AHRS No.: SEW-00948
- Added to NRHP: May 5, 2000

The Harry A. Johnson Trapline Cabin is a log cabin in a remote location on the Kenai Peninsula of south-central Alaska. It is located on the banks of an unnamed creek in Kenai National Wildlife Refuge about 15 miles (24 km) southwest of Hope. It is about 14 by 11 feet (4.3 m × 3.4 m), with a steeply pitched roof 11 feet 6 inches (3.51 m) in height. The cabin was built in 1926 by Harry A. Johnson, a semi-recluse who came to Alaska in 1904 to work on the railroads, and lived a life of subsistence and occasional work. Johnson built the cabin in part as a place where he could engage in nature photography, particularly of wildlife.

The cabin was listed on the National Register of Historic Places in 2000.

== See also ==
- National Register of Historic Places listings in Kenai Peninsula Borough, Alaska
