= Hirshey Mine =

Archaeological site in Alaska, United States

- U.S. National Register of Historic Places
- Alaska Heritage Resources Survey
- Location within Alaska
- Location: East wall of Palmer Creek valley, 12 miles (19 km) from Hope on Palmer Creek Road
- Nearest city: Hope, Alaska
- Coordinates: 60°47′33″N 149°31′54″W
- Area: less than one acre
- Built: 1911
- Built by: John Hirshey
- NRHP reference No.: 78003419
- AHRS No.: SEW-002

Significant dates
- Added to NRHP: September 13, 1978
- Designated AHRS: January 10, 1971

The Hirshey Mine was one of the major gold mines in the northern mountains of the Kenai Peninsula in south-central Alaska in the first half of the 20th century. The mine was, unlike many local claims, an underground operation. It is located in the mountains of what is now Chugach National Forest, on the east side of Palmer Creek about 12 miles (19 km) southeast of the community of Hope. The claim was staked in 1911 John Hirshey, who arrived in the area in 1895 and was one of the early settlers of Hope. He called the claim his "Lucky Strike", and it was worked until all mines were closed in the area in 1942. When the area was listed on the National Register of Historic Places in 1978, remnants of two buildings survived, along with the entrance to one of the tunnels and discarded equipment.

The mine was listed on the National Register of Historic Places in 1978.

== See also ==
- National Register of Historic Places listings in Kenai Peninsula Borough, Alaska
