= Moose River Site =

Archaeological site in Alaska, United States

- U.S. National Register of Historic Places
- Alaska Heritage Resources Survey
- Location: Address restricted
- Nearest city: Sterling, Alaska
- Area: 6.2 acres (2.5 ha)
- NRHP reference No.: 78003427
- AHRS No.: KEN-043
- Added to NRHP: December 20, 1978

The Moose River Site is a prehistoric archaeological site in Kenai Peninsula Borough, Alaska. Located near the confluence of the Kenai and Moose Rivers near Sterling, it is apparently a camp or village site that was used as a fishing camp about 1500 years ago. The site includes seven house pits and three food cache pits.

The site was listed on the National Register of Historic Places in 1978.

== See also ==
- National Register of Historic Places listings in Kenai Peninsula Borough, Alaska
