= Soldotna Post Office =

- U.S. National Register of Historic Places
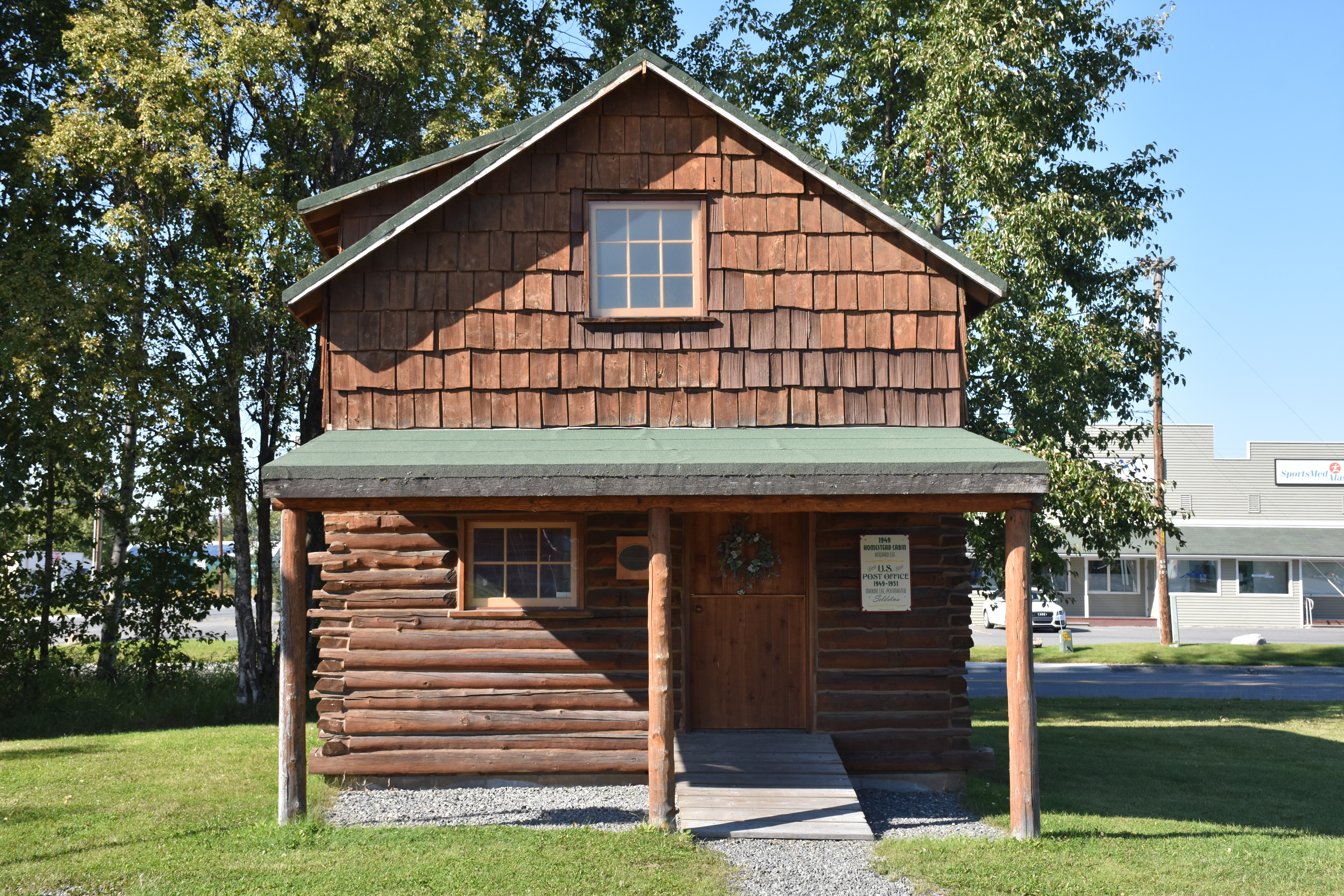

- Location within Alaska
- Location: East Corral Avenue and Kenai Spur Highway in Soldotna, Alaska
- Coordinates: 60°29′34″N 151°04′05″W
- Built: 1949
- Architectural style: Log cabin
- NRHP reference No.: 08000904
- Added to NRHP: September 17, 2008

The Soldotna Post Office is a former post office in Soldotna, Alaska, United States. The log cabin, which served as the first post office for the town of Soldotna, was listed on the National Register of Historic Places on September 17, 2008.

In 1947, Howard and Maxine Lee read about homesteading opportunities in Kenai Peninsula Borough, Alaska in The Saturday Evening Post that granted land to those willing to improve and inhabit it. Howard Lee was in the United States Navy and stationed in Florida, but headed north in March 1948. Maxine and their daughter, Karen, remained in Seattle, while Howard continued on to the Anchorage Land Office. Howard found that all the land along the Sterling Highway had been claimed, but learned of a couple who had moved the year before and would sell their land and a 60-foot by 30-foot Quonset hut to the Lees for $1,000. Maxine and Karen Lee joined Howard in June 1949.

== See also ==
- National Register of Historic Places listings in Kenai Peninsula Borough, Alaska
- List of United States post offices
