= Thorn-Stingley House =

Historic house in Alaska, United States

- U.S. National Register of Historic Places
- Alaska Heritage Resources Survey
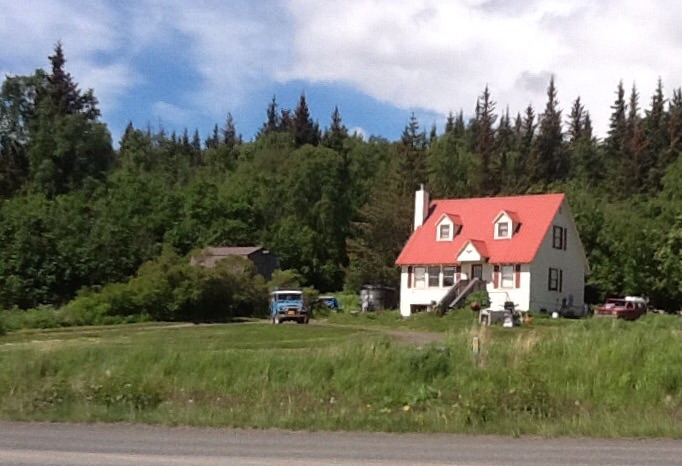

- Location within Alaska
- Location: 1660 East End Road, Homer, Alaska
- Coordinates: 59°39′23″N 151°30′2″W
- Area: less than one acre
- Built: 1945
- Built by: Francis H. Thorn
- Architectural style: Bungalow/craftsman
- NRHP reference No.: 01000023
- AHRS No.: SEL-00155
- Added to NRHP: February 2, 2001

The Thorn-Stingley House was a historic house in Homer, Alaska, listed on the National Register of Historic Places in 2001. Built in 1945, it was one of the city's few little-altered examples of housing built in Homer's boom years following World War II. It was built by Francis H. Thorn, a well-driller and was occupied by him and/or his family until 1973. The house was a 1 1/2-story wood-frame structure, roughly rectangular in shape, with a side-gable roof and a full basement that includes a one-car garage. It was a local interpretation of the Bungalow style, with a pair of gable-roof dormers projecting from the front roof, and a projecting gable-roofed hood above the main entrance. The front facade was divided into three asymmetrical bays, with a grouping of three sash windows in the left bay (over the garage entrance), the entry in the center, and a single sash window to the right.

== See also ==
- National Register of Historic Places listings in Kenai Peninsula Borough, Alaska
