= Fort McGilvray =

Military fortification in Alaska

Coordinates: 59°59′12″N 149°23′25″W

Fort McGilvray was a United States military fortification located on Caines Head, a cliff 650 feet above Resurrection Bay south of Seward, Alaska. The United States Army established a series of defensive positions along the coast of the bay during World War II to defend Seward against a possible Japanese invasion. The bay was a strategically important location, as it remained ice-free throughout the year, and Seward served as the southern terminus of the Alaska Railroad, an important route for transporting civilian and military supplies throughout the territory.

Defense of the bay prior to the war consisted of four mobile 155-mm guns. The earliest constructions at Caines Head and South Beach along the bay were started on July 31, 1941. With the U.S. entry in the war, permanent mounts for the guns were constructed at Rocky Point, south of the site of Fort McGilvray. Plans were approved for three new batteries, two 6-inch batteries, one 90-mm gun, and numerous fire control and searchlight positions. Construction was hindered by the difficult terrain and winter season. By the end of 1943, the battery at Lowell Point just south of Seward was completed and manned by troops. Located near the fort at South Beach were utility buildings and barracks to house the 500 soldiers that supported the area's defences.

In March 1943, the installations atop Caines Head were named McGilvray after an Army officer who commanded Fort Kenay to the north in 1869. After American and Canadian forces reclaimed Attu and Kiska islands in the Aleutian Islands Campaign between May and August 1943, the Alaskan Department ordered the installations dismantled in March 1944. Many of the constructions were not yet fully completed. The guns were disassembled and shipped to locations in South Dakota and San Diego and the buildings were abandoned.

In 1971, the Alaska Division of Parks was established to control recreational land. The Caines Head State Recreation Area was established with 1800 acres. In 1974 it was expanded by an additional 4000 acres. The first work in clearing the abandoned military roads began in 1984. When workers reached the fort's site at the top of Caines Head they discovered the concrete buildings well-intact, with functioning doors and windows. Military and engineering experts consider it one of the most well-preserved sites in Alaska. The site was listed on the National Register of Historic Places in 2022.
