= Lowell Creek Diversion Tunnel =

- U.S. National Register of Historic Places
- Alaska Heritage Resources Survey
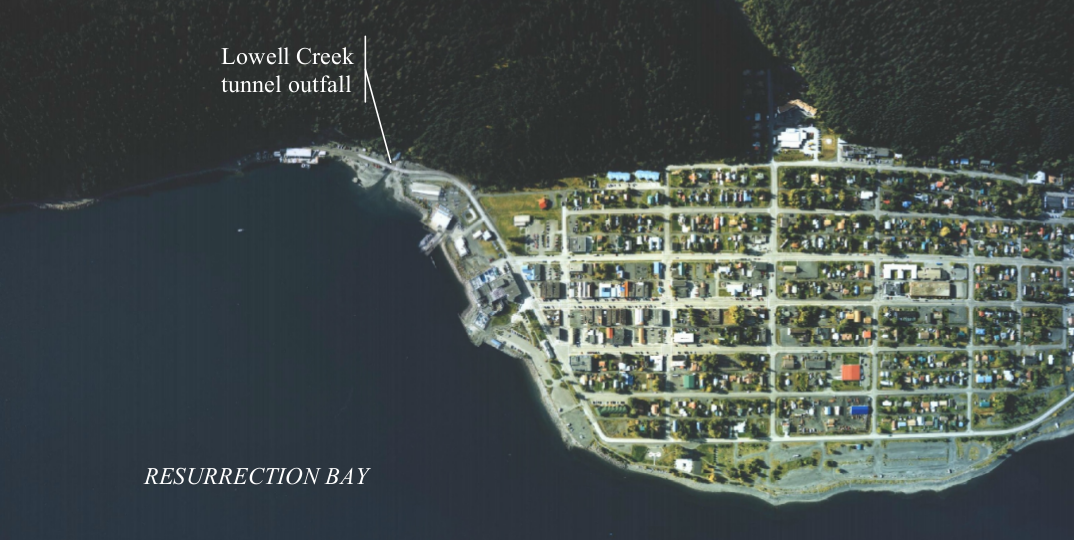
- Army Corps of Engineers photo of Seward showing tunnel outlet

- Location within Alaska
- Location: Lowell Canyon Road & Lowell Point Road, Seward, Alaska
- Coordinates: 60°6′11″N 149°27′9″W
- Built: 1940
- Built by: US Corps of Engineers
- NRHP reference No.: 77001577
- AHRS No.: SEW-011

Significant dates
- Added to NRHP: November 23, 1977
- Designated AHRS: May 30, 1973

The Lowell Creek Diversion Tunnel is a flood control project located in Seward, Alaska, United States. The project was constructed to alleviate flooding of Lowell Creek in Seward. It was the first flood control project completed by the United States Army Corps of Engineers in Alaska.

Originally, Lowell Creek ran through Seward along what is now Jefferson Street. Beginning with the town's establishment in 1903, the fast-moving stream produced one to three severe floods each year until the tunnel was built in 1939. The floods carried large amounts of debris from the mountains; one flood deposited 10,000 cubic yards in an 11-hour period in 1935.

In 1927 the Alaska Railroad constructed a small diversion dam and flume to carry debris down Jefferson Street to drain into Resurrection Bay. However, by 1937 these structures had deteriorated beyond repair. Consequently, the Army Corps of Engineers began construction of the new project in August 1939. The project consisted of:

1. a diversion dam, 400 feet (120 m) in length and up to 25 feet (7.6 m) high that diverted the creek away from its original path;
2. a tunnel through Bear Mountain, 2,068 feet (630 m) in length and 10 feet (3.0 m) in width;
3. an outlet flume, 109 feet (33 m) in length and 10 feet (3.0 m) in width which drains into Resurrection Bay.

Completed in 1940, this system withstood the 1964 Alaska earthquake, as well as severe floods in 1966, 1986, and 1995, which brought the water level within inches of cresting the dam.

The tunnel was listed on the National Register of Historic Places in 1977.

Though the project has prevented significant flooding in the city of Seward, debris continues to accumulate at the outlet of the flume and the city must work to move the debris further into the bay. With the significant risk of debris accumulation during a flooding event, new projects are being considered to replace the diversion tunnel — including the construction of a new, wider tunnel through Bear Mountain at a cost of $30 million, or an aqueduct underneath Jefferson Street.

== See also ==
- National Register of Historic Places listings in Kenai Peninsula Borough, Alaska
