= Brown & Hawkins Store =

- U.S. National Register of Historic Places
- Alaska Heritage Resources Survey
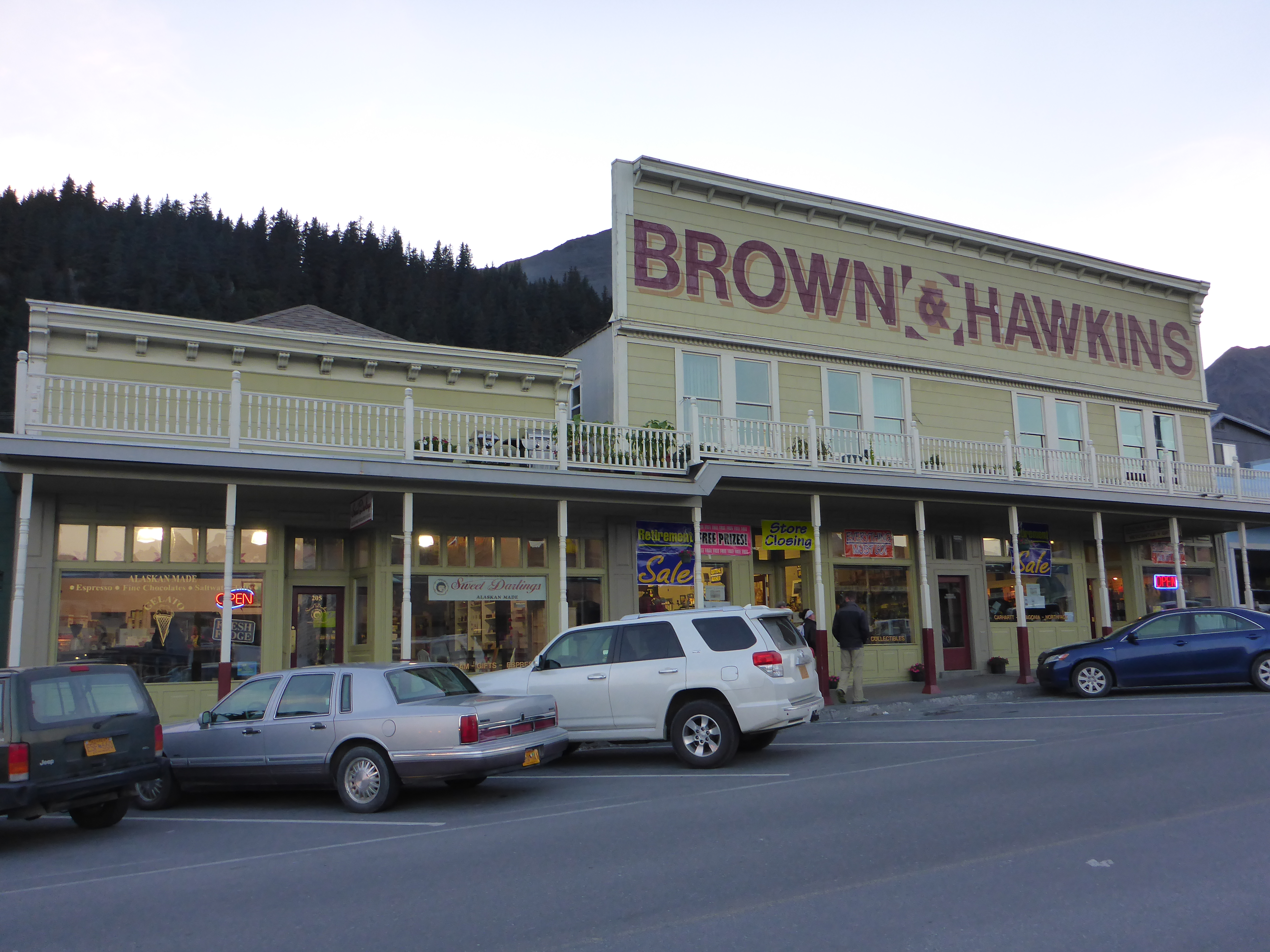

- Location within Alaska
- Location: 205, 207 and 209 4th Avenue, Seward, Alaska
- Coordinates: 60°6′5″N 149°26′27″W
- Area: less than one acre
- Built: 1904
- NRHP reference No.: 88000710
- AHRS No.: SEW-038
- Added to NRHP: June 23, 1988

Brown & Hawkins is a general store in Seward, Alaska. It was founded in 1904 to serve the town and those constructing of the Alaska Central Railroad, and has been the oldest continuously operating business in Seward. It was listed on the National Register of Historic Places in 1988. It was announced in 2013 that the owners were retiring without finding anyone to buy their business.

Brown & Hawkins was a business venture between partners Charles E. Brown of Montreal, Quebec, Canada, and T.W. Hawkins of Roanoke, Virginia. The two men met in Nome during the Gold Rush. They first started business together in Valdez in 1900 before moving to Seward in 1903. Their business in Seward included a store and bank.

The store building began as a one-story 12 by 24 feet (3.7 m × 7.3 m) frontier store with a low false front in 1903. It evolved through four periods of construction to add and modify additional structures.

As of 2009, Brown & Hawkins was still owned by the Hawkins family, making it the oldest store in Alaska under the same ownership. The original Mosler safe and brass cash register were displayed in the store.

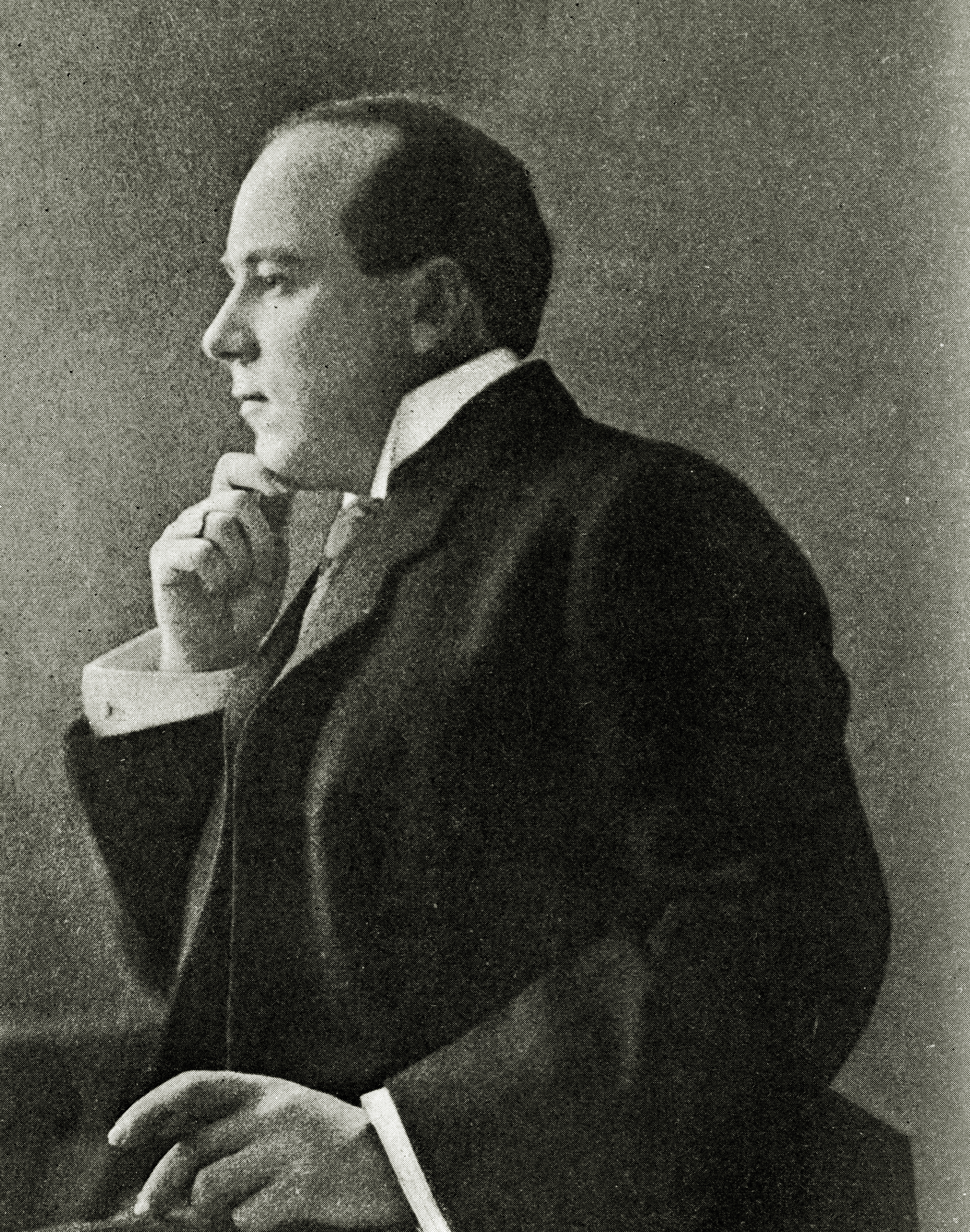
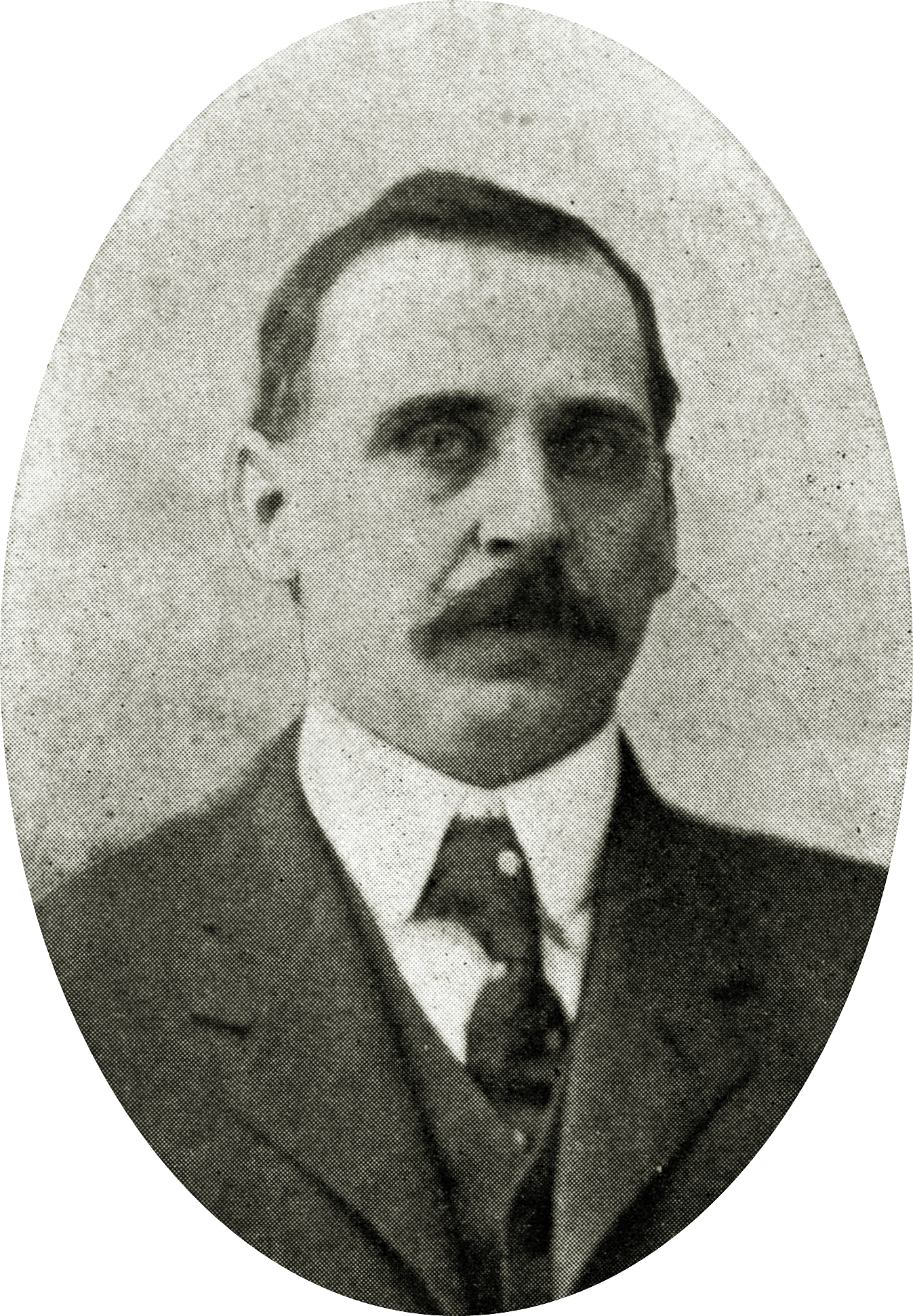
Brown (left) and Hawkins (right), 1911.

== See also ==
- National Register of Historic Places listings in Kenai Peninsula Borough, Alaska
