= Magnetic Island (Alaska) =

Island in Alaska

- Location within Alaska

Geography
- Location: Tuxedni Bay, Cook Inlet
- Coordinates: 60°14′36″N 152°50′51″W
- Highest elevation: 152 m (499 ft)

Administration
- United States
- State: Alaska
- Borough: Kenai Peninsula Borough
- Magnetic Island Site
- U.S. National Register of Historic Places
- Location: Address restricted
- NRHP reference No.: 15000071
- Added to NRHP: March 17, 2015

Magnetic Island is a small island on the north side of Tuxedni Bay, an inlet on the lower west side of Cook Inlet in south-central Alaska. The island is surrounded by mudflats that are under water during high tides. The island got its name from the presence of magnetism (believed due to magnetite) identified during a geological survey in 1951. Its shape and geology are heavily influenced by Mount Redoubt and Mount Iliamna, two active volcanoes located less than 20 miles (32 km) away.

The island has archaeological significance, which includes a prehistoric human habitation site which has been dated to c. 1800–1400 BCE. The site consists of a series of depressions that were excavated in 2012, yielding several layers of cultural materials, including fire-cracked stones and hearths, and stone tools stylistically associated with the Arctic Small Tool tradition. The site was presumed to be abandoned due to volcanic activity.

The archaeological site was listed on the National Register of Historic Places in 2015.

== See also ==
- List of islands of Alaska
- National Register of Historic Places listings in Kenai Peninsula Borough, Alaska
