= Caines Head State Recreation Area =

Recreational area in Alaska, US

- Location within Alaska
- Location: Kenai Peninsula Borough, Alaska
- Nearest city: Seward, Alaska
- Coordinates: 60°0′3.6″N 149°25′19.2″W
- Area: 6,571 acres (26.59 km^{2})
- Created: May, 1971
- Website: dnr.alaska.gov

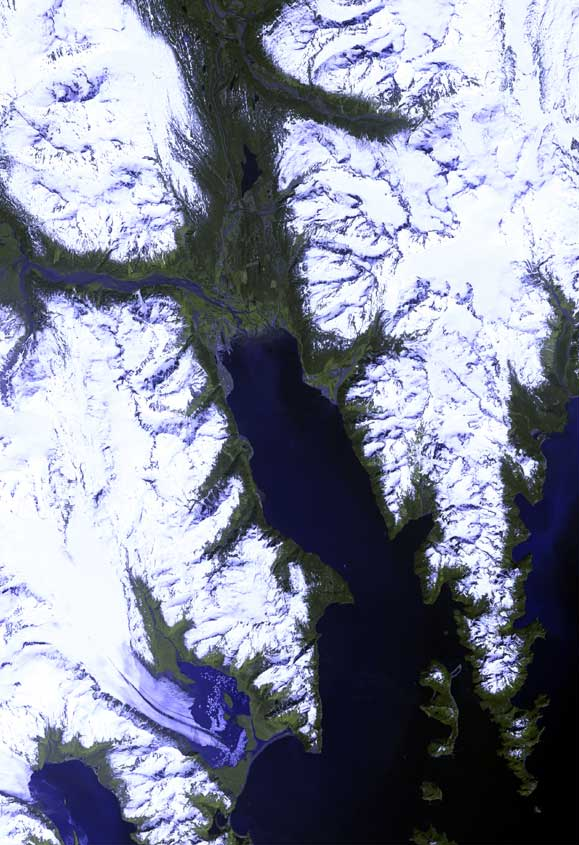
Satellite view of Resurrection Bay.

Caines Head State Recreation Area is a 6,571-acre (26.59 km^{2}) recreational area encompassing the Caines Head cape in Resurrection Bay, Alaska. The area is located in the Kenai Peninsula Borough, 7 miles (11 km) south of the city of Seward. A popular tourist destination, Caines Head features spruce and hemlock forests as well as a variety of terrestrial and marine wildlife (including harbor seals, Steller sea lions, sea otters, orcas, humpback, grey and fin whales, brown and black bears, lynx, mountain goats, wolves, etc.). It also features the remains of Fort McGilvray, a World War II-era fortification erected in 1941–1942 to defend against the potential invasion of the Imperial Japanese Army.

== History ==
There is no evidence that the area was previously settled by a Native American population. On August 28, 1903, the wooden steamship Santa Ana, operated by Pacific Clipper Steamship Company, brought the first permanent settlers to Seward, Alaska. The cape was named after Captain E.E. Caine, who was a pioneer of commercial marine transportation between the contiguous United States and Alaska and one of the company owners.

During World War II, the strategic importance of Caines Head was recognized early. The cape protrudes deep into Resurrection Bay, compelling vessels entering the bay to navigate around Caines Head before to reaching the port of Seward. The cape features a steep elevation of 1,500 feet (460 m), an extremely rugged shoreline, and a 20-foot (6.1 m) difference between high and low tides, effectively obstructing a marine landing.

Seward's port was considered critical to wartime logistics, as it was an ice-free port at the south terminus of Alaska Railroad. In July 1941, the US Army deployed 277 men and four 155-mm guns on Caines Head. In July 1942, several months after the Pearl Harbor Attack and a month after the Imperial Japanese Army's invasion of the Aleutian Islands, the US Army increased its presence and began constructing permanent fortifications on Caines Head.

Over 5 miles (8.0 km) of roads were built for military purposes; however, they were never connected with Seward. Instead, docking facilities were constructed at the north end of the road network. Permanent 6-inch (15 cm) artillery batteries were constructed on Caines Head, and a radar installation and submarine loop station were maintained in Resurrection Bay for their support. The installations on Caines Head were christened Fort McGilvray on March 25, 1943.

The defense project was almost completed by February 1944, but successful US Army and Navy advances in the Pacific Theater of World War II rendered the project irrelevant, and the battery was abandoned on April 7, 1944. Later, the battery was dismantled on March 4, 1947.

In 1971, Caines Head area was designated as Caines Head State Recreation Area. The intent was to develop outdoor recreation opportunities and conserve the remains of Fort McGilvray. By 1974, the area was enlarged to 5,961 acres (2,412 ha), in 1995, an additional 610 acres (250 ha) were added, thus reaching the present area of 6,771 acres (2,740 ha). The increase in tourism began in 1984; the first park rangers were appointed to the area in 1985.

== Tourism ==
The area can be reached on foot or by boat. Caines Head features a network of nature trails, some of which follow the original military roads. The remains of Fort McGilvray include reconstructed log structures erected in the summer of 1941, remains of the military docks, and the original battery installations. The area offers hiking and fishing opportunities, although the hikers following the trails along the beach are warned to time their activities with regards to the tides.

== See also ==
- List of Alaska state parks
- Seward, Alaska

== Literature cited ==
- DeVaughn, Melissa (2011), Alaska Adventure Guide, Birmingham: Menasha Ridge Press, ISBN 978-0897329064, LCCN 2010041094, OCLC 641521816
- Miller, David William (2004), Exploring Alaska's Kenai Fjords: a marine guide to the Kenai Peninsula outer coast, Birmingham: Wilderness Press, ISBN 0961395419, OCLC 62103056
- Sinclair, Jack (December 1, 1997), "Caines Head State Recreational Area Management Plan" (PDF), Division of Parks and Outdoor Recreation, Anchorage: Alaska Department of Natural Resources, archived from the original (PDF) on March 30, 2017
- Sinclair, Jack E. (2008), "Turning the Forgotten into the Remembered: The Making of Caines Head State Recreation Area", in Chandonnet, Fern (ed.), Alaska at War, 1941-1945: The Forgotten War Remembered, University of Alaska Press: University of Alaska Press, pp. 377–381, ISBN 978-1602230132, LCCN 2007014821, OCLC 123029673
- Snowden, Clinton A. (1909), Hanford, Cornelius; Moore, Miles Conway; Tyler, William D.; Chadwick, Stephen J. (eds.), History of Washington: The Rise and Progress of an American State, New York: The Century History Company, LCCN 09028416, OCLC 2827985
- Terpening, Traveler T. (2010), The Bradt travel guide: Alaska, Bradt Travel Guides (1 ed.), Chalfont St Peter: Bradt Travel Guides, ISBN 978-1841622989, LCCN 2010205930, OCLC 643074315
