= Government Cable Office =

- U.S. National Register of Historic Places
- Alaska Heritage Resources Survey
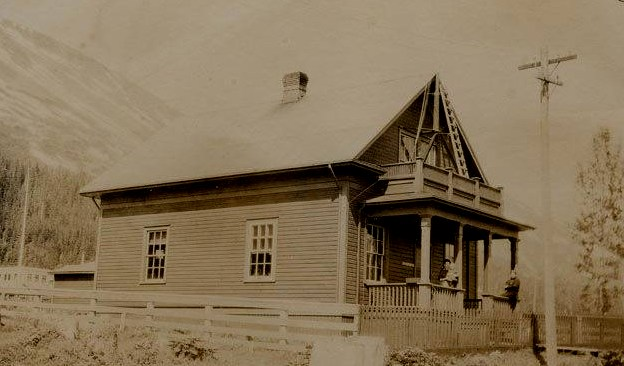

- Location within Alaska
- Location: 218 6th Avenue, Seward, Alaska
- Coordinates: 60°6′7″N 149°26′15″W
- Area: less than one acre
- Built: 1905
- Built by: US Army Signal Corps
- NRHP reference No.: 80004574
- AHRS No.: SEW-200

Significant dates
- Added to NRHP: January 4, 1980
- Designated AHRS: April 10, 1978

The Government Cable Office in Seward, Alaska, United States, is a historic building that served as a telegraph office connecting Seward with the rest of the United States.

The cable office was constructed in 1905 by the U.S. Army Signal Corps as part of the Washington–Alaska Military Cable and Telegraph System (WAMCATS). Telegraph service from the lower states first connected to Valdez, Alaska. In summer 1905, submarine cable was extended from Valdez to Seward.

The first message over the line was to A. C. Frost, president of the Alaska Central Railway, who was in Chicago: "This first message transmitted over Alaska Cable connects Seward from this day to the great city of Chicago." Among initial regular users of the telegraph line was the local newspaper, the Seward Daily Gateway. In August 1905, owner Frank Ballaine began featuring the previous day's news from the Coterminous United States in his paper. Before the telegraph line, outside news had arrived via steam ship days or weeks after the fact.

The office was operated by Army personnel. The front room of the building was open to the public, who could send and receive messages. The central part of the ground floor served as the operator's station, while workers lived on the second floor. Service continued until an earthquake severed the telegraph line in 1934. By that time, radio communication had been established by the Navy and the line was not replaced. The government retained ownership until 1961. Since then, the building has served as a private residence and as rented apartments.

The building was listed on the National Register of Historic Places in 1980.

== See also ==
- National Register of Historic Places listings in Kenai Peninsula Borough, Alaska
