= Lauritsen Cabin =

Historic house in Alaska, United States

- U.S. National Register of Historic Places
- Alaska Heritage Resources Survey
- Location within Alaska
- Location: Along west bank of Lake Creek, Mile 48 of Seward Highway
- Nearest city: Moose Pass, Alaska
- Coordinates: 60°40′22″N 149°28′27″W
- Area: less than one acre
- Built: 1896
- Built by: Polly Mining Company
- NRHP reference No.: 79003761
- AHRS No.: SEW-152

Significant dates
- Added to NRHP: October 16, 1979
- Designated AHRS: July 14, 1977

The Lauritsen Cabin is a historic miner's cabin in the Chugach Mountains of the Kenai Peninsula in south-central Alaska. It is located a short way east of mile 48 of the Seward Highway, at the confluence of Mill and Canyon Creeks. It is built of hand-hewn logs fitted tightly with dovetail notches, and features a ridge pole hewn in a curve to provide for a hip-shaped roof. The building measures about 27 by 13 feet (8.2 m × 4.0 m). The cabin was built in 1896, and may have been among the first cabins built in the gold rush that swept the area in the late 19th century.

The cabin was listed on the National Register of Historic Places in 1979.

== See also ==
- National Register of Historic Places listings in Kenai Peninsula Borough, Alaska
