= Kasilof, Alaska =

Kasilof, Alaska Ggasilat (Denaʼina) Касилов (Russian)
- Census-designated place
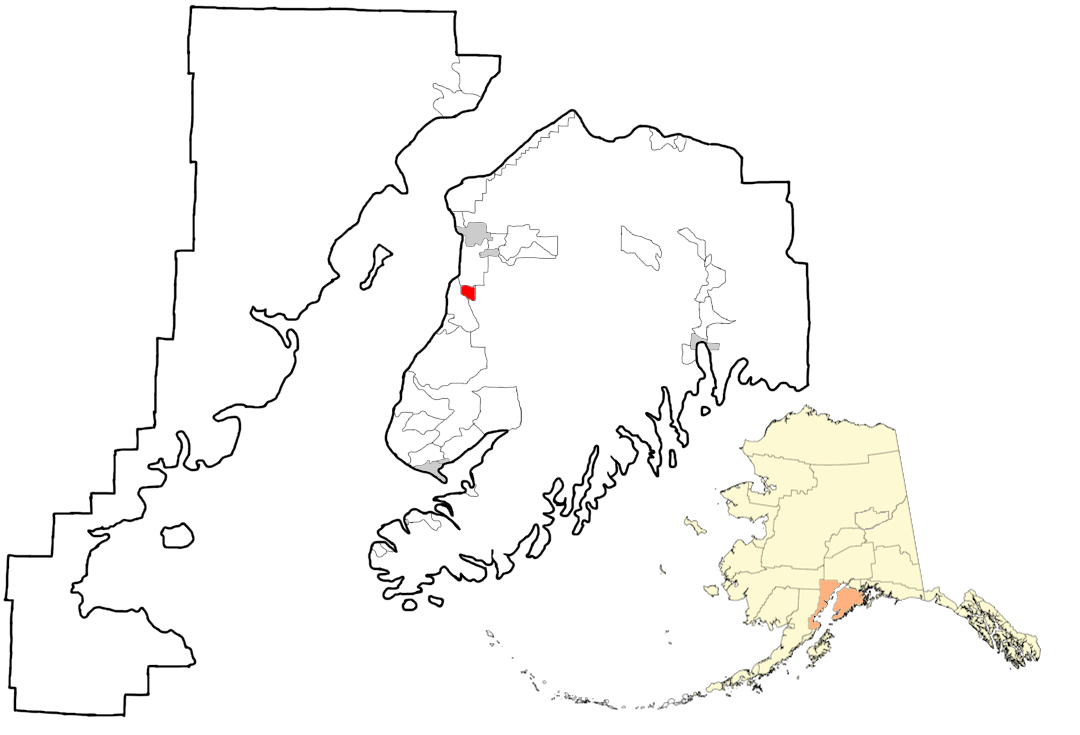
- Location in Kenai Peninsula Borough, Alaska
- Coordinates: 60°20′7″N 151°14′1″W
- Country: United States
- State: Alaska
- Borough: Kenai Peninsula

Government
  - Borough mayor: Peter Micciche
  - State senator: Gary Stevens (R)
  - State rep.: Sarah Vance (R)

Area
  - Total: 10.63 sq mi (27.52 km^{2})
  - Land: 10.42 sq mi (27.00 km^{2})
  - Water: 0.20 sq mi (0.52 km^{2})
- Elevation: 125 ft (38 m)

Population (2020)
  - Total: 525
  - Density: 50.3/sq mi (19.44/km^{2})
- Time zone: UTC-9 (Alaska (AKST))
  - Summer (DST): UTC-8 (AKDT)
- ZIP code: 99610
- Area code: 907
- FIPS code: 02-38090
- GNIS feature ID: 1413283

Kasilof (/kəˈsiːlɒf/ kə-SEE-lof; Dena'ina: Ggasilat, Russian: Касилов) is a census-designated place (CDP) in Kenai Peninsula Borough, Alaska, United States. At the 2020 census the population was 525, down from 549 in 2010.

== Geography ==
Kasilof is located at 60°20′7″N 151°14′1″W (60.335274, -151.233594). It is on the east side of the Cook Inlet on the Kenai Peninsula, on the Sterling Highway, 19 km (12 mi) south Kenai and 62 miles (100 km) north of Homer. It is bordered to the southwest by the Kasilof River, across which is the community of Cohoe. To the north, across Coal Creek, is the community of Kalifornsky.

According to the United States Census Bureau, the Kasilof CDP has a total area of 10.6 square miles (27.5 km^{2}), of which 10.4 square miles (27.0 km^{2}) are land and 0.2 square miles (0.5 km^{2}), or 1.89%, are water.

== Demographics ==
Historical population
Census	Pop.	Note	%±
1880	31		—
1890	117		277.4%
1900	159		35.9%
1930	45		—
1940	62		37.8%
1950	62		0.0%
1960	89		43.5%
1970	71		−20.2%
1980	201		183.1%
1990	383		90.5%
2000	471		23.0%
2010	549		16.6%
2020	525		−4.4%
U.S. Decennial Census

Kasilof first appeared on the 1880 U.S. Census as an unincorporated village named "Kassilof." It appeared again in 1890, and in 1900 its name was shortened to the current spelling, Kasilof. It did not appear again on the census until 1930. In 1980, it was made a census-designated place (CDP).

As of the census of 2000, there were 471 people, 180 households, and 124 families residing in the CDP. The population density was 45.4 inhabitants per square mile (17.5/km^{2}). There were 208 housing units at an average density of 20.1 per square mile (7.8/km^{2}). The racial makeup of the CDP was 92.36% White, 3.18% Native American, 0.64% Black or African American, 0.21% Asian, 0.21% from other races, and 3.40% from two or more races. 0.21% of the population were Hispanic or Latino of any race.

There were 180 households, out of which 33.9% had children under the age of 18 living with them, 57.8% were married couples living together, 7.2% had a female householder with no husband present, and 30.6% were non-families. 22.8% of all households were made up of individuals, and 2.2% had someone living alone who was 65 years of age or older. The average household size was 2.62 and the average family size was 3.06.

In the CDP, the population was spread out, with 27.4% under the age of 18, 5.1% from 18 to 24, 28.0% from 25 to 44, 31.4% from 45 to 64, and 8.1% who were 65 years of age or older. The median age was 40 years. For every 100 females, there were 107.5 males. For every 100 females age 18 and over, there were 111.1 males.

The median income for a household in the CDP was $43,929, and the median income for a family was $58,036. Males had a median income of $45,469 versus $12,143 for females. The per capita income for the CDP was $21,211. About 21.4% of families and 26.4% of the population were below the poverty line, including 35.8% of those under age 18 and 39.1% of those age 65 or over.

== History ==
In 1786 a detachment of Russians employed by the Lebedev-Lastochkin Company built an artel at the location of modern Kasilof for fishing operations. While it likely received expansions, it "never played a significant role in the history of the Russian colonies." An agricultural settlement of Dena'ina people grew up around the stockade. During the establishment of the Russian-American Company, a fur monopoly in Russian America, the assets of the LLC were liquidated. The area became known as Kasilof after the Kasilof River in the 1800s. A partial excavation of the area in 1937 found 31 well-preserved houses from the settlement. As of 2011 most residents are non-Native.
