= Tustumena Lake =

Lake in Alaska, USA

- Dusdu Bena (Denaʼina)
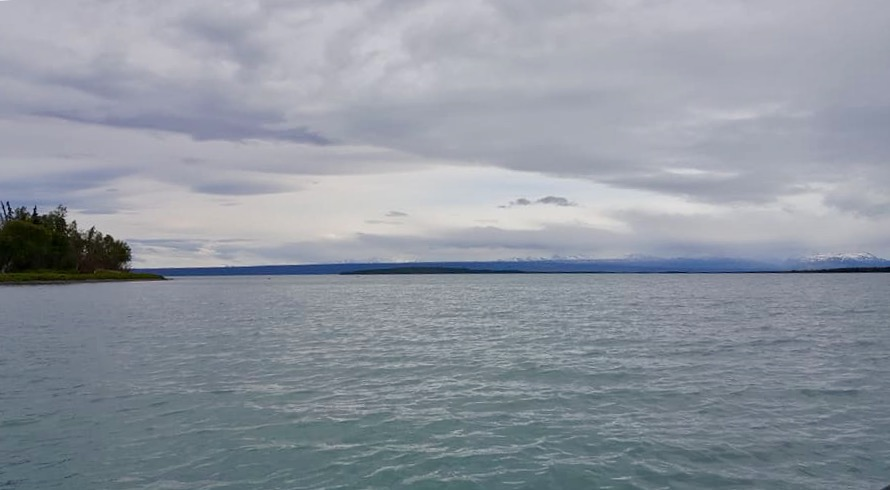
- The lower end of the lake seen from the Kasilof River outflow

- Location within Alaska Location within North America
- Location: Kenai Peninsula, Alaska
- Coordinates: 60°13′46″N 150°56′28″W
- Primary inflows: Glacier Creek, other small streams
- Primary outflows: Kasilof River
- Basin countries: United States
- Max. length: 25 miles (40 km)
- Max. width: 6 miles (9.7 km)
- Surface area: 73,000 acres (30,000 ha)
- Average depth: 80 feet (24 m)
- Max. depth: 950 feet (290 m)
- Shore length^{1}: 71 miles (114 km)
- Surface elevation: 112 feet (34 m)
- Islands: Caribou Island
- ^{1} Shore length is not a well-defined measure.

Tustumena Lake (Dena'ina: Dusdu Bena) is a lake on the west side of the Kenai Peninsula in southcentral Alaska, within Kenai National Wildlife Refuge and near the town of Kasilof. Access is only via the Kasilof River, as there are no roads that lead directly to the lake.

== Overview ==
At 73,437 acres (297.19 km^{2}) Tustumena Lake is Alaska's eighth largest lake and the largest lake on the Kenai Peninsula. With a maximum depth of 950 feet (290 m), Tustumena Lake is exceptionally deep; it is deeper than Cook Inlet. The lake is 25 miles (40 km) long and up to 6 miles (9.7 km) wide and receives drainage from Tustumena Glacier, and several creeks.| The outlet forms the headwaters of the Kasilof River. The lake and the area around it are known for game hunting, and for the Tustumena 200 Sled Dog Race. Most of the land surrounding the lake is in the Kenai National Wildlife Refuge. This lake has a reputation for being very dangerous to small boats due to the high winds that regularly blow off of Tustumena Glacier.

== History ==
Early Russian explorers wrongly believed that this lake and Skilak Lake were a single body of water. Early trophy hunters from the 1890s and later took world record moose from the north shore, and the first hunting guide to obtain a license to guide hunters in the State of Alaska called this area home.
