= Kasilof River =

Coordinates: 60°23′19″N 151°18′11″W

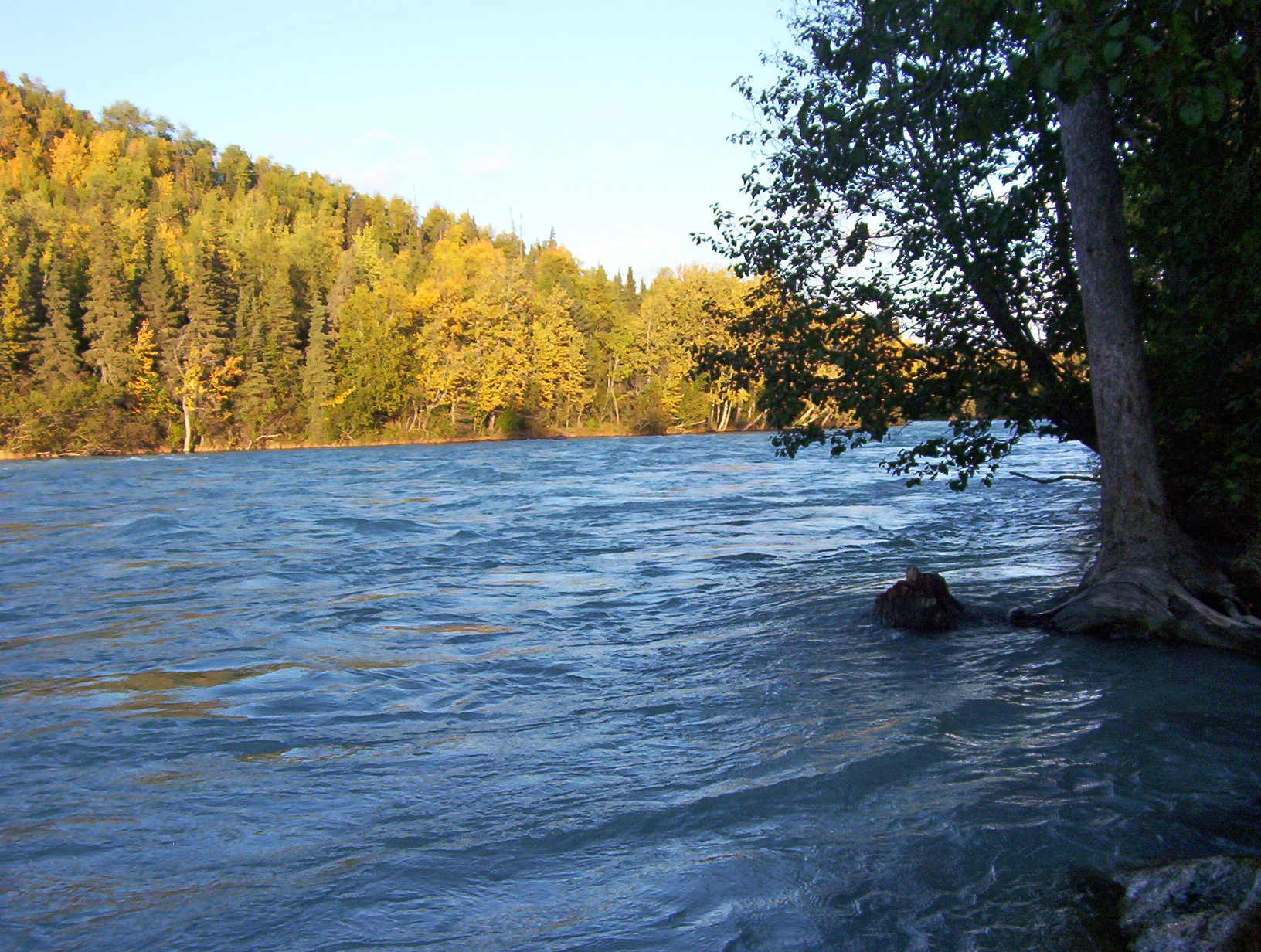
- The silty glacial content of the river produces the milky blue coloration

Location
- Country: United States
- State: Alaska

Physical characteristics
- Source
  - location: Tustumena Lake
- Mouth
  - location: Cook Inlet, Kenai Peninsula Borough, Alaska
  - elevation: sea level
- Length: 17 mi (27 km)

The Kasilof River (/kəˈsiːlɒf/ kə-SEE-lof) or Ggasilatnu in the Dena'ina language is a river on the western Kenai Peninsula in southern Alaska. The name is an anglicization of Reka Kasilova, the name given to the river by early Russian settlers in the area. It begins at Tustumena Lake and flows northwest to Cook Inlet near Kasilof. The upper section of the river is very swift, with several sections considered Class II whitewater, and underwater hazards are difficult to detect, due to the silty nature of the glacial runoff that comprises most of the river. The entire river has powerful currents and is very cold. There is public access to the lower section from the Sterling Highway. Drift and bank fishing for salmon is popular on the lower Kasilof.

== Parks ==
Three Alaska State Parks units are on or near the Kasilof River. At mile 109 of the Sterling Highway, adjacent to the bridge where the highway crosses the river is the Kasilof River State Recreation Site, a day-use only park with picnic areas and a boat launch. The Crooked Creek State Recreation Site has a large campground and walk-in access to the point where Crooked Creek joins the river, a prime salmon fishing spot. Johnson Lake State Recreation Area is situated on 332 acres (134 ha) wooded acres on the shores of Johnson Lake. It has a large campground, picnic areas, and access to the Tustumena Lake road, which ends at the Slackwater boat launch on the river with a small, free campground.

== See also ==
- List of Alaska rivers
