= Port Graham, Alaska =

Port Graham, Alaska Paluwik
- Census-designated place
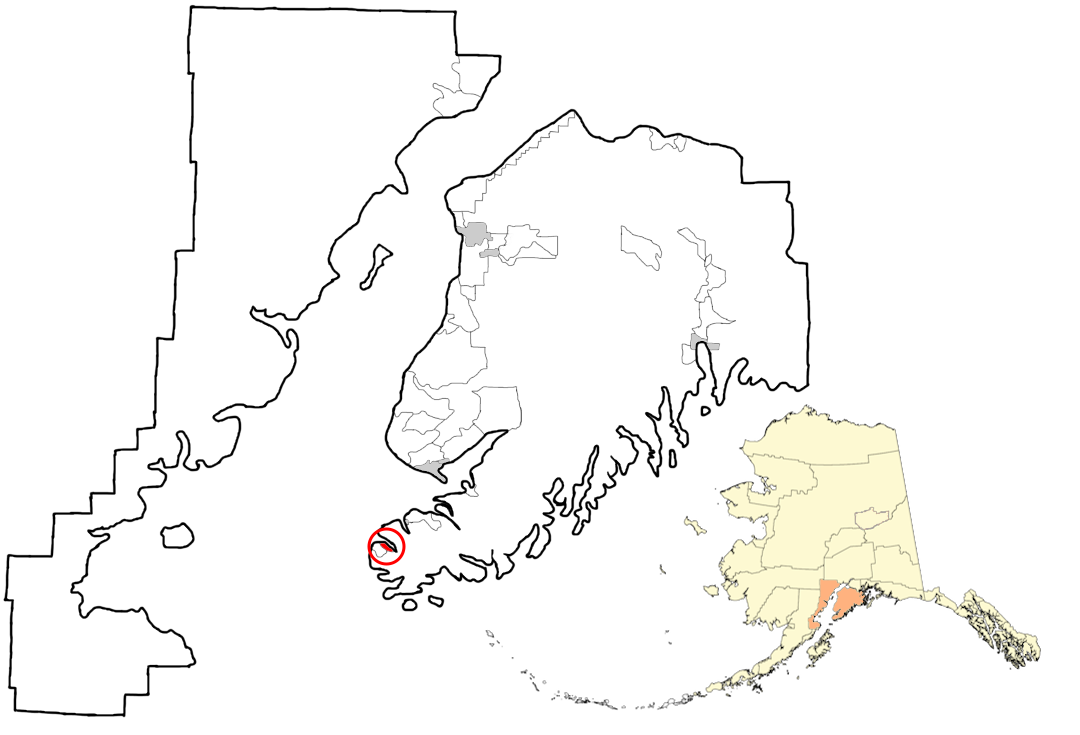
- Location in Kenai Peninsula Borough, Alaska
- Coordinates: 59°20′52″N 151°50′0″W
- Country: United States
- State: Alaska
- Borough: Kenai Peninsula

Government
  - Borough mayor: Peter Micciche
  - State senator: Lyman Hoffman (D)
  - State rep.: Bryce Edgmon (I)

Area
  - Total: 6.39 sq mi (16.56 km^{2})
  - Land: 6.39 sq mi (16.56 km^{2})
  - Water: 0 sq mi (0.00 km^{2})
- Elevation: 20 ft (6.1 m)

Population (2020)
  - Total: 162
  - Density: 25.3/sq mi (9.78/km^{2})
- Time zone: UTC-9 (Alaska (AKST))
  - Summer (DST): UTC-8 (AKDT)
- ZIP code: 99603
- Area code: 907
- FIPS code: 02-63280

Port Graham, also known as Paluwik (/ˈpɑːluːwɪɡ/) in the Alutiiq language, is a census-designated place (CDP) in Kenai Peninsula Borough, Alaska, United States. At the 2020 census, the population was 162.

== Geography ==
Port Graham and Nanwalek are located near the southern tip of the Kenai Peninsula and are separated by less than 5 miles (8 km). Although they have local roads, there is no road access into this area. All vehicles must be brought in by barge or ferry. Both villages are accessible by air or water. They lie 22 miles (35 km) southwest of Homer and about 7 miles (11 km) by air from Seldovia. The Alaska Marine Highway System provides ferry service to all of Kachemak Bay, the water body separating Port Graham, Nanwalek and Seldovia from Homer.

Port Graham is located at 59°20′52″N 151°50′0″W (59.347736, -151.833420). According to the United States Census Bureau, the CDP has a total area of 6.4 square miles (16.5 km^{2}), all of it recorded as land.

== Demographics ==
Historical population
Census	Pop.	Note	%±
1920	47		—
1940	93		—
1950	92		−1.1%
1960	139		51.1%
1970	107		−23.0%
1980	161		50.5%
1990	166		3.1%
2000	171		3.0%
2010	177		3.5%
2020	162		−8.5%
U.S. Decennial Census

Port Graham first appeared on the 1920 U.S. Census as an unincorporated village. It did not appear on the 1930 census, but returned in 1940 and in every subsequent census. It was made a census-designated place (CDP) in 1980.

As of the census of 2000, there were 171 people, 70 households, and 46 families residing in the CDP. The population density was 28.8 inhabitants per square mile (11.1/km^{2}). There were 82 housing units at an average density of 13.8 per square mile (5.3/km^{2}). The racial makeup of the CDP was 11.11% White, 84.80% Native American, 0.58% from other races, and 3.51% from two or more races. 3.51% of the population were Hispanic or Latino of any race.

There were 70 households, out of which 35.7% had children under the age of 18 living with them, 38.6% were married couples living together, 17.1% had a female householder with no husband present, and 32.9% were non-families. 28.6% of all households were made up of individuals, and 2.9% had someone living alone who was 65 years of age or older. The average household size was 2.44 and the average family size was 2.98.

In the CDP, the population was spread out, with 30.4% under the age of 18, 4.1% from 18 to 24, 29.8% from 25 to 44, 25.1% from 45 to 64, and 10.5% who were 65 years of age or older. The median age was 38 years. For every 100 females, there were 113.8 males. For every 100 females age 18 and over, there were 108.8 males.

The median income for a household in the CDP was $40,250, and the median income for a family was $43,438. Males had a median income of $36,250 versus $14,250 for females. The per capita income for the CDP was $13,666. About 15.1% of families and 18.8% of the population were below the poverty line, including 25.9% of those under the age of eighteen and 11.1% of those 65 or over.
