= Skyview High School (Alaska) =

Location
- 46188 Sterling Highway; Soldotna, Alaska 99669; United States
- Coordinates: 60°27′28″N 151°06′04″W

Information
- Type: Comprehensive public high school
- Established: 1989
- Closed: 2014
- School district: Kenai Peninsula
- Principal: Randy Neill
- Enrollment: ~400
- Colors: Purple, black, and white
- Team name: Panthers
- Website: web.archive.org/web/20130704114139/http://skyviewhighschool.blogs.kpbsd.k12.ak.us/wpmu/

Skyview High School was a four-year public school, serving grades 9 through 12. The school is located along the Sterling Highway in Kalifornsky, Alaska, a short distance south of Soldotna city limits and directly west of the boundary of the Kenai National Wildlife Refuge. The school's attendance area covered an approximately 75–mile stretch of the Sterling Highway, from Tern Lake (on the western edge of the Moose Pass CDP boundary) to Cohoe. This area includes Cooper Landing and Kasilof, and portions of Kalifornsky, Soldotna and Sterling. The remainder of the central Kenai Peninsula was served by Soldotna High School and Kenai Central High School.

Skyview also housed River City Academy (RCA), an alternative school for students who want to get ahead or who are falling behind. RCA consists of roughly 50 to 75 students. In 2014, RCA was moved to the Soldotna Prep School building, formerly Soldotna Middle School.

== History ==
Skyview High School opened in 1989, and is the newest school on the Kenai Peninsula. It was built to relieve the over-crowded Soldotna High School.

Skyview High School closed at the end of the 2013–2014 school year and the building was converted into Skyview Middle School. The student populations from Skyview and Soldotna High School were combined and attended classes at the current Soldotna High School campus starting in the fall of 2014.

== Sports ==
Skyview offered the following sports: wrestling, football, volleyball (women's), softball (women's), soccer, cross country running, cross country skiing, cheerleading, track and field, basketball, hockey, and swimming.
