= Alan Boraas =

American anthropologist

- Born: May 17, 1947
- Died: November 4, 2019 (aged 72)

Academic background
- Education: University of Alaska Fairbanks; University of Minnesota College of Liberal Arts; University of Toronto

Alan S. Boraas (April 17, 1947 – November 4, 2019) is a professor of anthropology at Kenai Peninsula College in Alaska. He is known for his research into the culture, history, and archaeology of the peoples of the Cook Inlet area of Alaska, and in particular has worked closely with the Dena'ina people of the Kenai Peninsula. He is an adopted honorary member of the Kenaitze Indian Tribe, and is helping the tribe develop a program to teach the Dena'ina language.

With James Kari of the Alaska Native Language Center, Boraas coedited the book Dena'ina Legacy — K'tl'egh'i Sukdu: The Collected Writings of Peter Kalifornsky by Peter Kalifornsky. Boraas also wrote the biography of Kalifornsky included in the volume.

== Education ==
- Oregon State University, Ph.D. (1983), Anthropology
- University of Toronto, M.A. (1971), Anthropology
- University of Minnesota, B.A. (1969), Anthropology; minor in Geology

== Biography ==
=== B.A. and M.A. ===
Boraas was raised on a wheat farm in Minnesota. After high school he attended University of Minnesota in Minneapolis. On a whim, he took a class in anthropology in his freshman year, and loved it so much that he sought out a summer position as an archaeological helper, though normally the school hired only graduate students. His persistence paid off and he was offered work at an archaeological dig at Mille Lacs, Minnesota, where his farm background came in handy, as he was one of the few students who could operate the heavy equipment used to move dirt away from the site after initial excavation by hand. A highlight of his work there was his first archaeological find: a red stone spear point that he found in 1966. When he took it to the director, he was told, "That's about 2,000 years old." The experience hooked him on archaeology. He worked on the Mille Lacs project for two summers, then worked a summer with an on-call team responsible for evaluating archaeological finds at construction projects and other such happenstance discoveries. He graduated from University of Minnesota in 1969 with a B.A. in anthropology and a minor in geology.

His choice of school for pursuit of a higher degree was arbitrary: the first university catalog on the shelf for the As was for University of Alaska Fairbanks (UAF). He attended UAF for a year and worked the following summer with a UAF team scouting the route of the upcoming Trans-Alaska Pipeline for archaeological sites. He then transferred to University of Toronto, where he earned a Master of Arts in Anthropology in 1971.

=== Early work on Kenai Peninsula ===
He returned to Alaska, living in a city campground in Soldotna because it was inexpensive. He worked in a local cannery and helped build a cabin that is now part of the Soldotna Historical Society building. On his last day of work on the cabin, he was approached by Clayton Brockel, founding director of Kenai Peninsula Community College, who asked him if he would like to teach Adult Basic Education. Boraas worked half-time at the college helping adults earn high school equivalency degrees. He also taught Adult Basic Education at Wildwood, a former air force station that had been transferred to the Kenai Native Association as part of the Alaska Native land claims settlement. At Wildwood, Boraas made his first contacts with members of the Kenai Peninsula's Alaska Native community. Boraas credited the teaching of Adult Basic Education with helping him learn that he could teach, and also the impact that teaching could have in people's lives. He credited the classes such as those held at Wildwood, funded through the Indian Action Program of the Bureau of Indian Affairs, with contributing to the improvement of people's lives and communities, and helping to produce a generation of Native leaders.

By 1974, Boraas was teaching full-time, with half his time spent teaching Adult Basic Education, the other half spent teaching anthropology. He undertook his first archaeological dig in Alaska in 1974 along Ciechanski Road, at what proved to be a Dena'ina site. Then he decided to undertake a dig at Kalifornsky village, which had been abandoned in the late 1920s after an influenza epidemic left the population too small to sustain a village. Although the site was on land owned by the Kenai Peninsula Borough, Boraas felt it was right to ask former villagers for their permission to excavate the site. He met with Peter Kalifornsky, who had been born in Kalifornsky village in 1911, and his older sister Mary Nissen. Boraas recalled that Mary Nissen "grilled me like a graduate school exam." Kalifornsky and Nissen gave their permission for the dig, but did impose some restrictions, which Boraas and his team respected.

=== Doctoral degree ===
In 1979, Boraas left Alaska to study for his doctoral degree. His dissertation was far removed from archaeology: its subject was the evolution of specialization between the right and left sides of the brain. He earned his doctorate from Oregon State University at Corvallis in 1983. He returned to Soldotna and worked with Kenai Peninsula Community College and the Pratt Museum in Homer on an archaeological dig near Halibut Cove on Kachemak Bay, where remains were found both of Dena'ina occupation and of remains from an earlier occupation by a seagoing Alutiiq people known as the Kachemak Tradition.

=== Peter Kalifornsky's A Dena'ina Legacy ===
In March 1989, Peter Kalifornsky's younger sister Fedosia Sacaloff died, leaving Kalifornsky as the last remaining speaker of the Outer Inlet dialect of the Dena'ina language on the Kenai Peninsula. At his sister's funeral, Kalifornsky asked Boraas and James Kari for their help on his third book, in which Kalifornsky wished to compile everything he had ever written. James Kari, a linguist at the Alaska Native Language Center at University of Alaska Fairbanks, had been working with Kalifornsky since 1972 on the Dena'ina language. Kalifornsky had written the materials in the book over a 19-year period, first writing them in Dena'ina and then translating them into English. Boraas and Kari helped to refine the English translations and acted as editors. Kalifornsky's book was published in 1991 under the title Dena'ina Legacy — K'tl'egh'i Sukdu: The Collected Writings of Peter Kalifornsky. Boraas also wrote a biography of Kalifornsky which was included in the volume. Kalifornsky died in June 1993 of lung cancer. Boraas later related to an interviewer that during work on the book, Kalifornsky had related "long soliloquies" about Dena'ina life to help Boraas better understand the stories and the meanings of Dena'ina words. Boraas recorded Kalifornsky's accounts on tape, but as of 2000, when the interview took place, he felt unready to go back to them because of the intensity of the emotional experience.

=== Later work ===
Boraas has studied the letters of Alexander Baranof in translation in order to better understand the Battle of Kenai, a 1797 battle in which the Dena'ina attacked the Russian fort at Kenai to drive out the Lebedev-Lastochkin Company. The 1799 Charter of the Russian America Company created a company with quasi-governmental powers in Alaska. The Cook Inlet region was ignored as the company sought sea otter pelts all the way down the coast to Chile. Trade reintensified in Cook Inlet once the otters were hunted nearly to extinction on the west coast of North and South America; however, the terms of the fur trade were much different than under the independent companies or the management of Alexander Baranov. Boraas has also been studying the social impact of salmon canneries in the late 19th and early 20th centuries. He has worked with the Kenaitze Indian Tribe to help with its response to the Native American Graves Protection and Repatriation Act and is working with the tribe to develop a program to teach the Dena'ina language. Sasha Lindgren, a tribal enrollment officer who also worked seven years in the tribe's cultural heritage program, told an interviewer in 2000, "Alan is the one who said our language needs to become the literary language for the peninsula, just like Gaelic is the literary language for Ireland."

In 2002, Boraas attended the Renvall Institute at the University of Helsinki in Finland. Boraas's presentation at the conference, which had the theme "Reconfiguring Native America," focused on the efforts of the Kenaitze Indian Tribe to rebuild indigenous identity. He also described archaeological excavations he was conducting with Kenaitze youth.

A number of Boraas' works are referenced in the Bibliography of Sources on Dena’ina and Cook Inlet Anthropology, of which he is coeditor. Boraas also compiled an online source on the Dena'ina language based on linguistic data compiled by Joan Tenenbaum.

Boraas writes a monthly column for the Anchorage Daily News called "The Comment."
