= List of places in Alaska (K) =

This list of cities, towns, unincorporated communities, counties, and other recognized places in the U.S. state of Alaska also includes information on the number and names of counties in which the place lies, and its lower and upper zip code bounds, if applicable.

Name of place	Number of counties	Principal county	Lower zip code	Upper zip code
Kachemak City	1	Kenai Peninsula Borough	99603	
Kachemak Silo	1	Kenai Peninsula Borough		
Kaguyak	1	Kodiak Island Borough		
Kake	1	Wrangell-Petersburg Census Area	99830	
Kake City School District	1	Wrangell-Petersburg Census Area		
Kakhonak	1	Lake and Peninsula Borough		
Kakhonak	1	Dillingham Census Area		
Kako Landing	1	Kusilvak Census Area		
Kaktovik	1	North Slope Borough	99747	
Kalakaket Creek Radio Relay Site	1	Yukon-Koyukuk Census Area	99741	
Kalifornsky (census-designated place)	1	Kenai Peninsula Borough		
Kalifornsky village	1	Kenai Peninsula Borough		
Kalla	1	Northwest Arctic Borough		
Kallands	1	Yukon-Koyukuk Census Area		
Kalskag	1	Bethel Census Area	99607	
Kaltag	1	Yukon-Koyukuk Census Area	99748	
Kanapak	1	Kusilvak Census Area		
Kanatak	1	Kodiak Island Borough		
Kanatak	1	Matanuska-Susitna Borough		
Kantishna	1	Denali Borough		
Karluk	1	Kodiak Island Borough	99608	
Kasaan	1	Prince of Wales-Outer Census Area	99901	
Kashegelok	1	Bethel Census Area	99668	
Kashiagamiut	1	Dillingham Census Area		
Kashunamiut Regional Educational Attendance Area	1	Kusilvak Census Area		
Kashwitna	1	Matanuska-Susitna Borough		
Kasigluk	1	Bethel Census Area	99609	
Kasilof	1	Kenai Peninsula Borough	99610	
Katalla	1	Valdez-Cordova Census Area		
Katmai National Park	1	Dillingham Census Area	99501	
Keene Channel	1	Wrangell-Petersburg Census Area		
Kenai	1	Kenai Peninsula Borough	99611	
Kenai-Cook Inlet	1	Kenai Peninsula Borough		
Kenai Fjords National Park	1	Kenai Peninsula Borough	99501	
Kenai Lake	1	Kenai Peninsula Borough	99572	
Kenai Peninsula Borough School District	1	Kenai Peninsula Borough		
Kenaitze	1	Kenai Peninsula Borough		
Kennicott	1	Valdez-Cordova Census Area	99566	
Kenny Lake	1	Valdez-Cordova Census Area		
Ketchikan	1	Ketchikan Gateway Borough	99901	
Ketchikan	1	Ketchikan Gateway Borough		
Ketchikan Coast Guard Base	1	Ketchikan Gateway Borough	99901	
Ketchikan East	1	Ketchikan Gateway Borough		
Ketchikan Gateway Borough School District	1	Ketchikan Gateway Borough		
Ketchikan International Airport	1	Ketchikan Gateway Borough	99901	
Keyaluvik	1	Bethel Census Area		
Kiana	1	Northwest Arctic Borough	99749	
Kinegnak	1	Bethel Census Area		
King Cove	1	Aleutians East Borough	99612	
Kingegan	1	Nome Census Area		
King Island	1	Nome Census Area		
King Salmon	1	Bristol Bay Borough	99613	
King Salmon Airport	1	Bristol Bay Borough	99613	
Kipnuk	1	Bethel Census Area	99614	
Kiska Island	1	Aleutians West Census Area		
Kivalina	1	Northwest Arctic Borough	99750	
Kiwalik	1	Northwest Arctic Borough		
Klatt Road	1	Municipality of Anchorage		
Klawak	1	Prince of Wales-Outer Census Area		
Klawock	1	Prince of Wales-Outer Census Area	99925	
Klawock City School District	1	Prince of Wales-Outer Census Area		
Klery Creek	1	Northwest Arctic Borough		
Klikitarik	1	Nome Census Area		
Klondike Gold Rush National Historic Park	1	Skagway-Hoonah-Angoon Census Area		
Klukwan	1	Skagway-Hoonah-Angoon Census Area	99827	
Klukwan	1	Skagway-Hoonah-Angoon Census Area		
Knik	1	Matanuska-Susitna Borough	99687	
Knik-Fairview	1	Matanuska-Susitna Borough		
Knik River	1	Matanuska-Susitna Borough		
Knudson Cove	1	Ketchikan Gateway Borough		
Kobuk	1	Northwest Arctic Borough	99751	
Kobuk	1	Northwest Arctic Borough		
Kobuk Valley National Park	1	Northwest Arctic Borough	99501	
Kodiak	1	Kodiak Island Borough	99615	
Kodiak Airport	1	Kodiak Island Borough	99615	
Kodiak Coast Guard Station	1	Kodiak Island Borough	99615	
Kodiak Island	1	Kodiak Island Borough		
Kodiak Island Borough School District	1	Kodiak Island Borough		
Kodiak Station	1	Kodiak Island Borough		
Koggiung	1	Bristol Bay Borough		
Kokhanok	1	Lake and Peninsula Borough	99606	
Kokrines	1	Yukon-Koyukuk Census Area	99768	
Kokruagarok	1	North Slope Borough		
Koliganek	1	Dillingham Census Area	99576	
Kongiganak	1	Bethel Census Area	99559	
Koniag	1	Kodiak Island Borough		
Kotlik	1	Kusilvak Census Area	99620	
Kotzebue	1	Northwest Arctic Borough	99752	
Koyuk	1	Nome Census Area	99753	
Koyukuk	1	Yukon-Koyukuk Census Area	99754	
Koyukuk-Middle Yukon	1	Yukon-Koyukuk Census Area		
Kravaksarak	1	Kusilvak Census Area		
Kupreanof	1	Wrangell-Petersburg Census Area	99833	
Kuskovak	1	Bethel Census Area		
Kuspuk Regional Educational Attendance Area	2	Bethel Census Area		
Kuspuk Regional Educational Attendance Area	2	Kusilvak Census Area		
Kustatan	1	Kenai Peninsula Borough	99682	
Kvichak	1	Lake and Peninsula Borough		
Kwethluk	1	Bethel Census Area	99621	
Kwigillingok	1	Bethel Census Area	99622	
Kwigorlak	1	Kusilvak Census Area		
Kwikpak	1	Kusilvak Census Area		
Kwinhagak (Quinhagak)	1	Bethel Census Area	99655	
