= Stephanie Herring =

American climate scientist

- Education: Yale University
- Scientific career
- Fields: Climate science Biochemistry
- Workplaces: NOAA
- Thesis: Pyrrolysyl-tRNa synthetase recognition of tRNA(Pyl) in Desulfitobacterium hafniense and Methanosarcina barkeri (2007)
- Doctoral advisor: Dieter Söll

Stephanie C. Herring is an American climate scientist and government official. She currently serves as special advisor to the NOAA assistant secretary for environmental observations and predictions. She is also chief of the Geophysical Science Branch at NOAA's National Centers for Environmental Information (NCEI) in Boulder, Colorado.

== Early life and education ==
Herring graduated from Homer High School in Homer, Alaska, where she competed in track and diving and was listed in the 1994-1995 edition of Who’s Who Among American High School Students. Following graduation, she spent a summer working for U.S. Senator Ted Stevens in Washington, D.C., before starting college.

Herring pursued her undergraduate education at Swarthmore College, receiving a Bachelor of Arts degree in biochemistry before completing a PhD in molecular biophysics and biochemistry from Yale University, working under the advisorship of Dr. Dieter Söll.

== Career ==
After completing her PhD, Herring obtained a postdoc position at the National Institutes for Health (NIH). From 2007 to 2008, she served as an American Association for the Advancement of Science (AAAS) Congressional Fellow for U.S. Representative Ed Markey, advising him in his capacity as chairman of the Select Committee on Energy Independence and Global Warming. Her experience working on Capitol Hill led to her career at NOAA, first working at NOAA Headquarters for Mary Glackin, who was then Deputy Under Secretary for Operations for the agency. Over the next 15 years, Herring held a variety of positions with the agency, leading to her current role at NCEI.

From 2010 to 2020, Herring served as editor of Explaining Extreme Events from a Climate Perspective, which was published as a special supplement to the Bulletin of the American Meteorological Society.

== Honors and awards ==
Herring is the recipient of multiple awards for her work, including a 2015 NOAA Administrator's Award for her contributions as part of a team providing “leadership and outstanding contributions in developing, supporting, and implementing the third National Climate Assessment.”

In 2013, she was one of three NOAA scientists who, along with a colleague from the UK Met Office, were named among Foreign Policy’s annual list of “Top 100 Global Thinkers.”

In 2024, Herring was elected to serve a three-year term (beginning in 2025) as a councilor for the American Meteorological Society (AMS).
