= Peter Kalifornsky =

Alaska Native writer (1911–1993)

- Born: October 12, 1911; Kalifornsky Village, District of Alaska
- Died: June 5, 1993 (aged 81); Nikiski, Alaska
- Occupations: writer, ethnographer, translator
- Writing career
- Subjects: Dena'ina stories, traditions, and language

Peter Kalifornsky (October 12, 1911 – June 5, 1993) was a writer and ethnographer of the Dena'ina Athabaskan of Kenai, Alaska.

== Early life, family and education ==
He was the great-great-grandson of Qadanalchen, who took the name Kalifornsky after working in the Russian American colony of Fort Ross in California. (Kalifornsky, Alaska was named for him.)

== Career ==
Kalifornsky wrote traditional stories, poems, and language lessons in the Outer Inlet dialect (sometimes called the Kenai dialect) of Dena'ina, a language of the Athabaskan language group. As a Dena'ina elder, Kalifornsky participated in creating the written version of the Dena'ina language. Over 19 years, he worked to record as many sukdu (traditional stories) as he could remember, translating them also into English. He also wrote original works in Dena'ina, including a number of autobiographical works.

Near the end of his life, he worked with linguist James Kari of the Alaska Native Language Center and anthropologist Alan Boraas of Kenai Peninsula College to compile his collected works. Published in 1991, A Dena'ina Legacy — K'tl'egh'i Sukdu: The Collected Writings of Peter Kalifornsky contains 147 bilingual Dena'ina-English writings. Throughout most of the volume, the original Dena'ina appears on the left-hand page and the English translation appears opposite, on the right page.

== Works by Peter Kalifornsky ==
This bibliography is based upon "Kalifornskyana," the bibliography of Kalifornsky's works included in A Dena'ina Legacy. However, the bibliography has been reordered and citations are rendered in a different citation style. As with the original bibliography, materials not included in A Dena'ina Legacy are marked with a cross † — here placed after the date. A double-cross ‡ is used for one item from which most but not all materials are included in A Dena'ina Legacy.

=== Published works ===
==== Books ====
- 1977; revised 1981. Kahtnuht'ana Qenaga: The Kenai People's Language. Ed. by James Kari. Fairbanks, AK: Alaska Native Language Center, University of Alaska Fairbanks, 140 pages.
- 1984. K'tl'egh'i Sukdu: Remaining Stories. Ed. by Jane McGary and James Kari. Fairbanks, AK: Alaska Native Language Center, University of Alaska Fairbanks, 124 pages.
- 1991. A Dena'ina Legacy — K'tl'egh'i Sukdu: The Collected Writings of Peter Kalifornsky. Ed. by James Kari and Alan Boraas. Fairbanks, Alaska: Alaska Native Language Center, University of Alaska Fairbanks.

==== Shorter works ====
- 1974. K'eła Sukdu, The Mouse Story. Fairbanks, AK: Alaska Native Language Center, University of Alaska Fairbanks. 7 pages.
- 1974. Ch'enlahi Sukdu, The Gambling Story. Fairbanks, AK: Alaska Native Language Center, University of Alaska Fairbanks. 11 pages.
- 1975. "The Lord's Prayer." Orthodox Alaska 5:51.
- 1975. "Qunshi Uquch'el'ani, Beluga Hunting." In James Kari, ed., Dena'ina T'qit'ach': The Way the Tanaina Are. Fairbanks, AK: Alaska Native Language Center, University of Alaska Fairbanks, pp. 16–18.
- 1976. [Dena'ina numbers.] [Page numbers handwritten in Dena'ina by Peter Kalifornsky on each page.] In Walt and Elsa Pederson, eds, A Small History of the Western Kenai. Chicago: Adams Press.
- 1977. "Low Bush Cranberry Story." In Priscilla Russell Kari, Dena'ina K'et'una, Tanaina Plantlore. Anchorage: Adult Literacy Laboratory, p. 42.
- 1980.‡ Five Legends of the Dena'ina People. Told by Peter Kalifornsky, written and edited by June Lindgren Gagnon. Kenai, AK: Cook Inlet Native Association. 48 pages. [Note: four of these stories are included in A Dena'ina Legacy; the fifth story, "The Spirit of the Bear," was not written in Dena'ina by Kalifornsky.]
- 1980. "A View of the Effects of Exploration on Alaska Natives." In Antoinette Shalkop, ed., Exploration in Alaska: Captain Cook Commemorative Lecture Series. Anchorage, AK: Cook Inlet Historical Society, pp. 197–199.
- 1981.† "The Potlatch Song of the Lonely Man," modified version. In Lance Petersen, The Ballad of Kenai [play].
- 1982. Translator (English to Dena'ina), Qezdceghnen Ggagga, The Kustatan Bear Story by Maxim Chickalusion. Fairbanks, AK: Alaska Native Language Center, University of Alaska Fairbanks. 33 pages.
- 1982. [Two gambling songs.] In James Kari, ed., Ch'enlahi, the Tep-Wi Hand Game of the Dena'ina. Kenai, AK: Kenai Borough School District, pp. 18–19.
- 1983. "Unhshcheyakda: My Great-Great-Grandfather." In James Kari, Kalifornsky, The Californian from Cook Inlet. Alaska in Perspective 5(1): 8.
- 1983. "The Potlatch Song of the Lonely Man." In Richard K. Nelson, The Athabaskans: People of the Boreal Forest. Fairbanks, AK: University of Alaska Museum.
- 1985. "The Mouse Story," "The Gambling Story," "Crow and the One-Side Human," "The Old Dena'ina Beliefs." Alaska Quarterly Review 4(3–4): 173–181. [Special issue on Alaska Native Writers, Storytellers, and Orators.]
- 1990. "Two Cook Inlet Dena'ina Narratives About Russians." In Richard Pierce, ed., Russia in North America, Proceedings of the Second International Conference on Russian-America. Kingston, Ontario: The Limestone Press, pp. 36–40.

=== Unpublished works and manuscripts ===
- 1972. Notes on a 1972 Kenai potlatch. Unpublished manuscript, 4 pages.
- 1974.† Notebook #1 [writing practice]. Handwritten manuscript, 34 pages.
- 1974.† Schoolbook translations for State Operated Schools. Handwritten manuscript, 7 pages.
- 1974–1976.† Writings and lesson materials. Handwritten and typed manuscript, about 50 pages.
- 1974–1991.† Correspondence. Dena'ina and English. About 50 pages.
- 1974, 2004.† Kenai Dena'ina Key Words. Manuscript, 6 pages.
- 1980.† A trip to California and New Mexico. Handwritten manuscript, 14 pages.
- 1985–1987. Dena'ina stories in manuscript. Typescript, 56 pages. (Retyped copies of 66 published stories from 1977 and 1984; Dena'ina only, no English translations).
- 1985–1987. New stories and texts. Typescript, 46 pages. [55 items mainly in Dena'ina, without English.]

=== Posthumous Editions ===
Peter Kalifornsky and Katherine McNamara, From the First Beginning. When the Animals Were Talking / Ninya Hndadulghest: The Dena'ina Animal Stories of Peter Kalifornsky and Conversations with the Author. (Charlottesville, VA: Artist's Proof Editions, 2015). (Apple Books)

Peter Kalifornsky and Katherine McNamara, Kel Ench'q Ghe'uyi Lachq'u Niltu / From the Believing Time, When they Tested for the Truth: The Dana'ina Belief Stories of Peter Kalifornsky. (Charlottesville, VA: Artist's Proof Editions, 2019). (Apple Books)

=== Video ===
- 1984.† "Narrowing Down to One Best Path." Videotaped poetry reading by Peter Kalifornsky and Gary Snyder, Kenai Peninsula College, April 9, 1984. [Includes Snyder's comments on Peter Kalifornsky and Peter Kalifornsky reading a selection of his writings in Dena'ina and English.]

=== Interviews ===
- McNamara, Katherine. (1985).† "A Talk with Peter Kalifornsky: Sukdu Beq' Quht'ana Ch'ulani, The Stories Are for Us to Learn Something From." Alaska Quarterly Review 4(3–4): 199–208. [Special issue on Alaska Native Writers, Storytellers, and Orators.]
- McClanahan, A. J., ed. (1986).† "Peter Kalifornsky, Kalifornsky Village (an interview)." In Our Stories, Our Lives. Anchorage, AK: CIRI Foundation, pp. 23–32.

== See also ==
- Athabaskan
- Dena'ina (tribe)
- Dena'ina language
- Kalifornsky village, Alaska
