= List of places in Alaska (R) =

This list of cities, towns, unincorporated communities, counties, and other recognized places in the U.S. state of Alaska also includes information on the number and names of counties in which the place lies, and its lower and upper zip code bounds, if applicable.

Name of place	Number of counties	Principal county	Lower zip code	Upper zip code
Rainbow	1	Municipality of Anchorage		
Ralph Wien Memorial Airport	1	Northwest Arctic Borough	99752	
Rampart	1	Yukon-Koyukuk Census Area	99767	
Red Devil	1	Bethel Census Area	99656	
Red Dog Mine	1	Northwest Arctic Borough		
Refuge Cove	1	Ketchikan Gateway Borough		
Richardson	1	Fairbanks North Star Borough		
Ridgeway	1	Kenai Peninsula Borough		
Rodman	1	City and Borough of Sitka	99835	
Rogers Park	1	Municipality of Anchorage		
Rowan Bay	1	Wrangell-Petersburg Census Area		
Ruby	1	Yukon-Koyukuk Census Area	99768	
Russian Mission	1	Kusilvak Census Area	99657	
Russian Mission	1	Kusilvak Census Area		
Russian Mission-Kuskokwim	1	Bethel Census Area	99557	
