= Glackin =

Glackin is a surname. Notable people with the surname include:

- Doireann Ní Ghlacáin, Irish fiddler, sean-nós singer, and TV presenter.
- John Edward Glackin, birth name of Eddie Linden (1935–2023), Scottish-Irish poet
- Mary Glackin, American scientist
- Niall Ó Glacáin (c. 1563 – 1653), Irish physician in Italy
- Paddy Glackin (born 1954), Irish fiddler
