= Skyview Middle School =

Middle school in Alaska, United States

Location
- 46188 Sterling Hwy; Soldotna, Kenai Peninsula Borough, Alaska 99669; United States
- Coordinates: 60.457924°N 151.101075°W

Information
- School type: Public Middle school
- Established: August 2014; 11 years ago
- School district: Kenai Peninsula Borough School District
- Principal: Sarge Truesdell
- Grades: 7–8
- Enrollment: 418 (2015–16)
- Feeder to: Soldotna High School
- Website: http://skyviewmiddleschool.blogs.kpbsd.k12.ak.us/

Skyview Middle School is a public middle school serving grades 7–8 in Soldotna, Alaska, under the jurisdiction of the Kenai Peninsula Borough School District. The school's mascot is the panther, and the colors are purple and white. The school serves the student population of the central Kenai Peninsula from miles 75.5–110 of the Sterling Highway, and the communities of Soldotna, Kasilof, Sterling, and Cooper Landing. The school receives students from Soldotna, Sterling, Redoubt, Tustumena, and Kalifornsky Beach Elementary schools, as well as Soldotna Montessori School.

== History ==
Skyview Middle School was created in 2014, after the merger of Skyview High School and Soldotna High School onto Soldotna High School's campus. Skyview Middle School was then opened in the former building of Skyview High School, retaining the high school's colors, mascot, and facilities. Students attended school in the new school for the first time in fall 2014.
