= Joan M. Tenenbaum =

American academic

Joan M. Tenenbaum is an American linguist, anthropologist and artist specializing in metalsmithing and jewelry. She is also known for her documentation of the Dena’ina language as for her jewelry pieces which tell the stories of Alaska native peoples and landscape.

== Life and early influences ==
Tenenbaum discovered jewelry making at the age of 13 while in the ninth grade. She studied Romance languages and Anthropology and received her B.A. from the University of Michigan. She attended graduate school in Anthropology and Linguistics and received her Ph.D. from Columbia University. Research for her dissertation took her to Nondalton, a small village in rural Alaska where she lived for two years in order to document the Dena’ina language. In the succeeding two years she wrote a grammar of the Dena’ina verb for her dissertation, Morphology and Semantics of the Tanaina Verb, and compiled a preliminary dictionary of the endangered language. She also translated and compiled 24 stories which she had recorded and transcribed in Nondalton, for her book Dena’ina Sukdu’a: Traditional Stories of the Tanaina Athabaskans, first published in 1976. Both the dissertation and the collection of Dena’ina stories are still regarded by linguists today as among the finest in the field.

After completing her Ph.D. Tenenbaum lived with Yup’ik and Iñupiat peoples in several other Alaskan villages, teaching and coordinating rural delivery programs for the University of Alaska, among them the X-CED Program. During all these years, she continued to make jewelry and never gave up her dream to one day be a full-time artist.

In 1982 Tenenbaum changed directions and began to devote herself to her jewelry making career, studying with a personal mentor, and pursuing classes, challenging herself to master the most difficult techniques. In time, the life-changing experiences of being welcomed and loved by Alaskan village communities began to surface in her jewelry work. Additionally, she has continued to go back to Alaska and visit the peoples she lived with. What has resulted is a synthesis of an Anthropologist's perspective with a lifelong dedication to the art of jewelry making.

Over the years, as her understanding of these cultures and the landscape they inhabit deepened and her technical goldsmithing vocabulary expanded, Tenenbaum's jewelry work has become more complex. Her work is entirely hand fabricated using precious metals, gemstones, cloisonné enameling, and a wide range of metalsmithing and goldsmithing techniques. Her pieces tell stories and paint pictures of the peoples with whom she lived, of how we interact with our environment, and of places of transcendent beauty. These pieces are wearable miniature landscapes having both cultural themes and ecological messages.

== Works ==
=== Linguistic publications ===
- Tenenbaum, Joan M. (July 20, 1973). "Seeking Lost Alaskan Language". The Cleveland Jewish News.
- Tenenbaum, Joan M. (1976). Dena'ina Sukdu'a: Traditional Stories of the Tanaina Athabaskans. Alaska Native Language Center. Republished in 1984 and 2006.
- Tenenbaum, Joan Marsha (1978). Morphology and Semantics of the Tanaina Verb (PhD). Columbia University.
- Tenenbaum, Joan M. (2013). "Dach' hdi łu t'qidyuq......and that's the way it happened: The Tradition of Dena'ina Storytelling". Dena'inaq' Huch'ulyeshi: The Dena'ina Way of Life. Anchorage Museum at Rasmuson Center Exhibition Catalog.
