= Homer High School (Alaska) =

Coordinates: 59.64863°N 151.53013°W

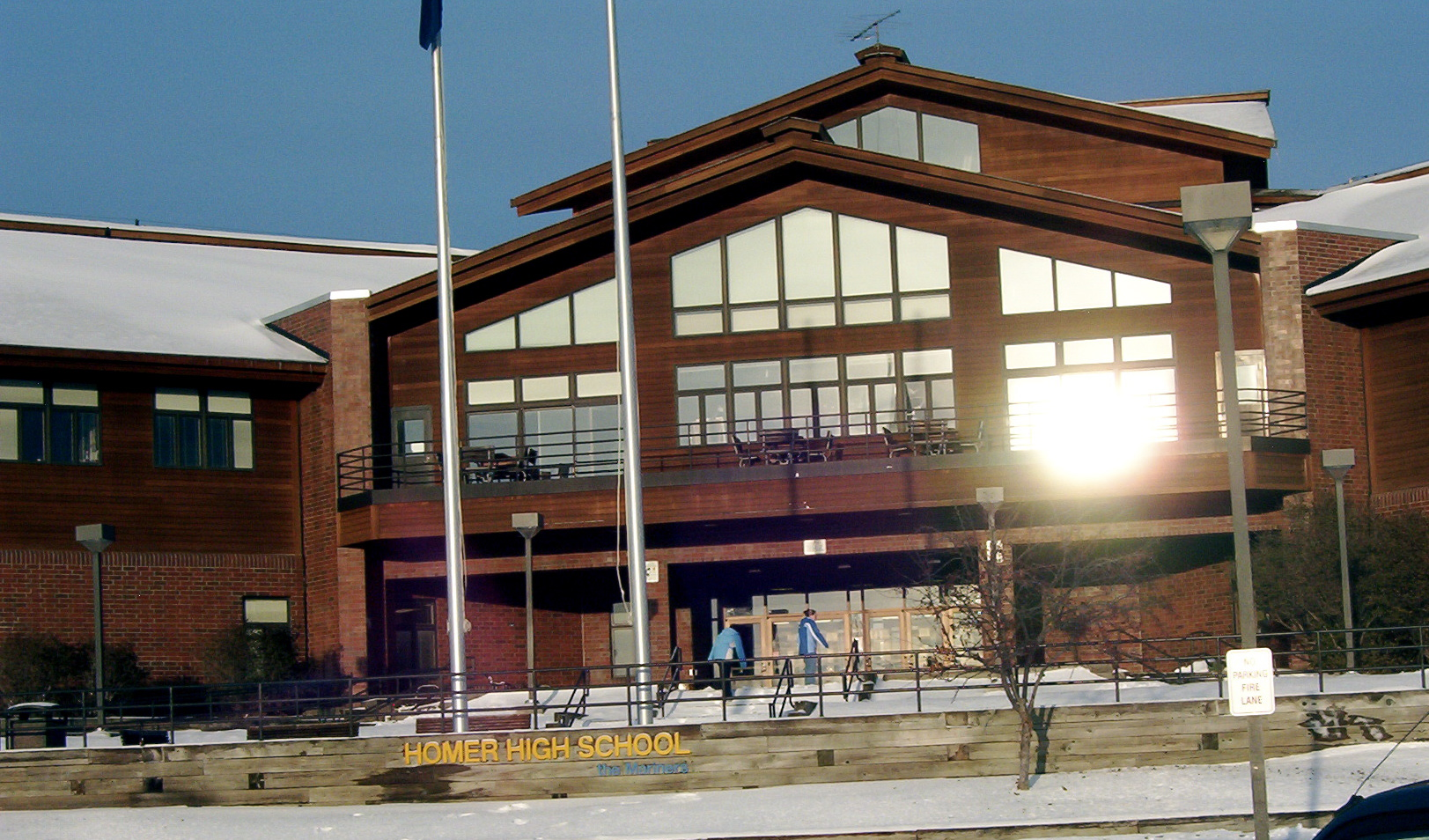

Location
- 600 E Fairview Ave; Homer, Alaska 99603; United States

Information
- Type: Public
- School district: Kenai Peninsula Borough School District
- CEEB code: 020045
- Principal: Eric Pederson
- Faculty: 19.0 (FTE) (2024-2025)
- Grades: 9-12
- Enrollment: 357 (2024-2025)
- Student to teacher ratio: 18.69 (2024-2025)
- Colors: Blue and gold
- Athletics: Boys soccer, girls soccer, softball, baseball, track & field, football, XC running, volleyball, Nordic ski, hockey, wrestling, boys basketball, girls basketball, swim and dive, booster club
- Mascot: Mariners
- Website: kpbsd.org/schools/homer-high/

Homer High School is located in Homer, Alaska. It is part of the Kenai Peninsula Borough School District. The school's mascot is a mariner, usually represented by a ship's wheel.

== History ==
The current Homer High School opened in fall 1985. The building includes a commons (a central gathering place used as a cafeteria), pool, auditorium, band and choir rooms, and mechanical and wood shops.

Homer was growing quickly at the time, so the high school was designed for a capacity of 800 students. Schematic designs of the high school were approved in January 1983, but because the planned school exceeded the state's size limit for 90 percent reimbursement of construction costs, additional funding was needed to build the pool and 500-seat auditorium. The district planned to seek a state appropriation. Funding instead came from a bond issue passed by voters in October 1983, which covered $4.79 million in costs not covered by the state. Alaska governor Bill Sheffield attended the school's opening day and had a hot lunch from the cafeteria.

The previous high schools were built in 1957 and 1971.

=== Sperm whale skeleton ===
There is a 41-foot sperm whale skeleton displayed in the commons of Homer High School. The skeleton was collected from East Chugach Island in 1988.

== Notable alumni ==
- Stephanie Herring, climate scientist at NOAA
