= Ridgeway, Alaska =

- Census-designated place
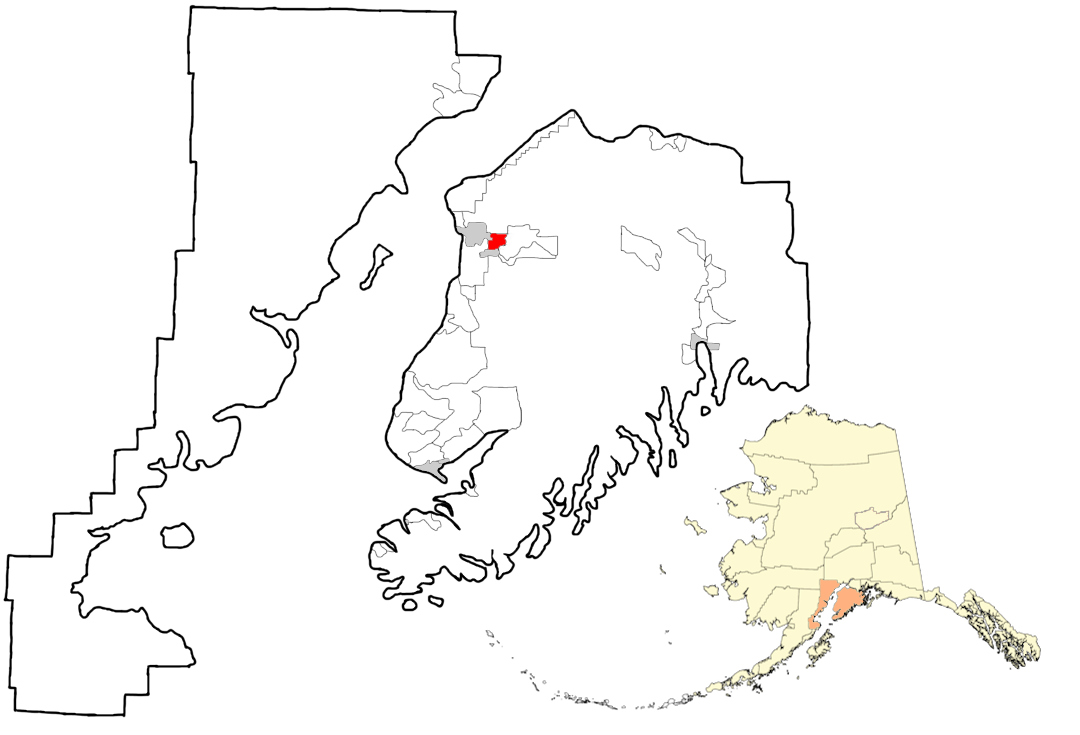
- Location in Kenai Peninsula Borough, Alaska
- Coordinates: 60°31′11″N 151°3′39″W
- Country: United States
- State: Alaska
- Borough: Kenai Peninsula

Government
  - Borough mayor: Peter Micciche
  - State senator: Jesse Bjorkman (R)
  - State reps.: Ben Carpenter (R); Justin Ruffridge (R)

Area
  - Total: 17.68 sq mi (45.80 km^{2})
  - Land: 16.79 sq mi (43.48 km^{2})
  - Water: 0.90 sq mi (2.32 km^{2})
- Elevation: 187 ft (57 m)

Population (2020)
  - Total: 2,136
  - Density: 127.2/sq mi (49.13/km^{2})
- Time zone: UTC-9 (Alaska (AKST))
  - Summer (DST): UTC-8 (AKDT)
- Area code: 907
- FIPS code: 02-65345
- GNIS feature ID: 1866972

Ridgeway is a census-designated place (CDP) in Kenai Peninsula Borough, Alaska, United States. At the 2020 census the population was 2,136, up from 2,022 in 2010.

== Geography ==
Ridgeway is located on the western side of the Kenai Peninsula at 60°31′11″N 151°3′39″W (60.519682, -151.060911). It is bordered to the northwest by the city of Kenai and to the south by the city of Soldotna, the borough seat. It is bordered to the east, across Soldotna Creek, by the unincorporated Sterling CDP, and to the west, across the Kenai River, by the Kalifornsky CDP.

According to the United States Census Bureau, the Ridgeway CDP has a total area of 17.7 square miles (45.8 km^{2}), of which 16.8 square miles (43.5 km^{2}) are land and 0.89 square miles (2.3 km^{2}), or 5.13%, are water.

== Demographics ==
Historical population
Census	Pop.	Note	%±
1990	2,018		—
2000	1,932		−4.3%
2010	2,022		4.7%
2020	2,136		5.6%

Ridgeway first appeared on the 1990 U.S. Census as a census-designated place (CDP).

=== 2020 census ===
As of the 2020 census, Ridgeway had a population of 2,136. The median age was 42.7 years. 23.9% of residents were under the age of 18 and 19.7% of residents were 65 years of age or older. For every 100 females there were 108.8 males, and for every 100 females age 18 and over there were 108.3 males age 18 and over.

23.6% of residents lived in urban areas, while 76.4% lived in rural areas.

There were 851 households in Ridgeway, of which 28.9% had children under the age of 18 living in them. Of all households, 54.2% were married-couple households, 21.6% were households with a male householder and no spouse or partner present, and 17.3% were households with a female householder and no spouse or partner present. About 26.0% of all households were made up of individuals and 12.7% had someone living alone who was 65 years of age or older.

There were 1,094 housing units, of which 22.2% were vacant. The homeowner vacancy rate was 1.7% and the rental vacancy rate was 9.9%.

Racial composition as of the 2020 census
Race	Number	Percent
White	1,738	81.4%
Black or African American	15	0.7%
American Indian and Alaska Native	116	5.4%
Asian	24	1.1%
Native Hawaiian and Other Pacific Islander	1	0.0%
Some other race	32	1.5%
Two or more races	210	9.8%
Hispanic or Latino (of any race)	104	4.9%

=== 2000 census ===
As of the census of 2000, there were 1,932 people, 715 households, and 536 families residing in the CDP. The population density was 116.0 inhabitants per square mile (44.8/km^{2}). There were 938 housing units at an average density of 56.3 per square mile (21.7/km^{2}). The racial makeup of the CDP was 87.8% White, 0.4% Black or African American, 4.3% Native American, 0.8% Asian, 0.1% Pacific Islander, 1.6% from other races, and 5.1% from two or more races. 2.5% of the population were Hispanic or Latino of any race.

There were 715 households, out of which 39.3% had children under the age of 18 living with them, 62.5% were married couples living together, 9.5% had a female householder with no husband present, and 24.9% were non-families. 18.9% of all households were made up of individuals, and 4.2% had someone living alone who was 65 years of age or older. The average household size was 2.70 and the average family size was 3.09.

In the CDP, the population was spread out, with 29.5% under the age of 18, 6.7% from 18 to 24, 26.5% from 25 to 44, 31.0% from 45 to 64, and 6.4% who were 65 years of age or older. The median age was 38 years. For every 100 females, there were 98.6 males. For every 100 females age 18 and over, there were 99.3 males.

The median income for a household in the CDP was $50,625, and the median income for a family was $56,985. Males had a median income of $51,488 versus $36,786 for females. The per capita income for the CDP was $23,225. About 7.4% of families and 9.4% of the population were below the poverty line, including 11.6% of those under age 18 and 15.5% of those age 65 or over.
