= Katherine McNamara (publisher) =

American publisher

Katherine McNamara is a writer, editor, and digital publisher in Charlottesville, Virginia. She grew up in Northeastern Pennsylvania. While pursuing a Ph.D. in History at Cornell, she went to Paris on a French-government research fellowship, researching the thought of the French ethnologue Marcel Mauss. From Paris she moved to Alaska, where she lived and wrote for many years; she developed an interest in Native languages and linguistics that continues to this day. She moved to New York in the late 1980s, and in 1989 began writing her 2001 book, Narrow Road to the Deep North: A Journey into the Interior of Alaska. After her husband's death in 1994, she moved to Charlottesville, and soon after began her digital publication Archipelago. Today she is publisher and editor of Artist's Proof Editions.

== Publishing and editing Archipelago ==
McNamara is publisher and editor of one of the earliest online literary magazines, Archipelago, which ran from 1997-2007. By its eighth year, the quarterly magazine reached 10,000-13,000 unique readers per month. Early reviews of the magazine noted its unusually elegant design compared with other web publications in the early years of digital publication, as well as users' option to download issues in PDF form. The magazine included poetry, prose, criticism, photography translation, and recorded sound. Endnotes, and in such series as "Living with Guns," McNamara wrote about war and violence, often from Washington, and spoke out about how Bush-Cheyney manufactured a premise for taking the nation into a war of choice. She wrote editorials against the Bush-Cheyney war when opposition was only beginning to form in DC. She began the series "Living with Guns" and published excerpts of James L. Hicks's reports of the lynching of Emmett Till. Contributing editors included writers such as John Casey, Benjamin Cheever, Edith Grossman, and Larry Woiwode. Some of the international range of contributors to Archipelago include Etel Adnan, Hubert Butler, Joel Agee, Sarah Arvio, Attlio Bertolucci, Jared Carter, Theo Dorgan, George Garrett, John Haines, Norman Lock, Frank McGuinness, Samuel Menashe, Greil Marcus, and Abdón Ubidia.

McNamara was prompted to experiment with the web as a publishing venue in part because of what she witnessed happening in print publishing in the early 1990s: her husband, Leo Goerner, was an editor at Knopf and editor and publisher at Atheneum, and McNamara saw through his work how limited the range of published writers was. Archipelago not only published in response to this condition, but included interviews with publishing insiders about the business of books. This series, termed "Institutional Memory," ran for five years and had as a particular concern the impact of conglomeration on literary publishing. Interviewees included the British publisher Marion Boyars, publisher at John Calder and then Marian Boyars Publishing; Michael Bessie, co-founder of Atheneum, and editor Cornelia Bessie, who together ran Bessie Books imprint; William Strachan, director of Columbia University Press; the Parisian English-language bookseller Odile Hellier; journalist Calvin Reid of Publishers Weekly; Altie Karper, managing editor of Schocken and Pantheon; and Susan Ralston, editorial director at Schocken and senior editor at Knopf and Arthur Samuelson, former editorial director of Schocken Books.

From 2017-2018, a physical exhibition on the history of Archipelago, curated by McNamara, was mounted by Rare Book School in the Rotunda at the University of Virginia. In 2017-18, her literary digital archives were the subject of an exhibition sponsored by Rare Book School, "An Archipelago of Readers: Forming a Literary Community in Digital Media," on exhibition in The Rotunda, University of Virginia.

== Publishing and editing Artist's Proof Editions ==
In 2012 McNamara created the small-press imprint Artist's Proof Editions, which "builds digital books and book-like projections for the iPad, and publishes works on paper, including artists’ books and broadsides." Archipelago’s presentation of The Great Book of Gaelic / An Leabhar Mòr, now the only remaining web presence of that multi-media unbound book, showed her how a multi-media, multi-language book might be presented digitally.

Artist's Proof has published the following works:

- Bin Danh and Robert Schultz, Ancestral Altars. (Apple Books)
- Ben Jasnow and George Woodman, Georgic Fantasy. (Apple Books) ISBN 978-0-9854927-6-2
- Peter Kalifornsky and Katherine McNamara, From the First Beginning. When the Animals Were Talking / Ninya Hndadulghest: The Dena'ina Animal Stories of Peter Kalifornsky and Conversations with the Author. 2015. (Apple Books)
- Peter Kalifornsky and Katherine McNamara, Kel Ench'q Ghe'uyi Lachq'u Niltu / From the Believing Time, When they Tested for the Truth: The Dana'ina Belief Stories of Peter Kalifornsky. 2019. (Apple Books)
- Lyndia Terre, I went into the Large Space. (Apple Books)
- Katherine Vaz and Isabel Pavão, The Heart is a Drowning Object. 2019. (Apple Books)
- Mary-Sherman Willis and Colin Willis, Caveboy: A Poem. 2012. (Apple Books ISBN 978-0-9854927-1-7)
- Inna Kabysh and Katherine E. Young (translator). Two Poems. (Apple Books)

== Writing and scholarship ==
McNamara's book, a work of nonfiction, Narrow Road to the Deep North: A Journey into the Interior of Alaska (Mercury House, 2001), is about her years living and working as a teacher in a native Athabaskan community in a remote area of Alaska. The review in Publishers Weekly termed it “A finely wrought, layered story ... rich with affectionate, precise profiles of native people and white outsiders.... Whether writing about intimate relationships, poetry, or the intricacies of village life, her approach is full of grace and equanimity.” McNamara's conversations with linguist Peter Kalifornsky had a profound impact on her and led to her ongoing Kalifornsky Project, with Artist's Proof Editions.
