= Chris Mabeus =

American baseball player (born 1979)

- Pitcher
- Born: February 11, 1979 (age 46); Peoria, Illinois, U.S.
- Batted: Right Threw: Right

MLB debut
- May 29, 2006, for the Milwaukee Brewers

Last MLB appearance
- May 29, 2006, for the Milwaukee Brewers

MLB statistics
- Win–loss record: 0–0
- Earned run average: 21.60
- Strikeouts: 2
- Stats at Baseball Reference

Teams
- Milwaukee Brewers (2006)

Christopher Eugene Mabeus (born February 11, 1979) is an American former Major League Baseball pitcher. He played one game at the major league level for the Milwaukee Brewers.

He grew up in Soldotna, Alaska and attended Soldotna High School where he played baseball and water polo. He told reporters he was recruited by more colleges to play water polo than college baseball. He played college baseball at Eastern Arizona College in Thatcher, Arizona and Lewis-Clark State College in Lewiston, Idaho.

Mabeus was drafted by the Oakland Athletics in the 13th round of the 2001 amateur draft. He played his first professional season with their Class A Vancouver Canadians in 2001, and split his last season between their Triple-A club, the Sacramento River Cats, the Brewers, and their Double-A (Huntsville Stars) and Triple-A (Nashville Sounds) clubs in 2006.
