= Dieter Söll =

Dieter G. Söll
- Born: 1935 (age 90–91)
- Education: University of Stuttgart; University of Wisconsin–Madison
- Known for: tRNA
- Scientific career
- Fields: Biochemistry
- Workplaces: Yale University

Dieter Gerhard Söll (born 1935) is a Sterling Professor of Molecular Biophysics and Biochemistry and Chemistry at the Yale University. He earned his B.S. and Ph.D. from Stuttgart University in 1962 and did his postdoctoral work at University of Wisconsin–Madison from 1962-1965 with Har Gobind Khorana. He was briefly an assistant professor at University of Wisconsin before joining the Yale faculty in 1967 and has been there since. He was named a Sterling Professor in 2006. As a postdoc with Jack Strominger, he identified tRNAs that were involved in peptidoglycan formation leading to the discovery of novel aminoacyl-tRNA functions. He later sequenced the selenocysteine tRNA. His research is centered on the formation of aminoacyl-tRNA and tRNA synthetases. He is a member of the National Academy of Sciences, fellow of the American Academy of Arts and Sciences, and was named a Guggenheim Fellow in 1972 and 1989 and a Humboldt Fellow in 2000. In addition to his academic work, he has been recognized as a leader in creating research opportunities for minority students notably by spearheading a program to bring students from Tougaloo College to Yale University for summer research in the early 1970s.
