= Kalifornsky, Alaska =

Kalifornsky, Alaska Unhghenesditnu
- Census-designated place
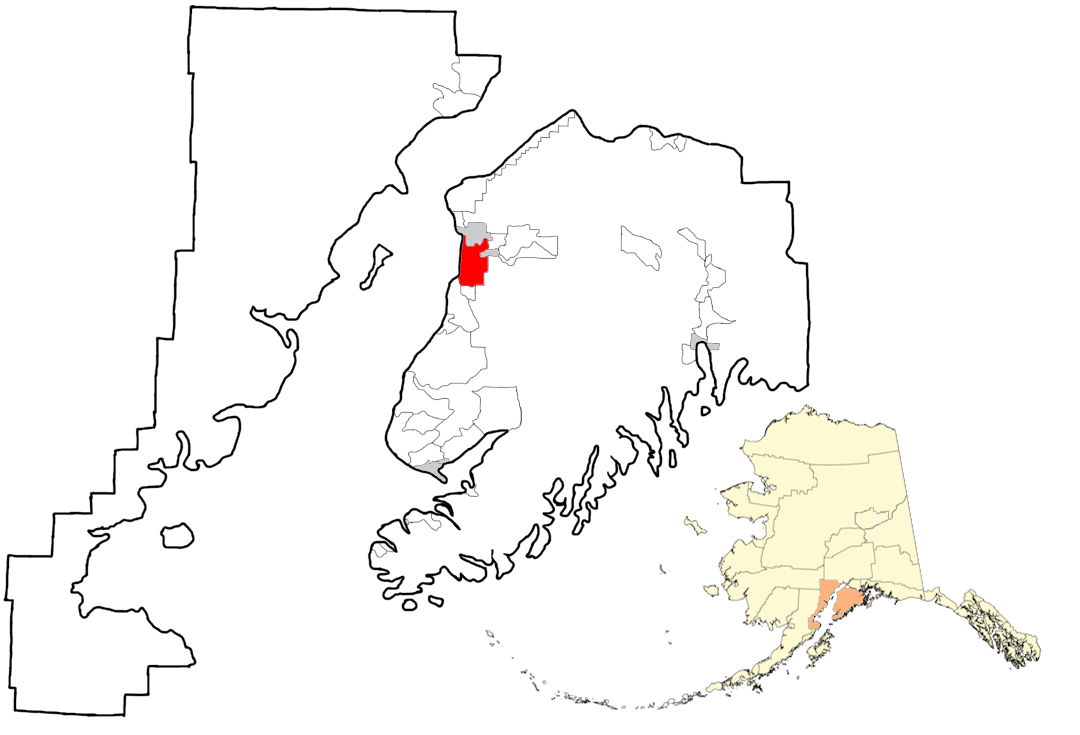
- Location in Kenai Peninsula Borough, Alaska
- Coordinates: 60°28′24″N 151°12′5″W
- Country: United States
- State: Alaska
- Borough: Kenai Peninsula

Government
  - Borough mayor: Peter Micciche
  - State senators: Jesse Bjorkman (R); Gary Stevens (R)
  - State reps.: Ben Carpenter (R); Justin Ruffridge (R); Sarah Vance (R)

Area
  - Total: 69.74 sq mi (180.63 km^{2})
  - Land: 68.72 sq mi (177.99 km^{2})
  - Water: 1.02 sq mi (2.64 km^{2})
- Elevation: 23 ft (7 m)

Population (2020)
  - Total: 8,487
  - Density: 123.5/sq mi (47.68/km^{2})
- Time zone: UTC-9 (AKST)
  - Summer (DST): UTC-8 (AKDT)
- ZIP Codes: 99610 (Kasilof); 99611 (Kenai); 99669 (Soldotna)
- Area code: 907
- FIPS code: 02-37250
- GNIS feature ID: 1413260

Kalifornsky (Denaʼina: Unhghenesditnu) is a census-designated place (CDP) in Kenai Peninsula Borough, Alaska, United States. The population was 8,487 at the 2020 census, up from 7,850 in 2010. It is the most populated locality in the borough.

== Location ==
Kalifornsky is located at 60°28′24″N 151°12′5″W (60.473421, -151.201427). It is bordered to the north by the city of Kenai and to the east by the city of Soldotna, the borough seat. The Kenai River forms part of the northeast border of the CDP, across which is the CDP of Ridgeway. It is bordered to the south by the CDPs of Cohoe and Kasilof.

According to the United States Census Bureau, the CDP has a total area of 69.8 square miles (180.7 km^{2}), of which 68.9 square miles (178.4 km^{2}) are land and 0.89 square miles (2.3 km^{2}), or 1.27%, are water.

Kalifornsky is on the eastern shore of Cook Inlet on the Kenai Peninsula. It lies off the Sterling Highway along Kalifornsky Beach Road, 4 to 17 miles (6 to 27 km) south of the center of Kenai and 4 to 16 miles (6 to 26 km) west of the center of Soldotna.

== Climate ==
Kalifornsky CDP has relatively mild winter temperatures, ranging from 14 to 27 °F (−10 to −3 °C). Summer temperatures are relatively cool, ranging from 45 to 65 °F (7 to 18 °C). Average annual precipitation is 24 inches (610 mm).

== History and culture ==
The Dena'ina name for Kalifornsky is Unhghenesditnu, meaning 'farthest creek over'.

The place name "Kalifonsky" (omitting the letter "r") was noted in 1916 by the United States Coast and Geodetic Survey, with its etymology attributed to an Indian word kali meaning "fishermen".

However, this place name appears to have been due to a mistaken transcription of the village name "Kalifornsky", which took its name from the surname of the village's founder, a Dena'ina Indian named Qadanalchen (meaning "acts quickly" in the Outer Inlet dialect of the Dena'ina language). Qadanalchen had worked at the Russian American colony of Fort Ross in California from about 1812 to about 1821. On his return to Alaska, Qadanalchen took the name "Kalifornsky", the Russian equivalent of "Californian".

Qadanalchen's great-great-grandson, the self-taught Dena'ina writer and ethnographer Peter Kalifornsky (1911–1993), was born in Kalifornsky village, which lay about 10 miles (16 km) south of Kenai and 4 miles (6 km) north of the mouth of the Kasilof River.

== Demographics ==
Historical population
Census	Pop.	Note	%±
1980	92		—
1990	285		209.8%
2000	5,846		1,951.2%
2010	7,850		34.3%
2020	8,487		8.1%
U.S. Decennial Census

Kalifornsky first appeared without an "r" in the 1980 United States census as Kalifonsky, a census-designated place (CDP). The name was corrected to "Kalifornsky" with the 2000 U.S. Census.

=== 2020 census ===
As of the 2020 census, Kalifornsky had a population of 8,487. The median age was 40.0 years. 23.2% of residents were under the age of 18 and 15.7% were 65 years of age or older. For every 100 females, there were 104.2 males, and for every 100 females age 18 and over, there were 104.0 males.

39.9% of residents lived in urban areas, while 60.1% lived in rural areas.

There were 3,303 households in Kalifornsky, of which 29.1% had children under the age of 18 living in them. Of all households, 54.2% were married-couple households, 19.7% were households with a male householder and no spouse or partner present, and 18.6% were households with a female householder and no spouse or partner present. About 25.1% of all households were made up of individuals and 9.0% had someone living alone who was 65 years of age or older.

There were 4,041 housing units, of which 18.3% were vacant. The homeowner vacancy rate was 1.1% and the rental vacancy rate was 11.6%.

Racial composition as of the 2020 census
Race	Number	Percent
White	6,767	79.7%
Black or African American	32	0.4%
American Indian and Alaska Native	589	6.9%
Asian	117	1.4%
Native Hawaiian and Other Pacific Islander	14	0.2%
Some other race	135	1.6%
Two or more races	833	9.8%
Hispanic or Latino (of any race)	353	4.2%

=== 2000 census ===
As of the census of 2000, there were 5,846 people residing in the CDP. The population density was 84.5 inhabitants per square mile (32.6/km^{2}). There were 2,479 housing units at an average density of 35.8 per square mile (13.8/km^{2}). The racial makeup of the CDP was 89.8% White, 0.2% Black or African American, 4.6% Native American, 0.7% Asian, 0.1% Pacific Islander, 0.6% from other races, and 4.1% from two or more races. 2.0% of the population were Hispanic or Latino of any race.

There were 2,117 households and 1,596 families, out of which 42.0% had children under the age of 18 living with them, 62.3% were married couples living together, 8.0% had a female householder with no husband present, and 24.6% were non-families. 19.4% of all households were made up of individuals, and 2.5% had someone living alone who was 65 years of age or older. The average household size was 2.74 and the average family size was 3.13.

In the CDP, the population was spread out, with 31.3% under the age of 18, 6.1% from 18 to 24, 31.5% from 25 to 44, 25.6% from 45 to 64, and 5.4% who were 65 years of age or older. The median age was 35 years. For every 100 females, there were 107.5 males. For every 100 females age 18 and over, there were 107.1 males.

The median income for a household in the CDP was $54,864, and the median income for a family was $58,750. Males had a median income of $50,583 versus $30,493 for females. The per capita income for the CDP was $23,898. About 6.6% of families and 7.9% of the population were below the poverty line, including 9.2% of those under age 18 and none of those age 65 or over.

== Economy and transportation ==
The area's economy is diverse. Industries and services providing employment include oil and gas processing, timber, commercial and sport fishing, government, retail businesses, and tourism.

Kalifornsky Beach Road is frequently trafficked by Kenai River sports fishermen. The nearby Sterling Highway, a component of Alaska Route 1, provides access to the state road system. The nearby city of Kenai has an airport and boating facilities.
