= Soldotna, Alaska =

City in Alaska, United States

- City
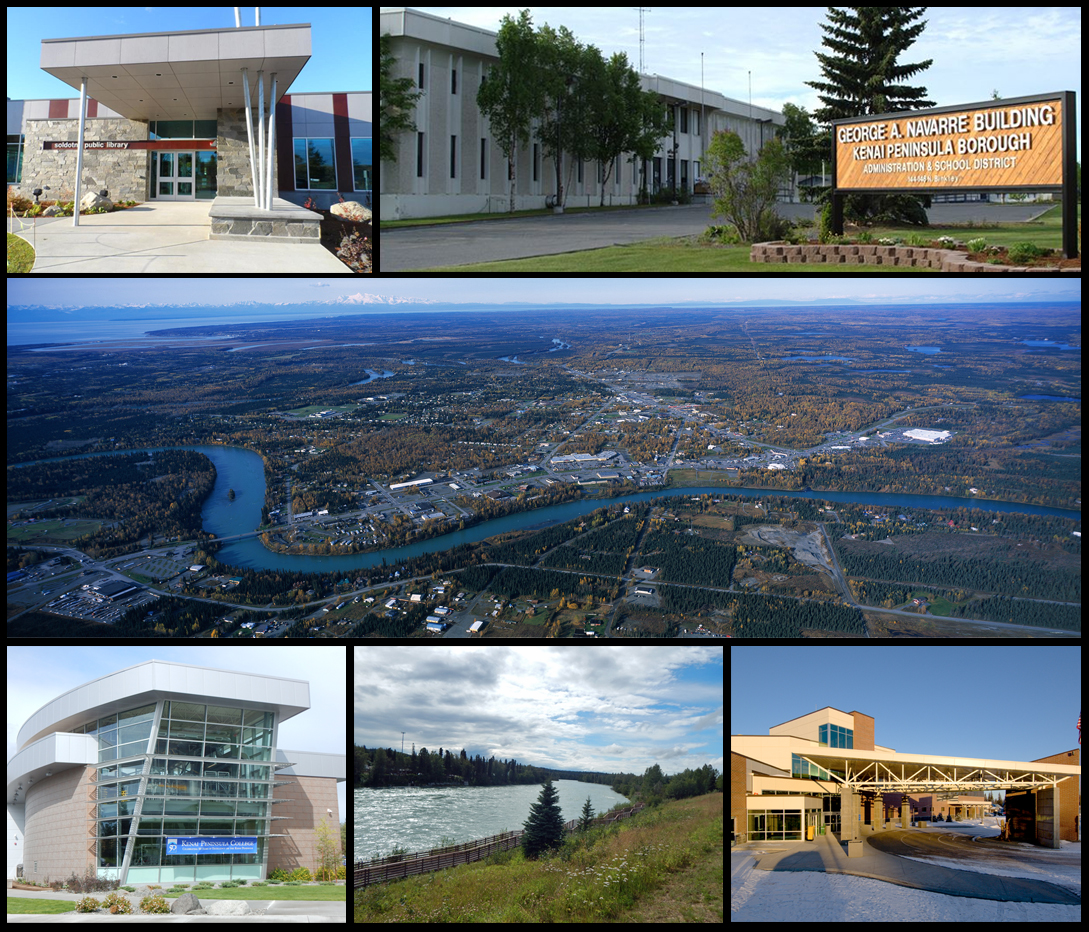
- From top left: Joyce K. Carver Memorial Library, Kenai Peninsula Borough Building, aerial view of the City of Soldotna, Central Peninsula Hospital, Soldotna Creek Park, and the Kenai Peninsula College.

- Logo

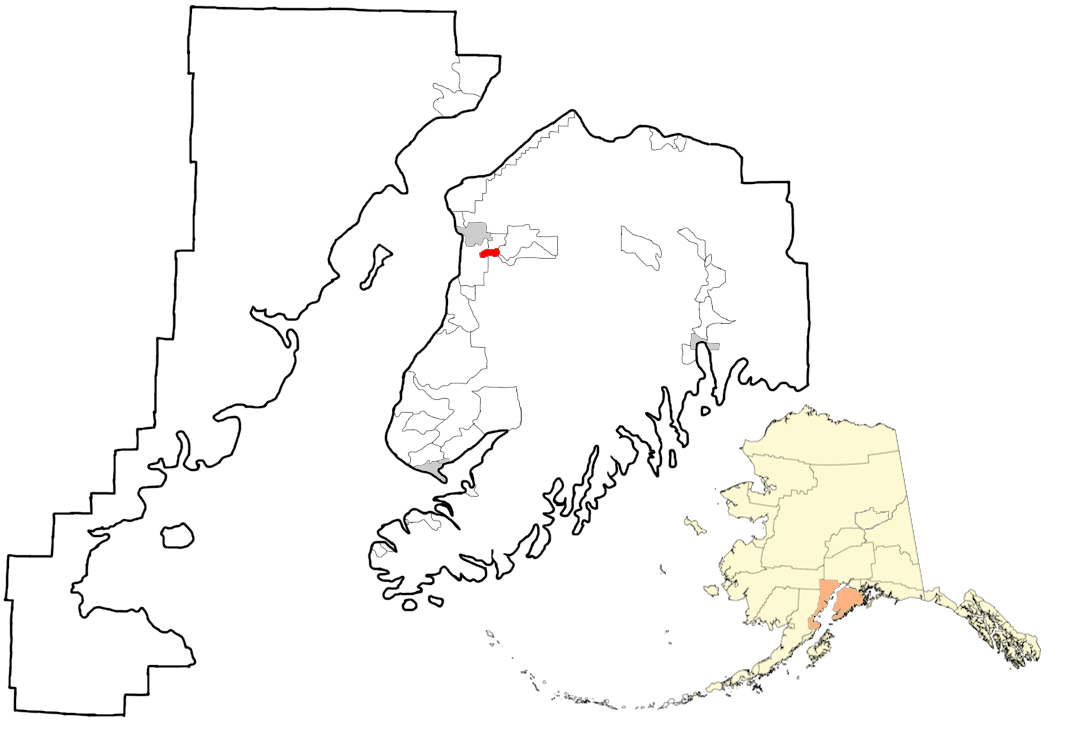
- Location in Kenai Peninsula Borough, Alaska
- Coordinates: 60°29′3″N 151°3′54″W
- Country: United States
- State: Alaska
- Borough: Kenai Peninsula
- Incorporated: July 1967

Government
  - Mayor: Paul Whitney
  - State senator: Jesse Bjorkman (R)
  - State rep.: Justin Ruffridge (R)

Area
  - Total: 7.41 sq mi (19.19 km^{2})
  - Land: 6.95 sq mi (18.01 km^{2})
  - Water: 0.46 sq mi (1.18 km^{2})
- Elevation: 105 ft (32 m)

Population (2020)
  - Total: 4,342
  - Density: 624.3/sq mi (241.05/km^{2})
- Time zone: UTC−9 (Alaska (AKST))
  - Summer (DST): UTC−8 (AKDT)
- ZIP code: 99669
- Area code: 907 (local exchange prefix: 260, 262)
- FIPS code: 02-71640
- Website: www.soldotna.org

Soldotna is a city in the Kenai Peninsula Borough in the U.S. state of Alaska. At the 2020 census, the population was 4,342, up from 4,163 in 2010. It is the seat of the Kenai Peninsula Borough.

Soldotna is located in the Southcentral portion of Alaska on the central-western portion of the Kenai Peninsula. The city limits span 7 square miles along the Kenai River, which empties into the Cook Inlet in the nearby city of Kenai. Soldotna is located on the western edge of the vast Kenai National Wildlife Refuge, a protected area spanning nearly 2 million acres and home to bears, moose, caribou, sheep, and many fish and bird species.

The city is located at the junction of the Sterling Highway and the Kenai Spur Highway, which has enabled Soldotna to develop as a service and retail hub for the Central Peninsula as well as for travelers between Anchorage and Homer. The Central Peninsula Hospital serves the medical needs of the region's residents and tourists. The Kenai Peninsula College, a branch of the University of Alaska Anchorage, operates the Kenai River Campus in Soldotna. Additionally, the headquarters of the Kenai National Wildlife Refuge, the Kenai Peninsula Borough, and the Kenai Peninsula Borough School District are located in the city.

== History ==
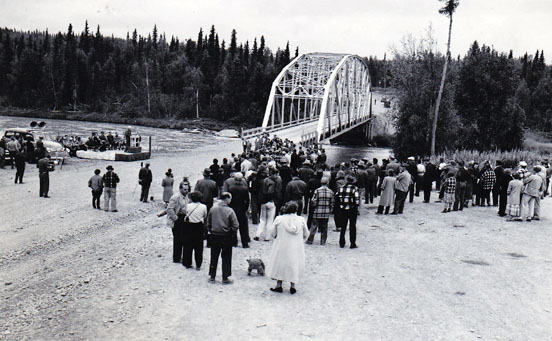
Dedication ceremony for the Sterling Highway on September 6, 1950, at the original bridge crossing the Kenai River. The highway's opening provided for large-scale settlement of the area.

In 1947, after World War II, the United States government withdrew a number of townships along Cook Inlet and the lower Kenai River from the Kenai National Moose Range, opening up the area to settlement under the Homestead Act. Veterans of the United States armed services were given a 90-day preference over non-veterans in selecting land and filing for property. Also in that year, the Sterling Highway right-of-way was cleared of trees from Cooper Landing to Kenai. The location of present-day Soldotna was selected as the site for the highway's bridge crossing the Kenai River.

The construction of the Sterling Highway provided a link from the Soldotna area to the outside world. More homesteads were taken and visitors came to fish in the area. The Soldotna Post Office opened in 1949 and other businesses opened in the next few years.

Oil was discovered in the Swanson River region in 1957, bringing new economic development to the area. In 1960, Soldotna was incorporated as a fourth class city with a population of 332 and an area of 7.4 square miles (4,700 acres). Then seven years later, in 1967, Soldotna was recognized as a first class city.

In 1964, the Kenai Peninsula College, the Kenai Peninsula Borough government, and the Kenai Peninsula Borough School District were formed.

The city experienced rapid population growth in the 1960s through the 1990s as a result of its location at the intersection of two major highways and due to development of the oil industry on the Kenai Peninsula. As the city and the oil industry have matured, population growth has somewhat slowed, although the city experienced more growth from 2000 to 2010 than during the previous decade. In 2016, it was granted home rule.

== Geography ==
Soldotna is located on the banks of the Kenai River on the Kenai Peninsula of Alaska. It is named after nearby Soldotna Creek. There are multiple theories explaining the origin of the word "Soldotna"; these include the variant "Soldatna", which was the prevalent spelling of the community's name during the 1950s and 1960s.

According to the United States Census Bureau, the city has a total area of 7.4 square miles (19 km^{2}), of which 6.9 square miles (18 km^{2}) of it is land and 0.5 square miles (1.3 km^{2}) of it (6.34%) is water.

=== Climate ===
As with much of Southcentral Alaska, Soldotna has a moderate dry-summer subarctic climate (Köppen climate classification: Dsc) due to the cool summers, though the diurnal temperature variation is larger than most locations in the region. Winters are snowy, long but not particularly cold, especially considering the latitude, with January featuring a daily average temperature of 13.4 °F (−10.3 °C). There are 46 nights of sub-0 °F (−18 °C) lows annually, and the area lies in USDA Plant Hardiness Zone 4, indicating an average annual minimum in the −20 to −30 °F (−29 to −34 °C) range. Summers are cool due to the marine influence, with 12 days of 70 °F (21 °C)+ highs annually.

Climate data for Soldotna 5SSW, Alaska, 1991-2020 normals, 2004-2023 extremes: 180 ft (55 m)
Month	Jan	Feb	Mar	Apr	May	Jun	Jul	Aug	Sep	Oct	Nov	Dec	Year
Record high °F (°C)	50 (10)	46 (8)	62 (17)	71 (22)	77 (25)	86 (30)	87 (31)	84 (29)	69 (21)	60 (16)	49 (9)	44 (7)	87 (31)
Mean maximum °F (°C)	39.2 (4.0)	40.7 (4.8)	45.5 (7.5)	57.3 (14.1)	70.3 (21.3)	73.3 (22.9)	76.1 (24.5)	72.6 (22.6)	64.2 (17.9)	54.3 (12.4)	40.6 (4.8)	38.7 (3.7)	78.1 (25.6)
Mean daily maximum °F (°C)	21.2 (−6.0)	28.3 (−2.1)	34.6 (1.4)	45.9 (7.7)	56.1 (13.4)	62.3 (16.8)	65.5 (18.6)	63.7 (17.6)	55.2 (12.9)	42.4 (5.8)	28.1 (−2.2)	23.3 (−4.8)	43.9 (6.6)
Daily mean °F (°C)	13.0 (−10.6)	18.8 (−7.3)	23.1 (−4.9)	35.2 (1.8)	44.2 (6.8)	51.3 (10.7)	55.3 (12.9)	53.2 (11.8)	45.9 (7.7)	34.0 (1.1)	20.1 (−6.6)	15.7 (−9.1)	34.2 (1.2)
Mean daily minimum °F (°C)	4.8 (−15.1)	9.4 (−12.6)	11.5 (−11.4)	24.4 (−4.2)	32.3 (0.2)	40.3 (4.6)	45.0 (7.2)	42.6 (5.9)	36.6 (2.6)	25.5 (−3.6)	12.0 (−11.1)	8.1 (−13.3)	24.4 (−4.2)
Mean minimum °F (°C)	−20.7 (−29.3)	−16.2 (−26.8)	−13.9 (−25.5)	7.8 (−13.4)	23.0 (−5.0)	29.3 (−1.5)	34.0 (1.1)	30.3 (−0.9)	21.7 (−5.7)	7.7 (−13.5)	−12.7 (−24.8)	−16.9 (−27.2)	−25.5 (−31.9)
Record low °F (°C)	−34 (−37)	−31 (−35)	−28 (−33)	−7 (−22)	19 (−7)	26 (−3)	29 (−2)	27 (−3)	14 (−10)	−4 (−20)	−22 (−30)	−38 (−39)	−38 (−39)
Average precipitation inches (mm)	1.42 (36)	1.30 (33)	0.74 (19)	0.83 (21)	0.85 (22)	1.32 (34)	2.03 (52)	2.99 (76)	3.95 (100)	2.74 (70)	1.76 (45)	1.65 (42)	21.58 (550)
Average snowfall inches (cm)	11.2 (28)	14.1 (36)	6.5 (17)	1.2 (3.0)	0.0 (0.0)	0.0 (0.0)	0.0 (0.0)	0.0 (0.0)	0.0 (0.0)	2.2 (5.6)	10.6 (27)	15.5 (39)	61.3 (155.6)
Average precipitation days (≥ 0.01 in)	9.7	9.1	8.1	8.9	11.4	12.2	14.4	17.2	20.8	17.0	11.5	12.3	152.6
Average snowy days (≥ 0.1 in)	8	8	4	1	0	0	0	0	0	1	7	9	38
Source 1: NOAA
Source 2: XMACIS2 (records, monthly max/mins & 2004–2023 snowfall/days)

== Demographics ==
Historical population
Census	Pop.	Note	%±
1960	332		—
1970	1,202		262.0%
1980	2,320		93.0%
1990	3,482		50.1%
2000	3,759		8.0%
2010	4,163		10.7%
2020	4,342		4.3%
U.S. Decennial Census

Soldotna first appeared on the 1960 U.S. Census as an unincorporated village. It formally incorporated in 1967.

=== 2020 census ===
As of the 2020 census, Soldotna had a population of 4,342. The median age was 39.6 years. Of residents, 23.7% were under the age of 18 and 20.7% of residents were 65 years of age or older. For every 100 females there were 92.0 males, and for every 100 females age 18 and over there were 87.5 males age 18 and over.

Of residents, 84.5% lived in urban areas, while 15.5% lived in rural areas.

There were 1,853 households in Soldotna, of which 28.5% had children under the age of 18 living in them. Of all households, 40.7% were married-couple households, 19.6% were households with a male householder and no spouse or partner present, and 32.7% were households with a female householder and no spouse or partner present. About 35.5% of all households were made up of individuals and 16.4% had someone living alone who was 65 years of age or older.

There were 2,155 housing units, of which 14.0% were vacant. The homeowner vacancy rate was 0.6% and the rental vacancy rate was 10.4%.

Racial composition as of the 2020 census
Race	Number	Percent
White	3,419	78.7%
Black or African American	41	0.9%
American Indian and Alaska Native	253	5.8%
Asian	86	2.0%
Native Hawaiian and Other Pacific Islander	25	0.6%
Some other race	77	1.8%
Two or more races	441	10.2%
Hispanic or Latino (of any race)	241	5.6%

=== 2010 census ===
As of the 2010 US Census, there were 4,163 people residing in 1,720 households in the city. The population density was 563 people per square mile.

The racial makeup of the city was 86 percent White, 0.3 percent Black or African American, 4.3 percent Native American, 1.6 percent Asian, 0.3 percent Pacific Islander, 0.8 percent from other races, and 6.8 percent from two or more races. Hispanic or Latino residents of all races comprised 3.9 percent of the population.

There were 1,720 households, out of which 30.1 percent had children under the age of 18 living with them, 44 percent were married (husband-wife) couples living together, 11.9 percent had a female householder with no husband present, and 38.7 percent were non-families. Of all households, 32 percent were made up of individuals living alone, 9.2 percent of whom were 65 years of age or older. The average household size was 2.38 and the average family size was 3.02.

The age distribution of the population shows 26 percent under the age of 18 and 13 percent age 65 or older. The median age was 34.6 years.

=== Income ===
The 2012 estimated median income for a household in the city was $44,805, and the median income for a family was $56,208. The per capita income for the city was $30,553. About 3 percent of families and 6.1 percent of the population were below the poverty line, including 2.9 percent of those under age 18 and 8.3 percent of those age 65 or over.

== Education ==
Kenai Peninsula College

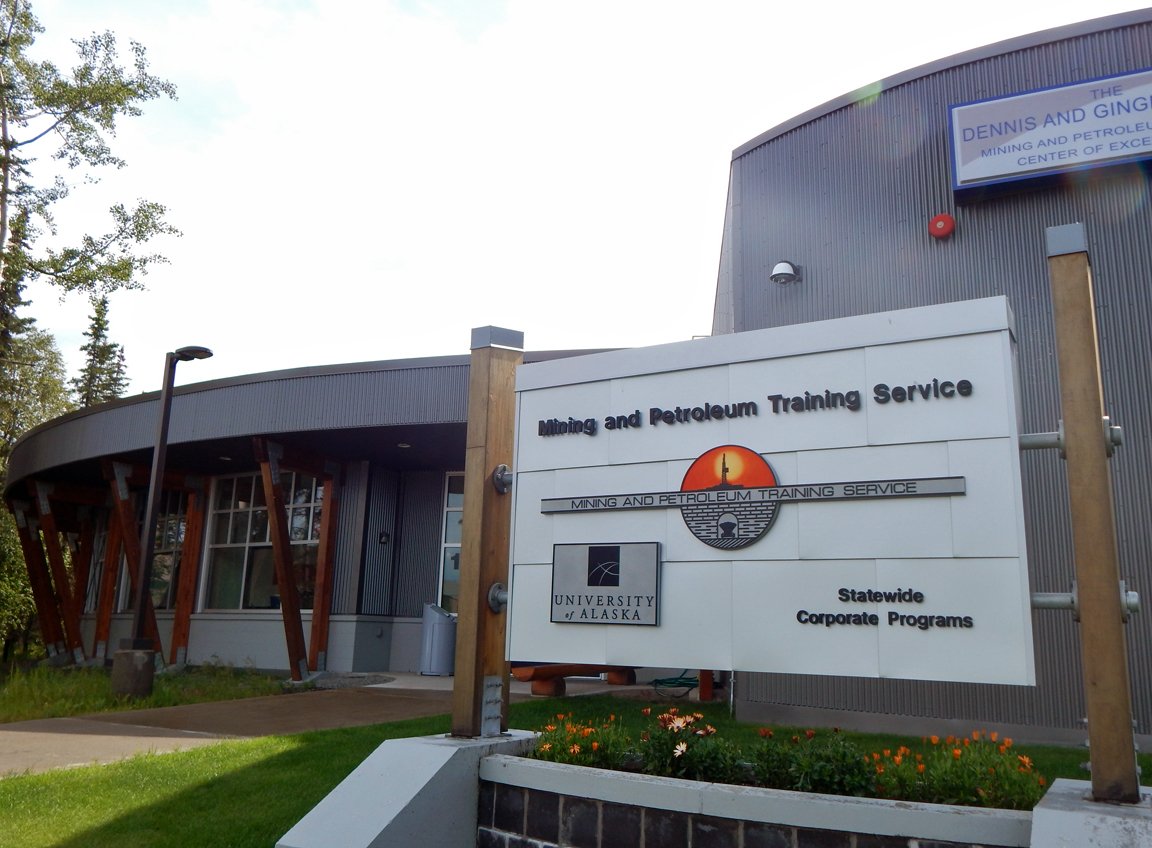
Mining and Petroleum Training Service Building

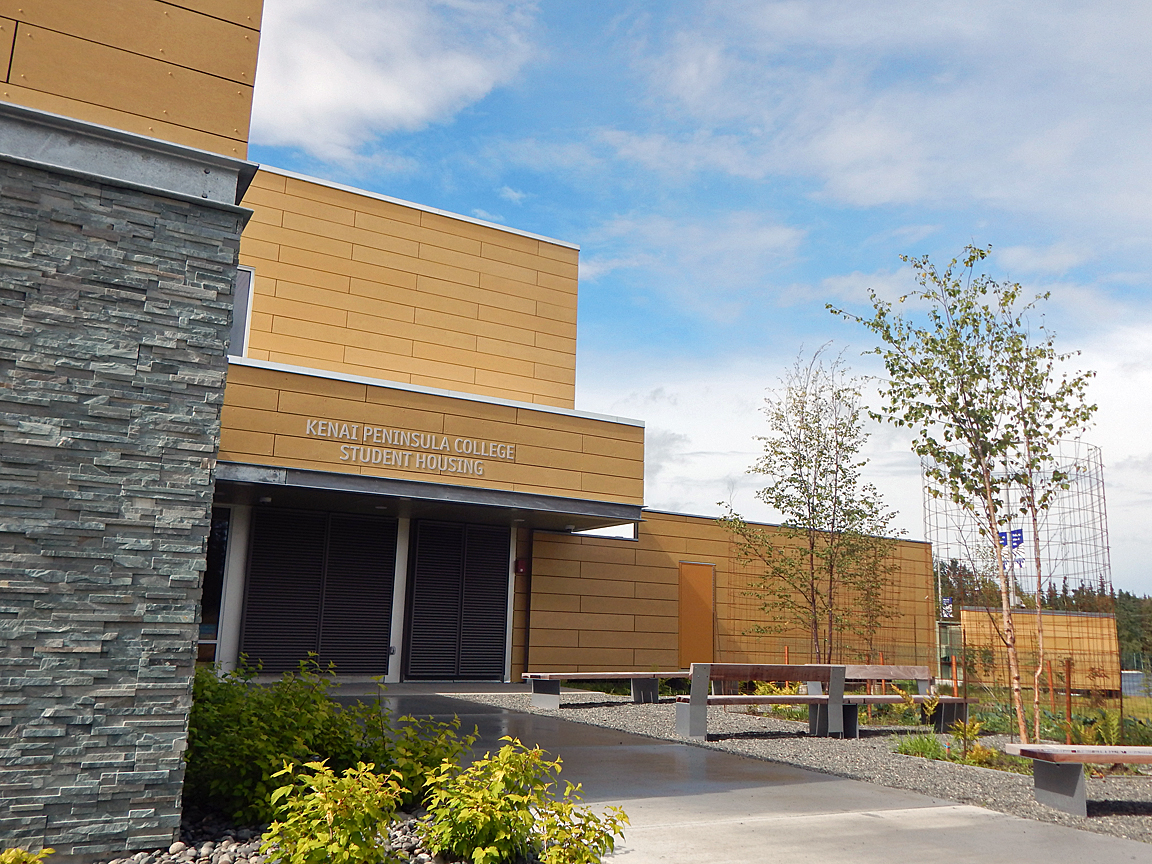
Student Housing Building

=== Post-secondary education ===
Soldotna is home to the Kenai Peninsula College’s (KPC) Kenai River Campus, a division of the University of Alaska Anchorage. The campus sits among 300 wooded acres on Soldotna's west side and includes a library, laboratories, computer labs, a residence hall, and an art gallery. The Kenai River Campus enrolls approximately 2,500 students a semester and offers associate's and bachelor's degrees, certificate programs, and occupational endorsement certificates.

The Amundsen Educational Center is a non-profit educational and vocational training school located on the eastern edge of the city. The AEC offers courses in building construction, office occupations, and medical coding.

Alaska Christian College offers an associate degree in Behavioral Health, Christian Ministry, General Studies, and Paraprofessional Education.

=== Primary and secondary education ===
Soldotna schools are administered under the Kenai Peninsula Borough District (KPBSD) school board. Public elementary schools include Soldotna Elementary, Redoubt Elementary, and Kalifornsky Beach Elementary.

Skyview Middle School serves all students in grades 7–8, as well as students from Sterling Elementary and Tustumena Elementary outside the city's boundaries. Students attend Soldotna High School for grades 9–12.

There are also a number of private schools.

== Arts and culture ==
The Soldotna Visitor Center, located at the Kenai River Bridge, includes wildlife displays of brown and black bear, dall sheep, bison, wolverines, bald eagles, mountain goats, king crabs, various birds and the world record king salmon. Located near the Soldotna Visitor Center is the Homestead Museum, a collection of early structures including the original Slikok Valley School and examples of homestead cabins. The museum also houses Alaska Native artifacts.

The Joyce K. Carver Memorial Library on Binkley Street was remodeled in 2013, providing media resources to the greater Soldotna community. The library offers six desktop computers and two laptops for public access and free Wi-Fi for anyone with wireless enabled devices.

=== Environmental stewardship ===
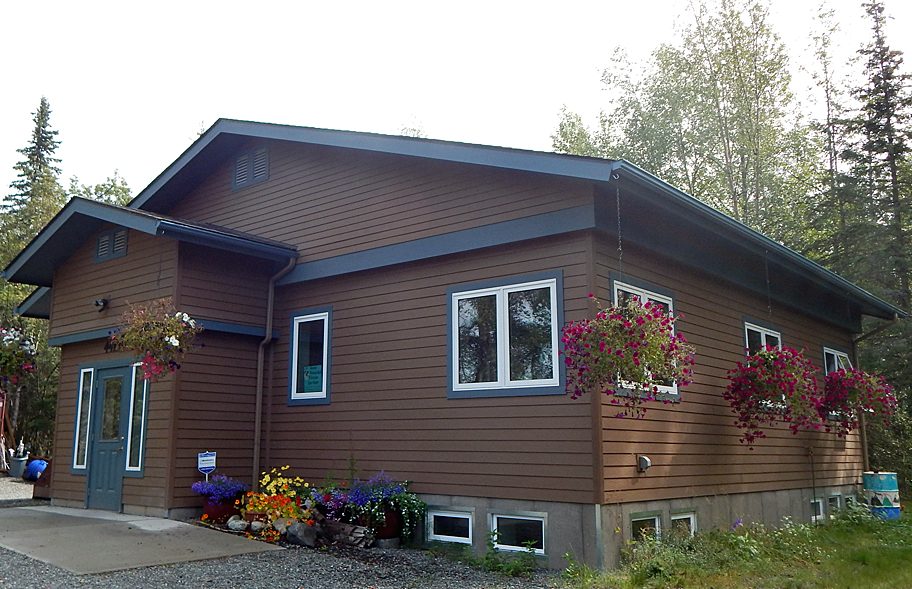
Kenai Watershed Forum in the historic Ralph Soberg House

The Kenai Watershed Forum (KWF) is a non-profit organization located in the historic Ralph Soberg House inside Soldotna Creek Park. The KWF works to maintain the health of the watersheds on the Kenai Peninsula. Its programs include Stream Watch, which trains volunteers to protect the Russian and Kenai Rivers; a summer camp for 6-12 year olds; and environmental restoration projects ranging from invasive plant remediation to riverbed reconstruction to culvert reconfiguration/replacement.

The Kenai National Wildlife Refuge consists of 1.92 million acres in a variety of ecosystems including ice fields and glaciers, mountain tundra, northern boreal forests, and lakes, wetlands and rivers. The Chickaloon River Flats remains the last pristine major saltwater estuary on the Kenai Peninsula and attracts thousands of migratory waterfowl and shorebirds annually. The Refuge is also home to brown and black bears, dall sheep, moose, and caribou. The Kenai National Wildlife Refuge Visitor Center is located on Ski Hill Road close to the intersection of Funny River Road and the Sterling Highway.

== Sister cities ==
- Kenai, Alaska

== Transportation ==
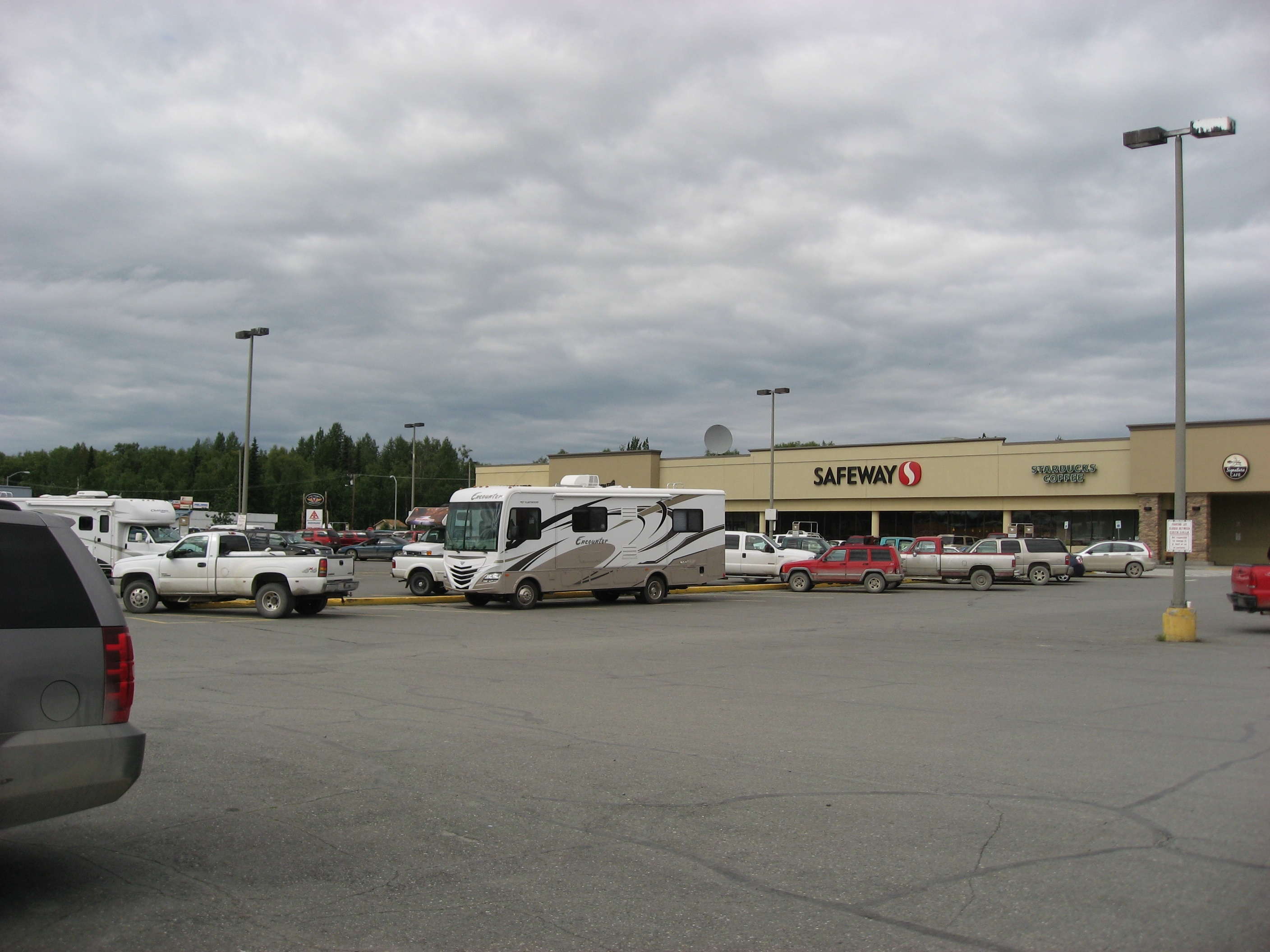
Shopping mall at Binkley Street and the Sterling Highway

=== Road ===
The Sterling Highway runs through and connects the eastern and central portions of the city. Its intersection with the start of the Kenai Spur Highway, widely known as the "Soldotna Y" due to its previous Y-shaped configuration, is a local landmark. The Kenai Spur Highway connects neighborhoods in the north-central portion of the city to other parts of Soldotna, adjoining Ridgeway and beyond to Kenai, Salamatof and Nikiski, ending along Cook Inlet at the Captain Cook State Recreation Area.

The western portions of Soldotna are connected by local roads (east of the Kenai River) and Kalifornsky Beach Road (west of the river). "K-Beach" Road, as it is often known, is a loop to the west of the Sterling Highway. At its northern end, it straddles the southernmost portions of city limits (including Kenai Peninsula College and the Soldotna Sports Center) and adjoining Kalifornsky. Continuing past city limits, K-Beach provides an alternate access to Kenai along the south side of the Kenai River via the Warren Ames Memorial Bridge, the last road crossing downriver, then continues west and south, returning to the Sterling Highway at Kasilof. Funny River Road continues eastbound from the northern terminus of K-Beach Road, connecting the Sterling Highway with Soldotna Airport (see below), Kenai National Wildlife Refuge headquarters and Funny River.

Almost all of the city's commercial districts are arrayed along these roads. Interior arterial and collector streets, such as Binkley and Kobuk streets and Marydale and Redoubt avenues, primarily provide access either to residential areas or to community facilities such as the borough building, the post office, Central Peninsula Hospital and Soldotna High School

=== Air ===
Soldotna Airport (FAA LID and IATA: SXQ, ICAO: PASX) is a city-owned, public use airport located in the southeastern corner of city limits, across the Kenai River from the city center. Primary access to the airport is from Funny River Road, a short distance east of its intersection with the Sterling Highway.

Two plane crashes associated with operations at the airport, one on February 4, 1985, involving a commuter flight from Anchorage and one on July 7, 2013, involving an air taxi flight, resulted in the deaths of all on-board (nine and ten fatalities, respectively).

=== Public transit ===
Public transit is offered through CARTS (Central Area Rural Transit System), an on-demand shuttle system serving the communities of Kenai, Soldotna, Funny River, Kasilof, Nikiski, and Sterling. CARTS does not operate like a conventional "city bus". there are no fixed routes, bus stops, or flagstops. Riders must arrange pickup by phone the day before.

== Recreation and sports ==
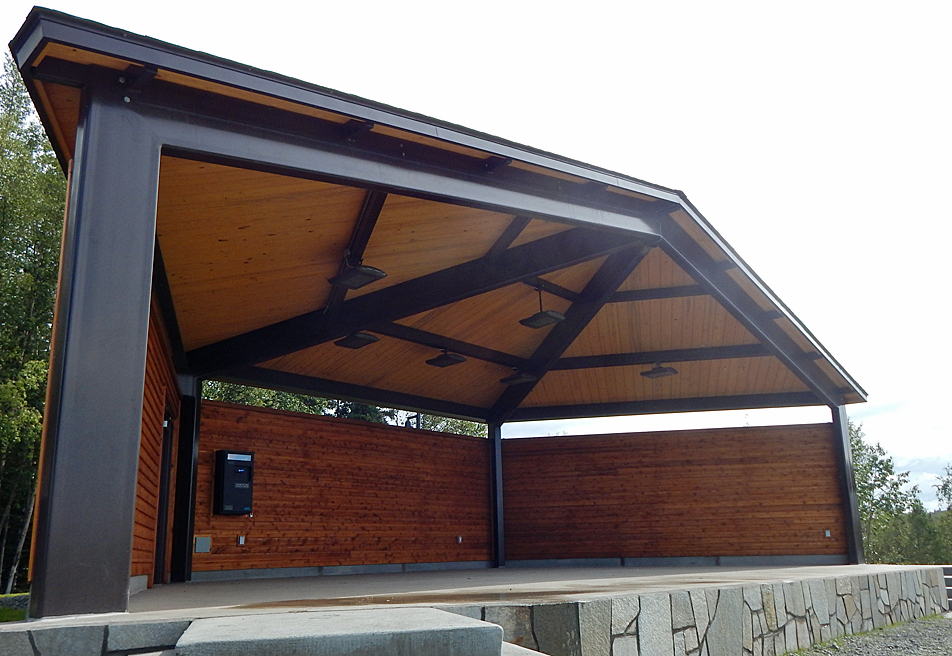
Soldotna Creek Park Amphitheater in Downtown Soldotna

The City of Soldotna operates eleven recreational parks and a memorial park:

- Swiftwater Park contains campsites, river access, a boat launch, RV dumps, access to wood and ice, and restrooms.
- Centennial Park contains campsites, river access, a boat launch, RV dumps, access to wood and ice, and restrooms.
- Rotary Park contains river access.
- Soldotna Creek Park contains river access, an amphitheater, a community playground, picnic pavilions, restrooms, and open green spaces. The Kenai Watershed Forum is also located in the park at the historic Ralph Soberg House.
- Farnsworth Park contains a playground, picnic pavilions, restrooms, and open green spaces.
- Aspen Park, Pioneer Park, Parker Park, Riverview Park, and Sunrise Park are neighborhood parks.
- Karen Street Park contains skating and BMX infrastructure.
- Memorial Park is the city cemetery and columbarium.

Additionally, the city owns Arc Lake, located on the Sterling Highway just south of the city limits.

Tsalteshi Trails are located just south of Soldotna with two trailheads; behind Skyview Middle School and across from the Soldotna Sports Center on Kalifornsky Beach Road. The trail system contains over 25 kilometers (16 miles) of trails groomed for cross country skiing in the winter and open for hikers, runners, mountain bikers and leashed dogs when there is no snow.

The Soldotna Regional Sports Complex is home to the Kenai River Brown Bears, a Tier II junior hockey team that plays in the North American Hockey League.

Les Anderson, at the time the owner of Soldotna's Ford dealership, holds the record for the largest king salmon, caught here on May 17, 1985, and weighing in at 97 lb 4 oz. The record-setting fish is on display at the Soldotna Visitor Center.

Fish counts are determined by sonar fish counters. They are rough estimates based on averages over a prolonged period. For 2012, king salmon were estimated at 5,173, while red salmon were estimated at 1,581,555.

== Economy ==
=== Government and communities ===
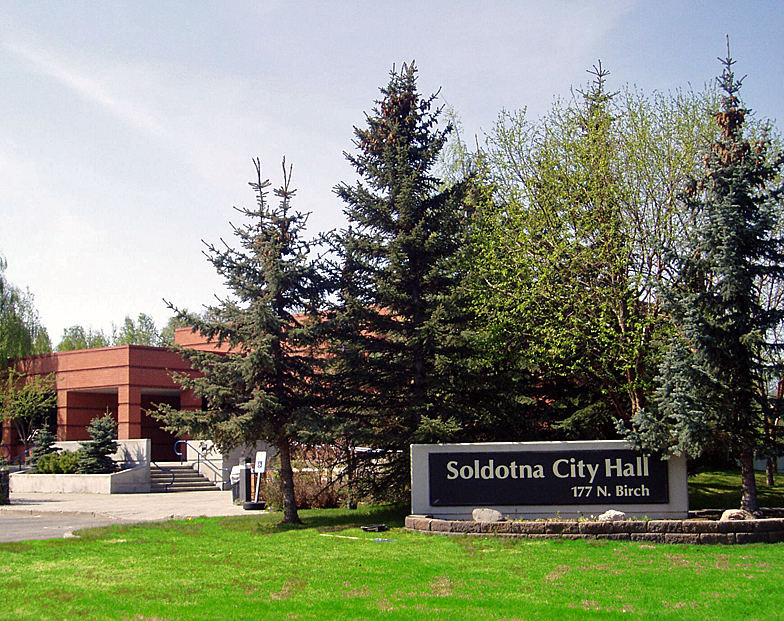
Soldotna City Hall

In addition to the city government offices, Soldotna is home to the Kenai Peninsula Borough administration and the Kenai Peninsula Borough School District administration. The Donald E. Gilman River Center is a multi-agency permitting, information and education center on Funny River Road near the Soldotna municipal airport. The Center houses staff from the Alaska State Parks agency, the Kenai Peninsula Borough (including the habitat protection, floodplain management, and coastal district programs), the Alaska Department of Fish and Game, and the Kenai Watershed Forum.

Electricity is supplied by the consumer-owned Soldotna Generation Plant, operating a 40 MW General Electric LM6000 natural gas turbine. The local grid is islanded after the 2019 Swan Lake Fire. A 46 MW two-hour grid battery started grid stability and peak power in January 2022.

=== Healthcare ===
The Central Peninsula Hospital is the largest medical facility on the peninsula with 49 beds, an emergency care facility, and specialties including family medicine, ear-nose-throat, birthing center, general surgery, neurology, OB/GYN, oncology, ophthalmology, orthopedics, pathology, pediatrics, podiatry, psychiatry and radiology.

Many smaller healthcare providers and healthcare-related businesses have located in Soldotna to take advantage of proximity to the Central Peninsula hospital.

=== Tourism ===
Tourism on the Kenai Peninsula revolves heavily around outdoor activities, including fishing, hunting, hiking, camping, and canoeing/rafting. Soldotna provides several city-owned, public access parks along the Kenai River. The river contains all five Pacific salmon species, as well as other salmonids such as Dolly Varden and rainbow trout. Soldotna is also in close proximity to the Kenai National Wildlife Refuge, Tsalteshi Trails, and various waterways (the Kenai and Kasilof Rivers, Soldotna and Slikok Creeks, and Skilak and Tustumena Lakes). The Kenai River was selected by CNN Travel as one of the "World's 15 Best Rivers for Travelers," due to its fishing and hunting opportunities.

== Notable people ==
- Travis Hall (born 1972), born in Soldotna and raised nearby in Kenai, Alaska; NFL football player
- Emily Johnson (born 1976), choreographer, dancer; born in Soldotna
- Chris Mabeus (born 1979), grew up in Soldotna and played Major League Baseball for the Milwaukee Brewers
