= Kenai Peninsula Borough School District =

School district in Alaska, United States

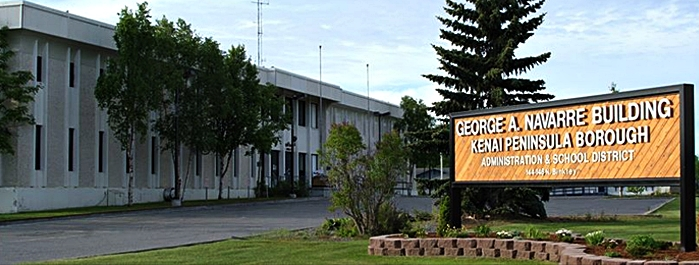
- The George A. Navarre Building Soldotna is the headquarters for the Kenai Peninsula Borough and the school district.

Address
- 148 North Binkley Street Soldotna, Alaska, 99669; United States

District information
- Grades: PK–12
- Superintendent: Clayton Holland
- Schools: 42
- NCES District ID: 0200390

Students and staff
- Students: 8,510 (2024–2025)
- Teachers: 511.19 (on an FTE basis)
- Staff: 577.8 (on an FTE basis)
- Student–teacher ratio: 16.65

Other information
- Website: kpbsd.org

The Kenai Peninsula Borough School District (KPBSD) serves 29 communities in the Kenai Peninsula Borough, with 8,510 students as of 2024–25. The district is headquartered in the borough seat of Soldotna, and the current Superintendent of Schools is Clayton Holland.

== Schools ==
School name	Grades	Location
Connections Homeschool	K-12	Homeschool
Chapman School	K-8	Anchor Point
Cooper Landing School	K–12	Cooper Landing
Kachemak-Selo	K–12	Fritz Creek
Voznesenka School	K-12	Fritz Creek
Marathon School	7-12	Kennai
McNeil Canyon Elementary	K–6	Homer
Paul Banks Elementary	K–2	Homer
Razdolna School	K–12	Fritz Creek
Homer Flex	9–12	Homer
Homer High	9–12	Homer
Homer Middle	7–8	Homer
West Homer Elementary	3–6	Homer
Hope School	K–12	Hope
Tustumena Elementary	K–6	Kasilof
Kenai Alternative High	9–12	Kenai
Kenai Central High	9–12	Kenai
Kenai Middle	6–8	Kenai
Mt. View Elementary	K-5	Kenai
Moose Pass School	K–8	Moose Pass
Nanwalek School	K–12	Nanwalek
Nikiski North Star Elementary	K–5	Nikiski
Nikiski Middle/High School	6–12	Nikiski
Ninilchik School	K–12	Ninilchik
Port Graham School	K–12	Port Graham
River City Academy	7-12	Soldotna
Susan B. English	K–12	Seldovia
Seward Elementary	K–5	Seward
Seward High	9–12	Seward
Seward Middle	6-8	Seward
K-Beach Elementary	K–6	Soldotna
Redoubt Elementary	K–6	Soldotna
Soldotna Elementary	K–6	Soldotna
Skyview Middle	7–8	Soldotna
Soldotna High	9-12	Soldotna
Sterling Elementary	K–6	Sterling
Tebughna School	K–12	Tyonek

=== Charter schools ===
Aurora Borealis	K–8	Kenai
Fireweed Academy	K-6	Homer
Kaleidoscope School	K-5	Kenai
Soldotna Montessori	K–6	Soldotna

== Statistics ==
- KPBSD serves 44 sites in 21 diverse communities.
- KPBSD covers 25,600 square miles (66,000 km^{2}) which is larger than the entire state of West Virginia.
- The district's total student population is 7% American Indian/Alaska Native.
