= Kokruagarok, Alaska =

Unincorporated community in the state of Alaska, United States

Kokruagarok
- Unincorporated community
- Location within the state of Alaska
- Coordinates: 70°54′54″N 153°4′21″W
- Country: United States
- State: Alaska
- Borough: North Slope

Government
  - Borough mayor: Harry K. Brower, Jr.
  - State senator: Donny Olson (D)
  - State rep.: Dean Westlake (D)
- Elevation: 0 ft (0 m)
- Time zone: UTC-9 (Alaska (AKST))
  - Summer (DST): UTC-8 (AKDT)
- Area code: 907
- GNIS ID: 1404906

== Kokruagarok ==
Kokruagarok is a small unincorporated community in North Slope Borough, Alaska, United States. It is a traditional inupiat campsite that was first recorded in the 1951 U.S. Coast and Geodetic Survey. Kokruagarok is unique in many aspects including its lack of a permanent population. On top of this, there is no permanent infrastructure.

=== Climate ===
The climate in Kokruagarok is defined as Arctic Tundra. This type of climate is known to have harsh winters, little precipitation, and permafrost. The Tundra is known for its lack of trees and little vegetation, causing the humans and animals living here to become adaptive to these unique conditions.

=== Economy ===
The people of Kokruagarok depend on their environment and resources to make a living. They rely on the harvest of various fish, plants, and marine mammals. Plants are very important to their economy as they rely on them for materials, cultural aspects, and food.
