= Denaʼina language =

Athabaskan language of Alaska

Denaʼina
- Tanaina
- Denaʼina Qenaga, Denaʼinaqʼ
- Native to: United States
- Region: Alaska (Cook Inlet region, Lake Clark, Lake Iliamna)
- Ethnicity: 1,000 Denaʼina people
- Native speakers: 5 (2020)
- Language family: Na-Dené: Athabaskan; Northern Athabaskan; Denaʼina
- Writing system: Latin (Denaʼina alphabet)

Official status
- Official language in: Alaska

Language codes
- ISO 639-3: tfn
- Glottolog: tana1289
- ELP: Dena'ina
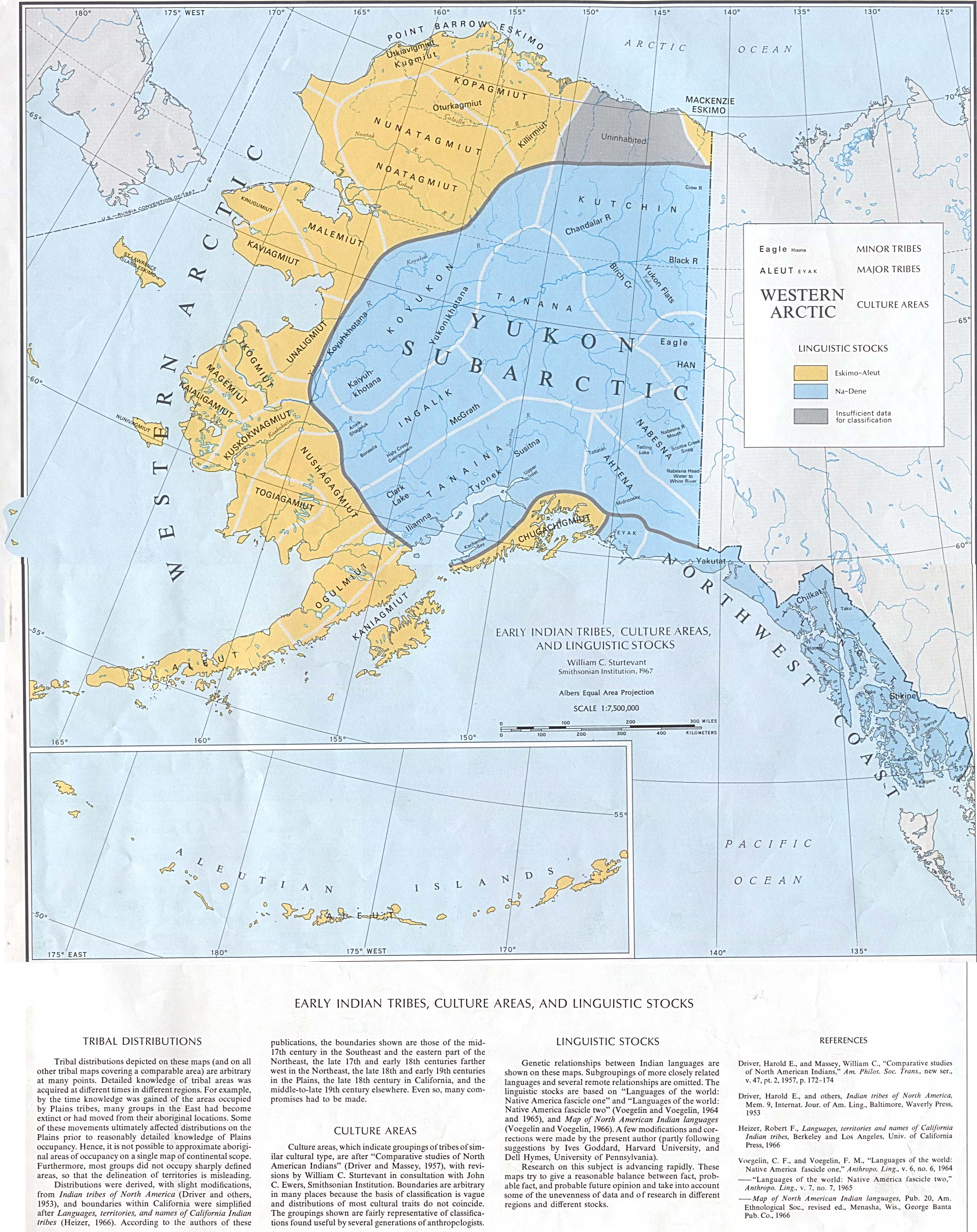
- Map of Alaskan languages, with Dena'ina near the center

- Tanaina is classified as Severely Endangered by the UNESCO Atlas of the World's Languages in Danger.

- Person: Dena
- People: Denaʼina
- Language: Denaʼina Qenaga
- Country: Dena'ina Ełnena

Denaʼina (/dɪ.ˈnaɪ.nə/, dih-NYE-nə; also Tanaina), is the Athabaskan language of the region surrounding Cook Inlet. It is geographically unique in Alaska as the only Alaska Athabaskan language to include territory which borders salt water. Of the total Denaʼina population of about 900 people, only 75–95 members still speak Denaʼina.

== Dialects ==
Four dialects are usually distinguished:

1. Upper Inlet, spoken in Eklutna, Knik, Susitna, Tyonek
2. Outer Inlet, spoken in Kenai, Kustatan, Seldovia
3. Iliamna, spoken in Pedro Bay, Old Iliamna, Lake Iliamna area
4. Inland, spoken in Nondalton, Lime Village

== Documentation ==
James Kari has done extensive work on the language since 1972, including his edition with Alan Boraas of the collected writings of Peter Kalifornsky in 1991. Joan M. Tenenbaum also conducted extensive field research on the language in the 1970s.

== Name ==
The word Denaʼina is composed of the dena, meaning 'person' and the human plural suffix ina. While the apostrophe which joins the two parts of this word ordinarily indicates a glottal stop, most speakers pronounce this with a diphthong, so that the second syllable of the word rhymes with English 'nine' (as in the older spelling Tanaina).

Denaʼina
Gladys Evanoff pronouncing Denaʼina

== Geographic distribution ==
Denaʼina is spoken in the region of south-central Alaska surrounding Cook Inlet.

=== Current status ===
There are about 1,000 Denaʼina people. As of 2007, there are 75–90 speakers, and in 1970 there were only 10 speakers of the Kenai dialect.

Linguist Michael E. Krauss provides three levels of endangerment: safe; endangered, where the language is being learned by children but requires community effort to maintain it; and moribund, where the language is not being learned by children. According to this classification, the Denaʼina is a moribund language.

==== Revitalization efforts ====
There are various efforts to revitalize the language.

- The Denaʼina Archiving, Training and Access grant (DATA) aims to archive and provide access to Denaʼina materials. It also attempts to train community members in technology.
- Lake Clark National Park maintains a catalog of audio recordings of the language.
- Some books are being published on Denaʼina language and culture, and there is a yearly Denaʼina festival, followed by a three-week intensive course led by elders.
- At the Kenai Peninsula College, there is a language class on the Cook Inlet dialect. As of October 2014, there are only 15 students, all young adults, in the class, but this indicates momentum. The class's curriculum is formed from the collected grammars published by linguists.
- University of Alaska Anchorage offers Dena'ina Language classes every fall-Elementary Dena'ina Language I and every spring-Dena'ina Language II.

Contributing factors to the endangerment include the policy of early territorial schools to not let native students speak their own language, especially in regards to the Kenai dialect. This policy was often enforced via corporal punishment; the trauma caused elders, all within one generation, to avoid speaking the language.

== Phonology ==
Denaʼina is one of seven Alaska Athabaskan languages which does not distinguish phonemic tone.

=== Consonants ===
The consonants of Denaʼina in practical orthography, with IPA equivalents.

		Labial	Dental			Palatal	Velar	Uvular	Glottal
		Labial	plain	lateral	sibilant	Palatal	Velar	Uvular	Glottal
Nasal		m ⟨m⟩	n ⟨n⟩						
Plosive and Affricate	plain	(p ⟨b⟩)	t ⟨d⟩	t͡ɬ ⟨dl⟩	t͡s ⟨dz⟩	t͡ʃ ⟨j⟩	k ⟨g⟩	q ⟨gg⟩	ʔ ⟨'⟩
Plosive and Affricate	aspirated		tʰ ⟨t⟩	t͡ɬʰ ⟨tl⟩	t͡sʰ ⟨ts⟩	t͡ʃʰ ⟨ch⟩	kʰ ⟨k⟩	qʰ ⟨q⟩	
Plosive and Affricate	ejective		tʼ ⟨t'⟩	t͡ɬʼ ⟨tl'⟩	t͡sʼ ⟨ts'⟩	t͡ʃʼ ⟨ch'⟩	kʼ ⟨k'⟩	qʼ ⟨q'⟩	
Fricative	voiceless	(f ⟨f⟩)		ɬ ⟨ɬ⟩	s ⟨s⟩	ʃ ⟨sh⟩	x ⟨x⟩	χ ⟨h⟩	h ⟨ĥ⟩
Fricative	voiced	v ⟨v⟩			z ⟨z⟩	ʒ ⟨zh⟩	ɣ ⟨ŷ⟩	ʁ ⟨gh⟩	
Approximant				l ⟨l⟩	(ɹ ⟨r⟩) (Note: [ɹ] is only found in English loanwords.)	j ⟨y⟩	(w ⟨w⟩)		

=== Vowels ===
The 4 vowels of Denaʼina. Close vowels are more open in the environment of a uvular consonant.

	Front	Central	Back
Close	i		u
Mid		ə ⟨e⟩	
Open		a	

Generally, the vowels i, a, and u are considered 'long' vowels and are fully pronounced in words, however the e is considered a reduced vowel similar to the English schwa.

=== Syllable structure ===
In the Inland dialect, syllables at the end of a semantic unit are often longer, lower in pitch, and have longer rhymes. The onset of a syllable has consonant clusters of up to three, such as CCCVC, though these are rare and more commonly, a syllable onset is one or two consonants.

== Writing systems ==
Dena'ina uses a variant of the Latin alphabet, though a Dena'ina artist, Argent Kvasnikoff, created a custom alphabet for the language.

== Grammar ==
=== Morphology ===
Denaʼina is a polysynthetic language where a single word can translate to an entire sentence in English. For example:

nu- n- t- n- gh- sh- l- 'ił
again- you- FUT- see- FUT- I- CL- see/FUT
"I will see you again."

Verbs are the most complex part of speech in the Denaʼina language. They vary in verb paradigms which in turn vary by subject, object, or aspect.

The following example is of -lan the verb "to be" in the imperfective aspect and in the Nondalton dialect.

-lan, the verb "to be" imperfective aspect Nondalton dialect
	Singular	Plural
1st person	eshlan I am	ch'ilan we are
2nd person	inlan you are	ehlan you all are
3rd person	nlan he/she/it is	qilan they are
areal	qilan area is	

=== Grammatical categories ===
Denaʼina indicates classification with obligatory verb prefixes, and so the root verb appears at the end of the word. The verb will always specify a classification, in addition to often person, gender, or object prefixes that indicate elements of the noun. Number can also be indicated by suffixes on the noun; the singular person suffix on a noun is generally -en, whereas the plural suffix is generally -na or -ina. Plurals for non-persons that are animate are indicated by the noun suffixes -qa, -ha, and -yi. Inanimate plurals are unable to be indicated by a noun suffix, and instead attach to the verb.

For examples of person indication on the verb, see the chart under the morphology section above concerning the verb root -lan. Denaʼina specifies between 1st person singular/plural, 2nd person singular/plural, 3rd person singular/plural, and areal.

Verbs fall into many categories that are broadly lumped into "active" and "neuter", where an active verb indicates movement, a state of being incomplete, something being made, or in the production of sound, and a neuter verb indicates a general state of being that is complete. Categories of classification that are affixed to a verb also can refer to certain characteristics of the object of that verb. Depending on the gender affix that follows the classificatory affix, the nature of the object can change, as indicated by the following chart:

	Classificatory verbs	Gender prefixes				
	Classificatory verbs	∅-	d-	n-	dn-	q-
1	Single compact object; ʼu	ball, trap, hat, sun, beaver lodge	egg, song, word	berry, bread, roe, coiled rope, head	rock, ring, mirror, box, whetstone	house, plot of land, situation, weather
2	Elongated object; tun	needle, sled, boat, bow, gun	pole, plate, cane, quill, pencil stick	dentalium necklace	mirror	x
3	Enclosed object; łtun	knife, full sack, rolled sleeping bag	pillow, mattress, lake	sack of berries, flour or fish eggs	box of rocks	q+d ravine, valley
4	Fabric-like object; kits	blanket, net, paper, open sleeping bag, empty sack, skin without hair	skin with hair, fur, caribou mat			
5	Object in open vessel; qu	sugar, water in container	eggs or wood chips in bucket	berries or roe in container	rocks or coal in bucket	x
6	Animate object; ta	person, dog, doll, crucifix	x	x	x	x
7	Food; kit	piece of meat, dry fish	beaver's food pile	roe	x	x
8	Mushy object; tlaqʼ	mud, rotted food, wet cloth, butter	wet tea leaves	fish eggs (not in container)	x	pile of refuse, area of soft ground
9	Plural objects; lu	traps, boots, dogs	eggs, plates, cups, words, tobacco, songs, waves	sg. uncoiled rope, pl. coiled ropes, beads, berries, roe, snare	rocks, whetstones, boxes	houses, objects over area, freight
10	Multiple objects; chuqʼ	sand, glacier ice	chips of wood	berries	rocks	earth, clouds

However, there are other categories of classification or instrumentation that indicate how an action was done or aspects about the outcome of the action. Many instrumental affixes have become causative over time. Causality is expressed by changing a classifier in the verb to "ł". Instrumental affixes that indicate the manner or motion of an action include the following: "-aqʼa", which refers to clubbing an object or leaving a depression in the snow; "-dni", which refers to causing an object to leave, disappear, or die; "-du", which refers to affecting an object with the mouth; "-eł,-eła, and -ł", which all indicate that the object being referred to was used in an instrumental sense; "-iqu (uqu)", which refers to a pointing motion; "-kʼ", which refers to a wiping motion; and "-lu", which refers to the use of a hand.

=== Space relations ===
==== Postpositions ====
Denaʼina shows space relations through the addition of morphemes that are either independent or bound, known as postpositions.

- Independent postpositions follow a noun. For example, "miłni det" (without water) is composed of the noun "miłni" (water) and the postposition "det" (without).
- Bound postpositions follow a pronoun or a noun, but are said and written as one word, and are often related to directionals.
  - Sheł ("with me") is composed of the pronoun sh ("me") and the postposition eł ("with").
  - Object + -ch' (towards the object, in the direction of the object)
    - Nach' gheyuł = "He is walking towards us"
  - Object + -a (object spends time)
    - Ba shan hghizet = "He spent the whole summer day"
    - Be = "him/her" (be + a = ba)

Postpositions can also be incorporated into a verb as a prefix.

==== Demonstratives ====
Space relations can also be marked by demonstratives pronouns, which indicate proximal/distal distinction.

- ghin – that
- ghini – that/these things, non-human and distant
- gini – this/these things, non-human and close by
- ghu – there in the distance
- ghunen – that person, human and distant
- gu – here, nearby
- gunen – this person, human and close by
- ghuna – those persons, human and distant
- guna – these persons, human and close by

For example:

- ghini dghili = "those mountains"
- ghunen uniłni = "that person calls"
- gunen qisen = "this woman"

==== Adverbs ====
Adverbs of location and direction can also convey space relations.

- nes – out from center
  - nes yanił chet = "he shoved the boat out"
- en – off or away from
  - ye'un = "away from it"
  - ye'un ti'ilgguk = "he went out the door"

==== Directionals ====
The directional system in Denaʼina is based upon river flows, and are used with directional prefixes, roots, and suffixes.

- Prefixes:
  - ey – unmarked
  - yu – distant
  - du – near
- Roots:
  - n'e or ni – upstream
  - du or t'e – downstream
- Suffixes:
  - ∅ – towards
  - -ch' – towards, form
  - -t – at, the place of

For example, yunit means "at a place far upstream", and is composed of the prefix "yu", root "ni", and suffix "t".

=== Time and tense ===
==== Temporal adverbs ====
Temporal adverbs convey information about when an action or intent of the verb occurred.

- ch'qeyan – always
- da'a – never
- janiq' – all day
- janq'u – still

For example:

- janiq'e ghestnu = "I worked all day"
- nunigi ch'qeyan = "always fog"

==== Mode ====
Mode indicates when the action happens. Normal mode is also referred to as tense, and is given by mode/aspect prefix positions in the verbs. The tense modes are the imperfect (present), perfect (past) and the future represented by 4 types of imperfectives—∅, z, n, gh—and 4 types of perfectives—gh, z, n, ∅. There are also 4 modal variations: neuter, inceptive, optative-intentional, and negative.

Tense

- Imperfective mode – action was started and is continuing at the present time
  - ∅ imperfective and gh imperfective – generally means the action in moving toward completion
  - n imperfective – associated w/ motion verbs
  - z imperfective – generally means the action is static
- Perfect mode – action was started and completed in the past
  - gh perfective – most common perfect structure in most aspects
  - n perfective – often used with motion verbs when action has reached terminal state
  - z perfective – generally means the actions have achieved a stable state
  - ∅ perfective – used in transitional themes
- Future mode – action has yet to happen. Used with a future stem, a "ghe" in the mode position, and a "t(e)" in the inceptive position

Modal variations

- Optative-intentional mode – expresses an intent to act
- Inceptive mode – "beginning to" in the imperfect and perfect modes
- Imperfect inceptive
- Perfective inceptive
- Neuter – applicable to neuter verbs, and "to be" neuter

==== Aspect ====
Aspect conveys information about how the action happened, and works in conjunction with tense. The most common aspects are conclusive, momentaneous, neuter, onomatopoetic, and semelfactive. The morpheme attached to the root verb can also change depending on aspect.

		Mode			
		imperfect	perfect	future	optative
Aspect	continuative	ya	ya	ya	Ya
Aspect	durative	nax	Yał	nax	nax
Aspect	momentaneous	ya	yał		
Aspect	neuter	Ya'	Ya'		
Aspect	repetitive	nash	nak	nash	nish

=== Modality ===
Modality is most commonly and easily seen in evidentials which usually appear at the end of a sentence.

- Evidentials – words that emphasize certainty
  - shughu – then it is
  - ł – it is said, it seems, apparently
  - For example:
    - shi shughu = "I am the one"
    - Denaʼina łu k'elen hqghe'n ninya egh = "The Denaʼina, they say, had some beliefs about the animals"
- Emphatics – words that add emphasis
  - shida – I am
  - For example:
    - Albert shi shida = "I am Albert, this is who I am"

=== Predicates, arguments, and case ===
Predicate refers to the main verb and auxiliary verbs, while arguments usually refer to those words outside of the predicate.

Word order in the basic Denaʼina sentence is subject–object–verb (SOV). Because of this, there is a low danger of referential ambiguity. It is rare to have both the subject and the objects as nouns; instead, one or both usually occur as pronouns. Some sentences differ from the SOV structure. In subject–verb (SV), the object is embedded in the verb as a pronoun, or the sentence does not require an object. In object–verb (OV), the subject is a pronoun contained in the verb, and the object is a noun.

An example sentence structure: object pronoun (argument) + outer subject pronoun (argument) + (other prefixes) + inner subject pronoun (argument) + ... verb stem (predicate). This example shows multiple arguments attaching to a single predicate.

A full clause can be expressed in the verb. In the verb, the verb stem is last, and even when embedded in the verb, the object and subject necessarily come first. In Denaʼina, all verbs require a nominative (subject) and an accusative (object), which indicates a nominative-accusative case. This means the marked morphemes, or those that change to convey more specific meanings, are those that indicate the object. Distinction occurs between the nominative and accusative, and each would have its own core argument.

=== Obliques ===
Obliques indicate instrumentals, locatives, and other arguments outside of core arguments. Both core and oblique arguments attach to the verb via prefixes which must occur in a certain order. In Denaʼina, obliques are prefixes to the verb which occur between the object prefix and the inner subject pronoun prefix and/or the outer subject pronoun.

=== Possession ===
==== Inherent possession ====
Denaʼina has inherently possessed nouns and non-verbs. Inherently possessed words consist of a prefix and a stem which are abound morphemes. For example, "shunkda" means "my mother", where "sh-" is the possessive pronoun meaning "my", and "-unkda" is the possessed root meaning "mother".

The pronouns used with inherently possessed bound morphemes:

- sh- = my
- qu- = their
- n- = your (singular)
- k'e- = someone's
- be- = his/her
- de- = his/her own
- na = our
- deh- = their own
- h- = your (plural)
- nił- = each other's

==== Non-inherent possession ====
Non-inherent possession occurs with proper nouns as the possessor, shown by -a or -'an attached as a suffix to the possessed noun. Possessive pronouns are attached as a prefix to the possessed noun and the -'a is added at the end of the word.

=== Complement clauses ===
Complement clauses are clauses that act as the direct object of the verb, introduced by a complementizer (e.g.: in English, "that" or "which"). Complement clauses exist as subordinate clauses and bare clauses, as with other languages in the Athabaskan language family. Some complement clauses are marked by enclitics, and are always embedded as part of the sentence.

Relative suffixes are attached to nouns or verbs, and are one of the few suffixes on verbs. Common relative suffixes include:

- -en = "the person that"
- -t = "the place that"
- -na = "the people that"
- -h = "at, to a general area"
- -i = "the thing that"
- -hdi = "then, next"

== Bibliography ==
- Balluta, Alex; Evanoff, Gladys (2004). Müller, Olga (ed.). Denaʼina Qenaga Duʼidnaghelnik (Denaʼina Words Sound Pretty). Denaʼina Phrases 1: Nondalton Dialect. Anchorage: Alaska Native Heritage Center. Archived from the original on 14 February 2006.
- Boraas, Alan (2009). An Introduction to Denaʼina Grammar: The Kenai (Outer Inlet) Dialect (PDF). Kenai Peninsula College. Archived from the original (PDF) on 3 March 2016.
- Ellana, Linda; Balluta, Andrew (1992). Nuvendaltin Quhtʼana: The People of Nondalton. Washington, D.C.: Smithsonian Institution Press.
- Johnson, Walter (2004). Sukdu Neł Nuhtghelnek: I'll Tell You A Story: Stories I Recall From Growing Up On Iliamna Lake. Fairbanks: Alaska Native Language Center.
- Kalifornsky, Peter (1991). Kari, James; Boraas, Alan (eds.). Kʼtlʼeghʼi Sukdu, A Denaʼina Legacy: The Collected Writings of Peter Kalifornsky. Fairbanks: Alaska Native Language Center.
- Kari, James (1975). "A classification of the Tanaina dialects". Anthropological Papers of the University of Alaska. 17: 49-55.
- Kari, James, ed. (1980). Qʼudi Heyi Niłchʼdiluyi Sukduʼa: "This Years Collected Stories. (Denaʼina Stories from Tyonek and Illiamna Lake). Anchorage: National Bilingual Materials Development Center.
- Kari, James (2007). Denaʼina Topical Dictionary. Fairbanks: Alaska Native Language Center. ISBN 978-1-55500-091-2.
- Kari, James; Kari, Priscilla Russell; McGary, Jane (1983). Denaʼina Ełnena: Tanaina Country. Fairbanks: Alaska Native Language Center.
- Kari, Priscilla Russell (1986). Tanaina Plantlore: Denaʼina Kʼetʼuna (2nd ed.). Anchorage: Alaska Park Service.
- Mithun, Marianne (1999). The Languages of Native Northa America. Cambridge: Cambridge University Press. ISBN 0-521-29875-X.
- Osgood, Cornelius (1937). "Contributions to the Ethnography of the Tanaina". Yale University Publications in Anthropology. 16.
- Stephan, Sava. Kari, James (ed.). "Upper Inlet Denaʼina Language Lessons". Anchorage: Alaska Native Heritage Center. Archived from the original on 28 September 2007.
- Tenenbaum, Joan (1978). Morphology and semantics of the Tanaina verb (Doctoral thesis). Columbia University.
- Tenenbaum, Joan (2006). Denaʼina Sukduʼa (3rd ed.). Fairbanks: Alaska Native Language Center. ISBN 1-55500-090-8.
- Townsend, Joan B. (1981). "Tanaina". In Helm, June (ed.). Handbook of North American Indians. Vol. 6: Subarctic. Washington, D.C.: Smithsonian Institution.
- Wassillie, Albert (1980). Nuvendaltun Htʼana Sukduʼa: Nondalton People's Stories. Anchorage: National Bilingual Materials Development Center.
