= Mary Glackin =

American scientist

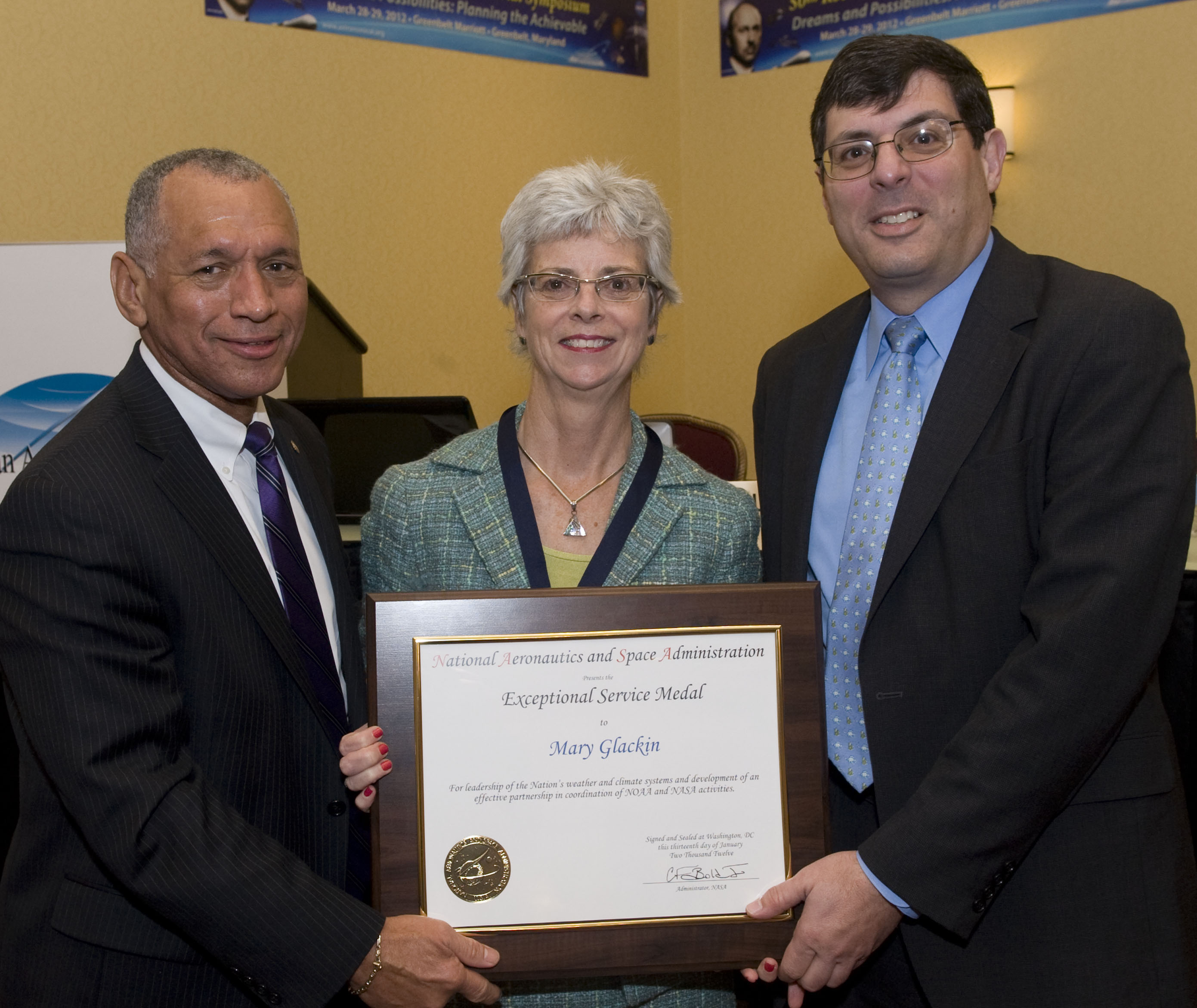
- Mary Glackin receives NASA medal from Charlie Bolden and Chris Scolese.
- Education: Bachelor of Science
- Alma mater: University of Maryland
- Occupation: Computer scientist; administrator
- Employer: National Oceanic and Atmospheric Administration (1978–2012); The Weather Company
- Awards: Presidential Rank Awards; Department of Commerce Silver Medal; Department of Commerce Bronze Medal

Mary M. Glackin is an American scientist. She served as the 2020 president of the American Meteorological Society (AMS).

== Career ==
Glackin was previously senior vice president for science and forecast operations at The Weather Company, an IBM Business. She retired from the National Oceanic and Atmospheric Administration (NOAA) in 2012 as the deputy under secretary for operations, after working in various roles in the organization for 34 years, including with the National Weather Service, where she served as acting director of the agency in 2007, and the U.S. Global Change Research Program.

== Education ==
Glackin has a B.S. from the University of Maryland (1984) with a major in computer science with a concentration in atmospheric science.

== Awards ==
Glackin is a Fellow of AMS and a recipient of the Charles Franklin Brooks Award for Outstanding Service to the Society (2004). She has twice received the U.S. Presidential Rank Award and the Department of Commerce Silver and Bronze Medals. She is a fellow National Academy of Public Administration.

== See also ==
- Stephanie Herring – spent the early part of her NOAA career working for Glackin
