= James Kari =

American linguist

- James Kari at ACCAP lecture, March 2023
- Born: October 21, 1944 (age 81); Vallejo, CA

Academic work
- Discipline: Linguist
- Sub-discipline: Dene languages
- Institutions: Alaska Native Language Center

James Kari is an American linguist and Professor Emeritus with the Alaska Native Language Center at the University of Alaska Fairbanks (UAF) specializing in the Dene (a.k.a. Athabascan languages) of Alaska. He served on the faculty of UAF from 1973 to his retirement in 1997.

For more than fifty years Kari has done extensive linguistic work in many Dene languages. These include Ahtna, Dena'ina, Koyukon, Deg Hit'an, Holikachuk, Lower Tanana, Middle Tanana, Tanacross, Upper Tanana, and Babine-Witsuwit'en.

== Education ==
He earned his Ph.D. in curriculum and instruction and linguistics from University of New Mexico in 1973. His doctoral dissertation, Navajo Verb Prefix Phonology, later published in 1976, became a widely used text in Navajo linguistics. He previously completed a Master of Arts in teaching at Reed College in 1969 and a B.A. in English at University of California, Los Angeles, in 1966. From 1966 to 1968, he served as an English teacher in Bafra, Turkey, with the U.S. Peace Corps.

== Academic career ==
Kari has spent is his academic career at the University of Alaska Fairbanks, particularly at the Alaska Native Language Center. He joined the institution in 1973 as a post-doc, then as an assistant professor from 1975 to 1981, then was promoted to associate professor from 1982 to 1993, and later served as professor of linguistics from 1993 to 1997. He was named professor emeritus of linguistics in 1997.

== Selected works ==
Books

- Kari, James. 1976. Navajo Verb Prefix Phonology. New York: Garland Publishing Company.
- Kari, James. 1979. Athabaskan Verb Theme Categories: Ahtna. Alaska Native Language Center Research Paper No. 2,
- Kari, James. 1981 (editor) Athabaskan Stories From Anvik, Rev. John W. Chapman's "Ten'a Tales". ANLC.
- Kari, James. 1986. Tatl'ahwt'aenn Nenn', The Headwaters People's Country, Narratives of the Upper Ahtna Athabaskans. Told by Katie John et al. Fairbanks: ANLC.
- Kari, James. 1987. (editor) Engthidong Xugixudhoy, Stories of Long Ago; Told by Belle Deacon. Fairbanks:ANLC. 127 pp
- Kari, James. 1990. Ahtna Athabaskan Dictionary. Fairbanks: ANLC.
- Kari, James. 1996.Ttheek'ädn Ut'iin Yaaniida' Oonign' , Old Time Stories of the Scottie Creek People. Told in Upper Tanana Athabaskan, by Mary Tyone. ANLC.
- Kari, James. (editor-in-chief). 2000. Koyukon Athabaskan Dictionary by Jules Jetté and Eliza Jones. ANLC.
- Kari, James. 2004 (editor) by Walter Johnson. Sukdu Neł Nuhtghelnek, I'll Tell You a Story, Stories I Recall From Growing up on Iliamna Lake. Fairbanks: Alaska Native Language Center. 81 pp with audio CD.
- Kari, James. 2005. Upper Inlet Dena'ina Language Lessons, by Sava Stephan. Alaska Native Heritage Center.
- Kari, James. 2007, 2011. Dena'ina Topical Dictionary. ANLC. 367 pp. Revised Edition [Reviewed in IJAL vol. 75:110-113 by Keren Rice.]
- Kari, James. 2008. (editor) Shtutda'ina Da'a Sheł Qudeł, My Forefathers are Still Walking with Me, Verbal Essays on Tsaynen and Qizhjeh Traditions. By Andrew Balluta. Anchorage: National Park Service.
- Kari, James. 2010. Ahtna Travel Narratives, a Demonstration of Shared Geographic Knowledge among Alaska Athabascans. Fairbanks: Alaska Native Language Center.
