= Soldotna High School =

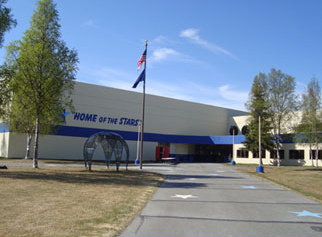

Location
- 425 W Marydale Ave; Soldotna, Alaska 99669; United States

Information
- Type: Comprehensive public high school
- School district: Kenai Peninsula Borough School District
- CEEB code: 020131
- Principal: Chip Abolafia
- Faculty: 41.56 ( FTE)
- Grades: 9–12
- Enrollment: 738 (2023–24)
- Student to teacher ratio: 17.76
- Colors: Navy and silver
- Team name: Stars
- Website: kpbsd.org/schools/soldotna-high/

Soldotna High School is a public high school serving grades 9–12 in Soldotna, Alaska, United States. The school's primary objective is to prepare students for college and career opportunities. The school colors are silver and blue, and the mascot is a star. Approximately 701students are currently enrolled. The school operates under the authority of the Kenai Peninsula Borough School District. The current principal is Tabitha Blades.

== Sports and activities ==
Sports offered include cross country running, swimming, football, cheerleading, cross country skiing, basketball, volleyball, wrestling, track and field, soccer, baseball, and softball. Activities offered include Drama, Swing Choir, Jazz Band, SkillsUSA, Student Council, National Honor Society, and After School Art Studio activities.

=== Football ===
In 2006 the school won its first small school football state championship over Kodiak. In 2007, they defended the championship again against Kodiak, the first time in Soldotna's 27-year history to go undefeated against all opposing schools. In 2008 the school again defended the championship by beating Kodiak 28-6. The school again went undefeated. In 2010 the school's football team again went undefeated and won the small school state football championship, this time beating longtime rival Kenai by a record-setting score. In 2015, the football team won their fourth-straight medium school state championship, against Kenai, and were undefeated for a state record 39 straight games. In 2016, Soldotna's team won their fifth-straight medium school state championship over Palmer High School, and reaching 49 straight games without a loss. This achievement placed the Stars third on USA Today's list of high school football winning streaks, and was voted as KTUU's number 2 sports story of 2016. Soldotna Football was also featured on Bleacher Report, highlighting the weather conditions in which the team plays. In 2018, after losing their first game of the year to a larger division I team on the last play of the game, ending their state record 59 game win streak. Soldotna Stars won their 7th straight division II State football championship that year.

=== Soccer ===
In 2024, the Soldotna High School boys' soccer team won the division 2 state championship. In 2018–2019, the Soldotna High School girls' soccer team took 2nd place at the state championship.

=== SkillsUSA ===
The Soldotna High School Chapter of SkillsUSA has hosted the last two district conferences. Soldotna's chapter has also had members serving as State Officers for the last nine years. Soldotna High School has won Quiz Bowl at the state conference in 2017, 2016, and 2014. Soldotna has had at least one member of their chapter attend the National Leadership and Skills Conference in Louisville, KY for the last 3 years.

== Notable alumni ==
- Marshall Boze, former MLB player (Milwaukee Brewers)
- Chris Mabeus, former MLB player (Milwaukee Brewers)
