= Justin Ruffridge =

American politician

- Ruffridge in 2023

Member of the Alaska House of Representatives
- Incumbent
- Assumed office January 17, 2023
- Preceded by: Ron Gillham
- Constituency: 7th district

Personal details
- Born: ca. 1983 (age 42–43) Council, Idaho, U.S.
- Party: Republican
- Education: Washington State University

Justin Ruffridge (born ca. 1983) is an American politician from Alaska serving as a member of the Alaska House of Representatives since 2023.

Ruffridge grew up on the Kenai and is a pharmacist by profession.

== Electoral history ==
=== 2024 ===
==== Primary ====
2024 Nonpartisan primary
Party	Candidate	Votes	%
Republican	Justin Ruffridge (incumbent)	1,630	59.7
Republican	Ron Gillham	1,101	40.3
Total votes		2,731	100.0

==== General ====
2024 Alaska House of Representatives election, District 7
Party	Candidate	Votes	%
Republican	Justin Ruffridge (incumbent)	4,985	58.9
Republican	Ron Gillham	3,398	40.2
Write-in		77	0.9
Total votes		8,460	100.0
Republican hold			
