= Alaskan Russians =

Ethnic group native to Alaska

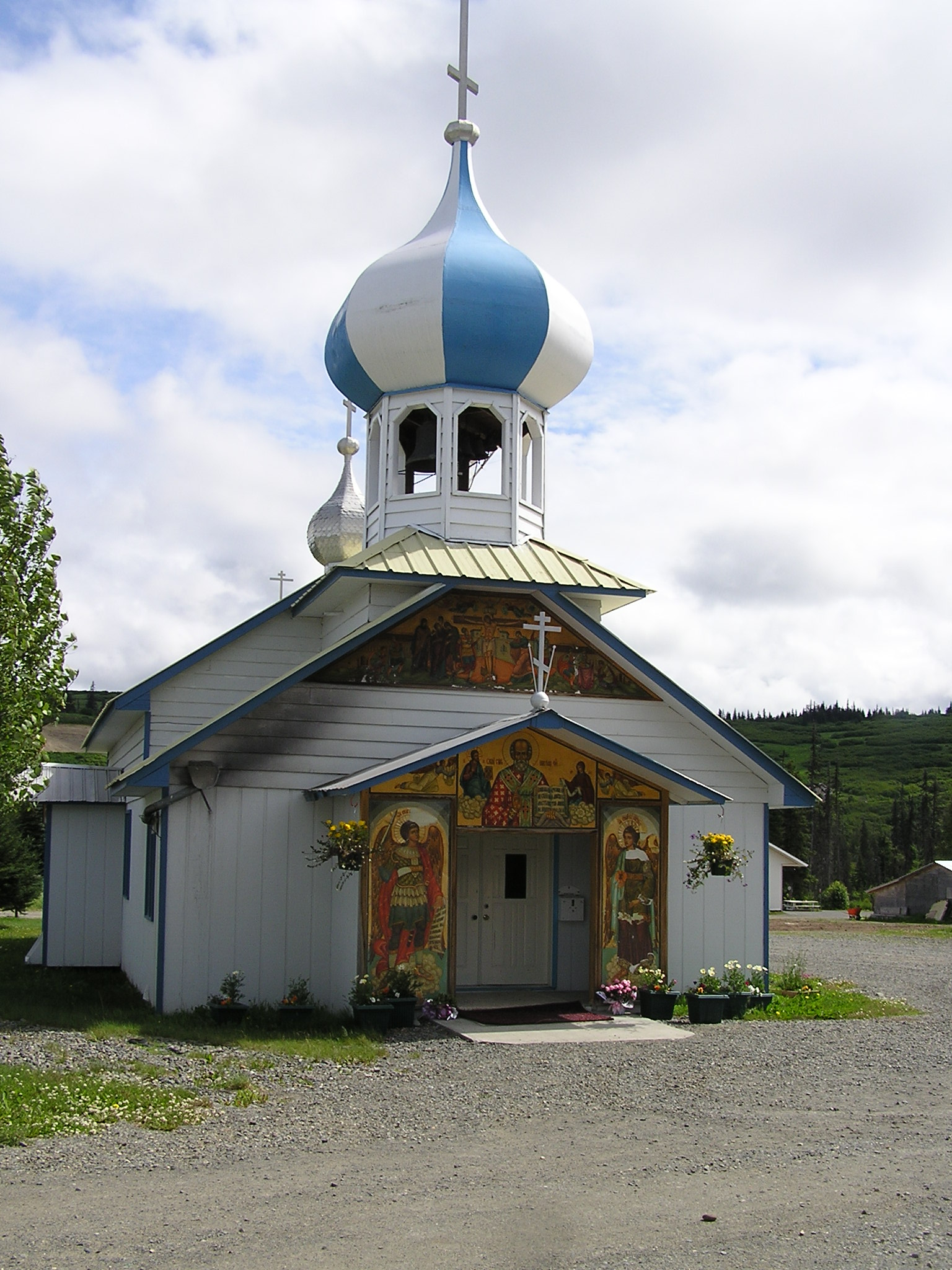
Russian Old Believers Church in Nikolaevsk

Alaskan Russians may refer to Alaskan Creole people, an ethnic group native to Alaska; or Old Believers, a community of religious Russians who settled in Alaska's Kenai Peninsula, notably Nikolaevsk; or Russian Americans in Alaska.

== Foreign Russians in Russian Alaska ==
The Russian-American Company was formed in 1799 with the influence of Nikolay Rezanov for the purpose of hunting sea otters for their fur.The number of foreign Russians (non-Alaskan Creoles) rarely exceeded 500 at any one time.

== Old Believers in Nikolaevsk ==
In May 2023, the Old Believers community of Nikolaevsk, Alaska, consisting of fr. Nikola Yakunin, his son Deacon Vasily Yakunin and about 20 families decided to join the Russian Orthodox Church Outside of Russia (semi-autonomous part of Moscow Patriarchate) on the rights of the edinoverie. It was reported that the community was largely americanized and it turned out to be problematic to pray in the already almost forgotten Church Slavonic language. They planned to build a new church for the community in Homer, near Nikolaevsk, because the old church will remain under the jurisdiction of the Russian Orthodox Old-Rite Church according to US law.
