= Loren Leman =

American politician (born 1950)

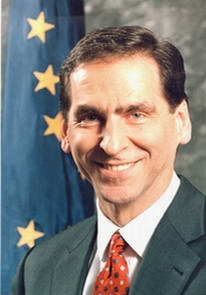
- Leman in 2003

8th Lieutenant Governor of Alaska
- In office December 2, 2002 – December 4, 2006
- Governor: Frank Murkowski
- Preceded by: Fran Ulmer
- Succeeded by: Sean Parnell

Member of the Alaska Senate from the G district
- In office December 1993 – December 2, 2002
- Preceded by: Pat Rodey
- Succeeded by: Hollis French

Member of the Alaska House of Representatives from the 9th district
- In office December 1989 - December 1993
- Preceded by: Drue Pearce
- Succeeded by: Cynthia Toohey

Personal details
- Born: Loren Dwight Leman; December 2, 1950 (age 75) Pomona, California, U.S.
- Party: Republican
- Spouse: Carolyn Rae Bratvold
- Education: Oregon State University, Corvallis; Stanford University; University of Alaska, Anchorage

Loren Dwight Leman (Russian: Лорен Дуайт Леман; born December 2, 1950) is an American politician who served as the eighth lieutenant governor of Alaska, from 2002 to 2006. Before that, he served in both houses of the state legislature, and was elected as the Senate Majority Leader by the end of his term. He served in office in electoral politics from 1989 to 2006. When Leman was elected as lieutenant governor in 2002, he was the first person of Alaska Native ancestry to be elected to statewide office in Alaska. He also has Russian-Polish ancestry.

== Early life and family ==
Leman was born in Pomona, California, and grew up in Ninilchik, Alaska, in a Russian-speaking family of Alutiiq, Russian Creole, and Polish ancestry. They were commercial fishermen. He watched his father operate a fish trap during Territorial days, before this fishing method was outlawed by referendum in 1959.

He subsequently has worked the family salmon setnet operation on Cook Inlet near Ninilchik. He longlined for halibut in Cook Inlet and harvested herring roe on kelp in Prince William Sound. Leman traces his long family history in Alaska to the marriage in Kodiak in 1798 between a Russian shipbuilder and an Alutiiq woman from Afognak.

He graduated from Ninilchik High School in 1968. He received his bachelor's degree in civil engineering from Oregon State University in 1972 and master's degree in civil/environmental engineering from Stanford University in 1973.

He and his wife Carolyn raised three children; Rachel, Joseph, and Nicole. Their younger daughter, Nicole, died in a hiking accident in New Zealand in December 2015.

== Political career ==
Leman joined the Republican Party in Alaska and became politically active. He was elected in 1988 to the Alaska state house, representing west Anchorage and serving until 1993. He was known as a social conservative, pro-development, pro-business, environmentally-conscious, a supporter of Alaska's military and taxpayer-friendly.

In 1992 he was elected to represent northwest Anchorage in the State Senate, serving from January 1993 to December 2002. In addition to other assignments, he chaired the Senate State Affairs, Labor & Commerce and Resources committees, and served on its Finance Committee. In his last term, he was elected as Senate Majority Leader.

== Lieutenant governor ==
In November 2002, Leman became the first person of Alaska Native ancestry to be elected to statewide office when he won the position of Alaska's eighth lieutenant governor. In the fall of 2002 Leman had campaigned to win the Republican nomination for lieutenant governor. His opponents were Gail Phillips, State Representative from Homer; Robin Taylor, State Senator from Wrangell; and Sarah Palin, who had been a mayor of Wasilla. Leman won. Palin was a close second, within 2,000 votes. She later ran for vice president on a ticket with Senator John McCain for president.

As lieutenant governor, Leman continued his interests in budget discipline, education accountability, promoting wise use of Alaska's natural resources, and supporting the right to life. Leman was an advocate for fiscal responsibility through adopting and following a five-year plan to reduce State spending by $250 million. A social conservative, he led efforts to require parental notification for girls seeking to have abortions and was a prime sponsor of a 1998 Alaska constitutional amendment that defined marriage as between one man and one woman.

He was active on the multi-state Energy Council, Pacific States Marine Fisheries Commission, and Pacific States Legislative Task Force. He taught the Alaska constitution and legislative process to Boys and Girls State delegates, "Winning Women" seminars, and has been a guest lecturer to high school and University of Alaska students.

During his four years as lieutenant governor, Leman led Alaska's Faith-Based & Community Initiatives, to develop synergies between government and Alaska's faith communities. After the initiative had been underway for a year, the White House recognized Alaska as a "role model State" for its FBCI achievements. Lieutenant Governor Leman spoke on the role of people of faith in politics and community service.

He represented the State as one of seven commissioners on the Denali Commission, a unique State-federal cooperative effort to improve health care, energy, transportation, economic opportunities and workforce development, primarily in rural Alaska.

There was speculation Leman might run for governor in 2006, either challenging Frank Murkowski in the primary or running for an open seat if Murkowski retired. Leman planned an announcement in February 2006, but postponed the news to talk more with his family about the decision. In late May 2006, Murkowski announced his plans to run for reelection. A few days later, Leman declined a run for the office (saying Murkowski's decision was only one of many factors) and also opted out of a second term as lieutenant governor. Republican Sean Parnell succeeded Leman.

Leman spoke at a pro-life event at the Alaska Capitol in 2018, stating "more and more people recognize that abortion is not a good solution. It doesn’t lead to happiness and fulfillment," and "we have lost 60 million people who could have made a difference in our world."

== Transportation improvements ==
Loren Leman has long maintained an avid interest in transportation improvements in Alaska. He has managed projects to improve airports, was an early supporter of the Alaska Aerospace Development Corporation's launch facilities on Kodiak, served on the board of directors of the Challenger Learning Center in Kenai, and as the national chairman of the Aerospace States Association, an organization of lieutenant governors and governor-appointed delegates from space ports and academia who advise Congress on aviation and space issues. He was a sponsor of legislation to enable the Alaska Railroad to complete a track realignment and improvement project from Ship Creek to Wasilla. He has championed road, port and harbor, and building improvements and served on the Legislature's Deferred Maintenance Task Force in the mid-1990s, identifying more than $1.4 billion in infrastructure improvement needs.

His other work history includes consulting civil/environmental engineering and fishing. A registered civil engineer in Alaska, Leman has had engineering work during the past 43 years that has spanned the entire State, from Ketchikan to Kotzebue, Unalaska to Wasilla to Yakutat.

== Legacy and honors ==
- In 1999 then-Senator Leman won the national Civil Government award from the American Society of Civil Engineers (ASCE), the world's premier civil engineering society, for his work in improving education, developing resources and improving transportation in Alaska.

== See also ==
- List of minority governors and lieutenant governors in the United States

Party political offices
| Preceded by Jerry Ward | Republican nominee for Lieutenant Governor of Alaska; 2002 | Succeeded by Sean Parnell |
Political offices
| Preceded by Fran Ulmer | Lieutenant governor of Alaska; 2002–2006 | Succeeded by Sean Parnell |
