= Happy Valley, Alaska =

Happy Valley, Alaska Shtuhtałent
- Census-designated place
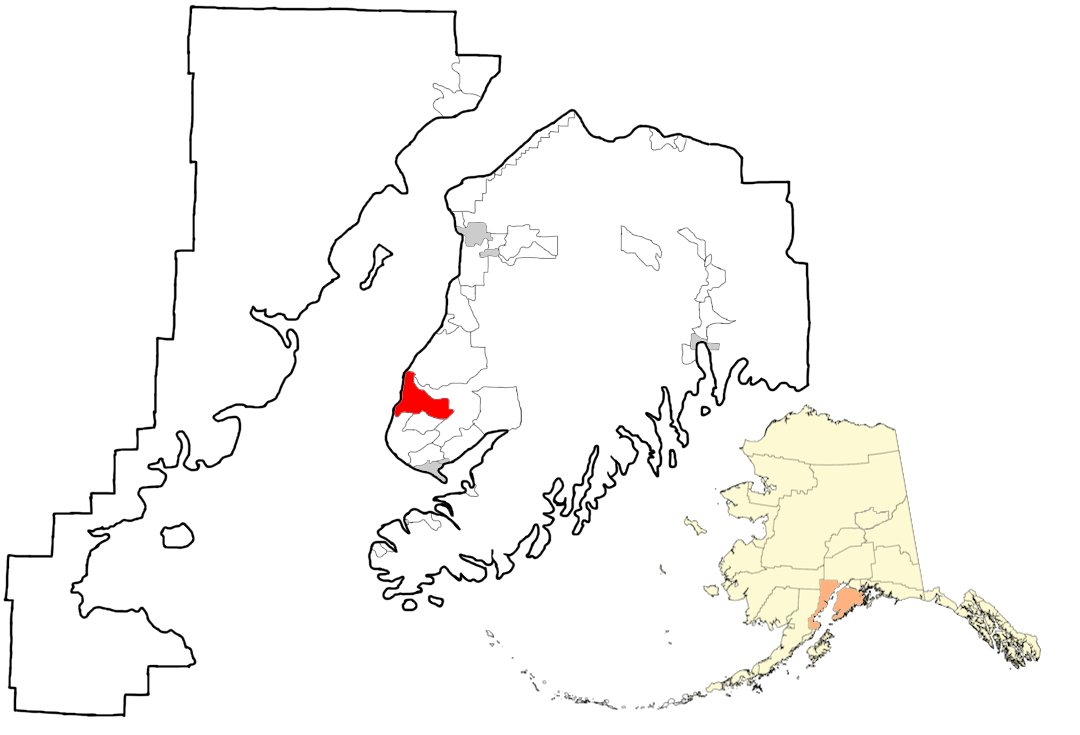
- Location in Kenai Peninsula Borough, Alaska
- Coordinates: 59°56′54″N 151°43′7″W
- Country: United States
- State: Alaska
- Borough: Kenai Peninsula

Government
  - Borough mayor: Peter Micciche
  - State senator: Gary Stevens (R)
  - State rep.: Sarah Vance (R)

Area
  - Total: 88.21 sq mi (228.45 km^{2})
  - Land: 88.20 sq mi (228.44 km^{2})
  - Water: 0.0039 sq mi (0.01 km^{2})
- Elevation: 135 ft (41 m)

Population (2020)
  - Total: 713
  - Density: 8.1/sq mi (3.12/km^{2})
- Time zone: UTC-9 (Alaska (AKST))
  - Summer (DST): UTC-8 (AKDT)
- Area code: 907
- FIPS code: 02-31710
- GNIS feature ID: 1866949

Happy Valley (Dena'ina: Shtuhtałent) is a census-designated place (CDP) in Kenai Peninsula Borough, Alaska, United States. As of the 2020 census, Happy Valley had a population of 713.

== Geography ==
Happy Valley is located on the western side of the Kenai Peninsula at 59°56′54″N 151°43′7″W (59.948424, -151.718711). It is bordered to the north by Ninilchik, to the south by Anchor Point and Nikolaevsk, and to the west by Cook Inlet. Alaska Route 1 (Sterling Highway) runs through the CDP close to the shore of Cook Inlet; it leads north 47 miles (76 km) to Soldotna and south 27 miles (43 km) to Homer.

According to the United States Census Bureau, the Happy Valley CDP has a total area of 88.2 square miles (228.4 km^{2}), of which 1.9 acres (7,802 m^{2}), or 0.003%, are water.

== Demographics ==
Historical population
Census	Pop.	Note	%±
1990	309		—
2000	489		58.3%
2010	593		21.3%
2020	713		20.2%
U.S. Decennial Census

Happy Valley first appeared on the 1990 U.S. Census as a census-designated place (CDP).

As of the census of 2000, there were 489 people, 196 households, and 131 families residing in the CDP. The population density was 5.5 inhabitants per square mile (2.1/km^{2}). There were 398 housing units at an average density of 4.5 per square mile (1.7/km^{2}). The racial makeup of the CDP was 88.34% White, 6.13% Native American, 0.41% Asian, 0.41% Pacific Islander, 0.82% from other races, and 3.89% from two or more races. 2.86% of the population were Hispanic or Latino of any race.

There were 196 households, out of which 28.1% had children under the age of 18 living with them, 57.1% were married couples living together, 4.6% had a female householder with no husband present, and 32.7% were non-families. 22.4% of all households were made up of individuals, and 6.1% had someone living alone who was 65 years of age or older. The average household size was 2.49 and the average family size was 2.94.

In the CDP, the population was spread out, with 22.3% under the age of 18, 8.4% from 18 to 24, 24.7% from 25 to 44, 31.5% from 45 to 64, and 13.1% who were 65 years of age or older. The median age was 42 years. For every 100 females, there were 118.3 males. For every 100 females age 18 and over, there were 122.2 males.

The median income for a household in the CDP was $30,139, and the median income for a family was $40,156. Males had a median income of $47,917 versus $20,469 for females. The per capita income for the CDP was $19,377. About 10.9% of families and 17.5% of the population were below the poverty line, including 28.2% of those under age 18 and 6.8% of those age 65 or over.
