= Ninilchik River =

Ninilchik River Niqnalchintnu
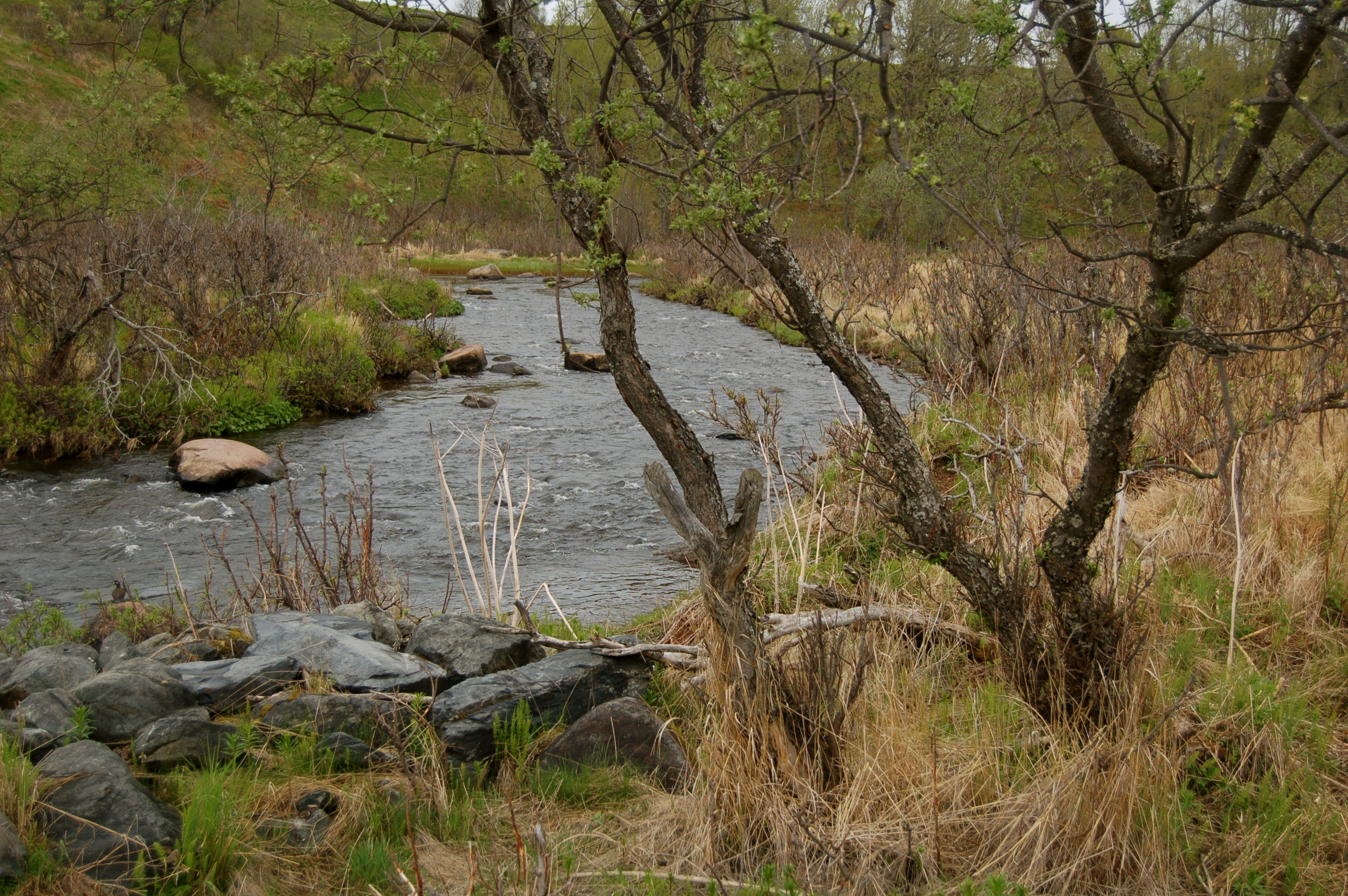
- Ninilchik River in Ninilchik, Alaska - June 3, 2011

- Location of the mouth of the Ninilchik River in Alaska
- Native name: Niqnalchintnu (Denaʼina)

Location
- Country: United States
- State: Alaska
- Borough: Kenai Peninsula

Physical characteristics
- Source: Kenai Peninsula
  - coordinates: 60°12′02″N 151°18′34″W
  - elevation: 275 ft (84 m)
- Mouth: Cook Inlet
  - location: Ninilchik, 38 miles (61 km) southwest of Kenai
  - coordinates: 60°03′27″N 151°39′36″W
  - elevation: 23 ft (7.0 m)
- Length: 21 mi (34 km)

The Ninilchik River (Dena'ina: Niqnalchintnu) is a 21-mile-long (34-kilometer) stream on the Kenai Peninsula of the U.S. state of Alaska. From headwaters near the west coast of the peninsula, the river flows south, parallel to the coast, then turns sharply west near Ninilchik. Ninilchik Road runs parallel to the lower river along its left bank to near the road's intersection with the Sterling Highway. At Ninilchik, the river passes under the highway, flows through Ninilchik State Recreation Area, and empties into Cook Inlet.

A small boat harbor, used mainly by fishing boats, is dredged out of the river mouth near the town. The river is a popular fishing location for king salmon in May and June, silver salmon and Dolly Varden in late summer and early fall, and steelhead in late fall. Digging for razor clams along the beaches near Ninilchik is also popular.

== See also ==
- List of rivers of Alaska
