= Ninilchik School =

High school in Alaska, United States

Coordinates: 60°02′36″N 151°40′32″W

Information
- Established: 1910; 116 years ago
- Grades: K-12

Ninilchik School is a K-12 school in Ninilchik, Alaska, serving the communities of Ninilchik, Anchor Point, Kasilof, and Clam Gulch. It is the oldest school on the Kenai Peninsula, originally opened in 1910. The principal is Terry Martin. In 2010 the school celebrated its centennial year with a community gathering and pig roast.

== Sports ==
The school is home to the highly successful Ninilchik Lady Wolverine basketball team of Ninilchik High School, which plays in District III, Region II. Owners of 8 state championships, the Lady Wolverines are recognized as one of the most successful basketball programs in the state.
