= Alaskan Creole people =

Ethnic group of Alaska

Alaskan Creoles
Креолы Аляски (Russian)
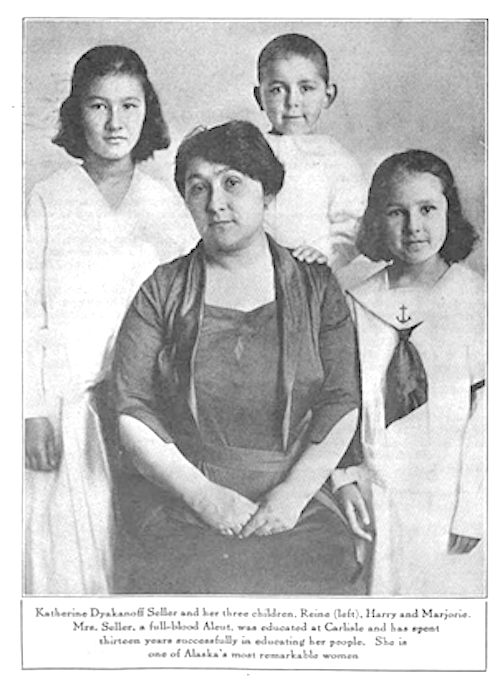
- Kathryn Dyakanoff, an Alaskan Creole educator, with her children.

Regions with significant populations
- Alaska; Aleutian Islands

Languages
- Alaskan Russian; Eskimo–Aleut languages; Alaskan English; Runglish; Mednyj Aleut language (Medny Island)

Religion
- Predominantly Russian Orthodox

Related ethnic groups
- Inuit, Siberians, Siberian Yupiks, Alaskan Yupiks, Aleuts, Russian Americans

Alaskan Creoles (Russian: Креолы Аляски, romanized: Kreoly Alyaski) are the descendants of ethnic Russians in colonial Alaska and the Commander Islands, known as Russian Creoles (Russian: Креолы, romanized: Kreoly), who intermarried with Aleut, Yupik, Inuit, and other Alaskan Native peoples.

== Russian Alaska ==
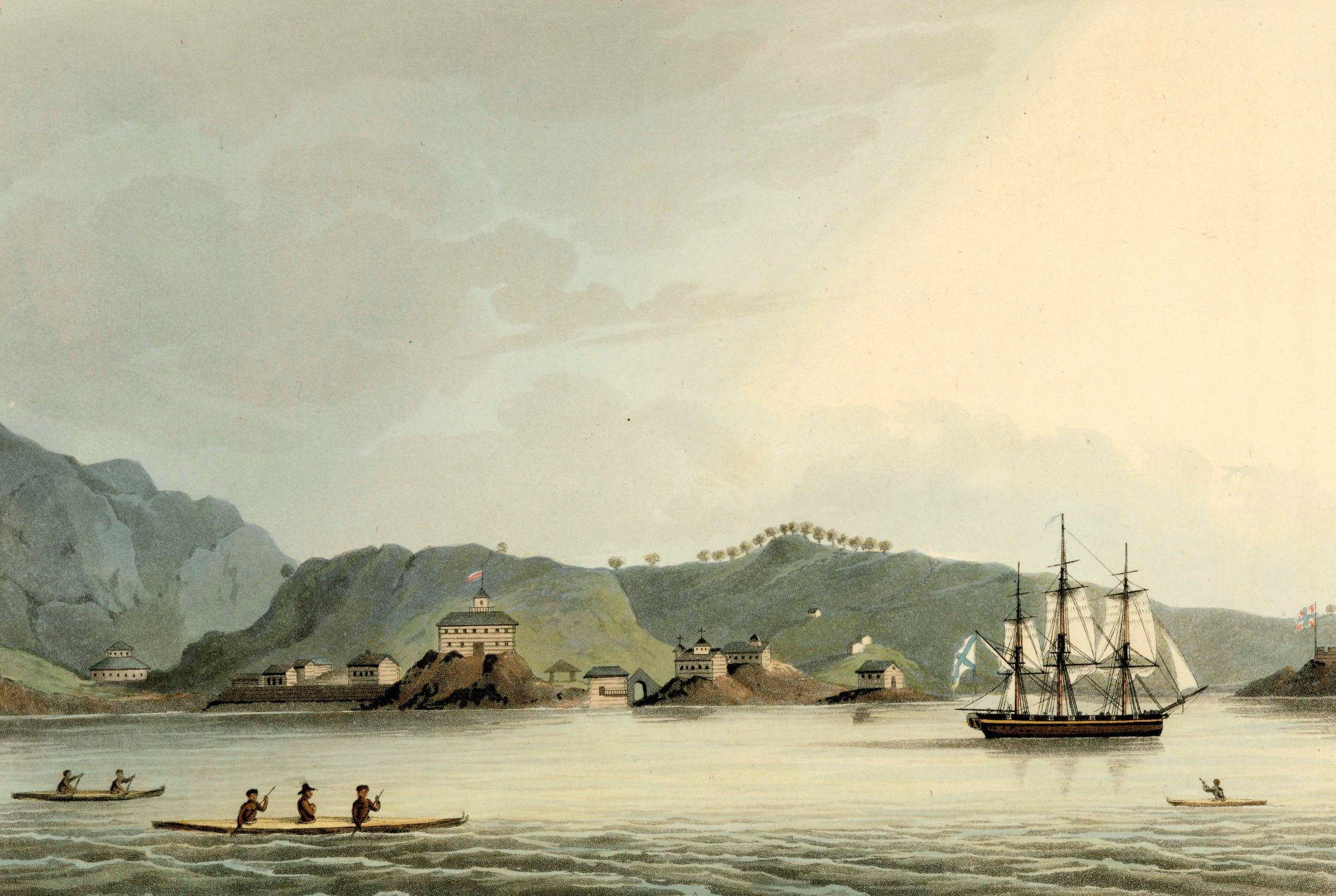
A Creole town in Kodiak, Alaska.

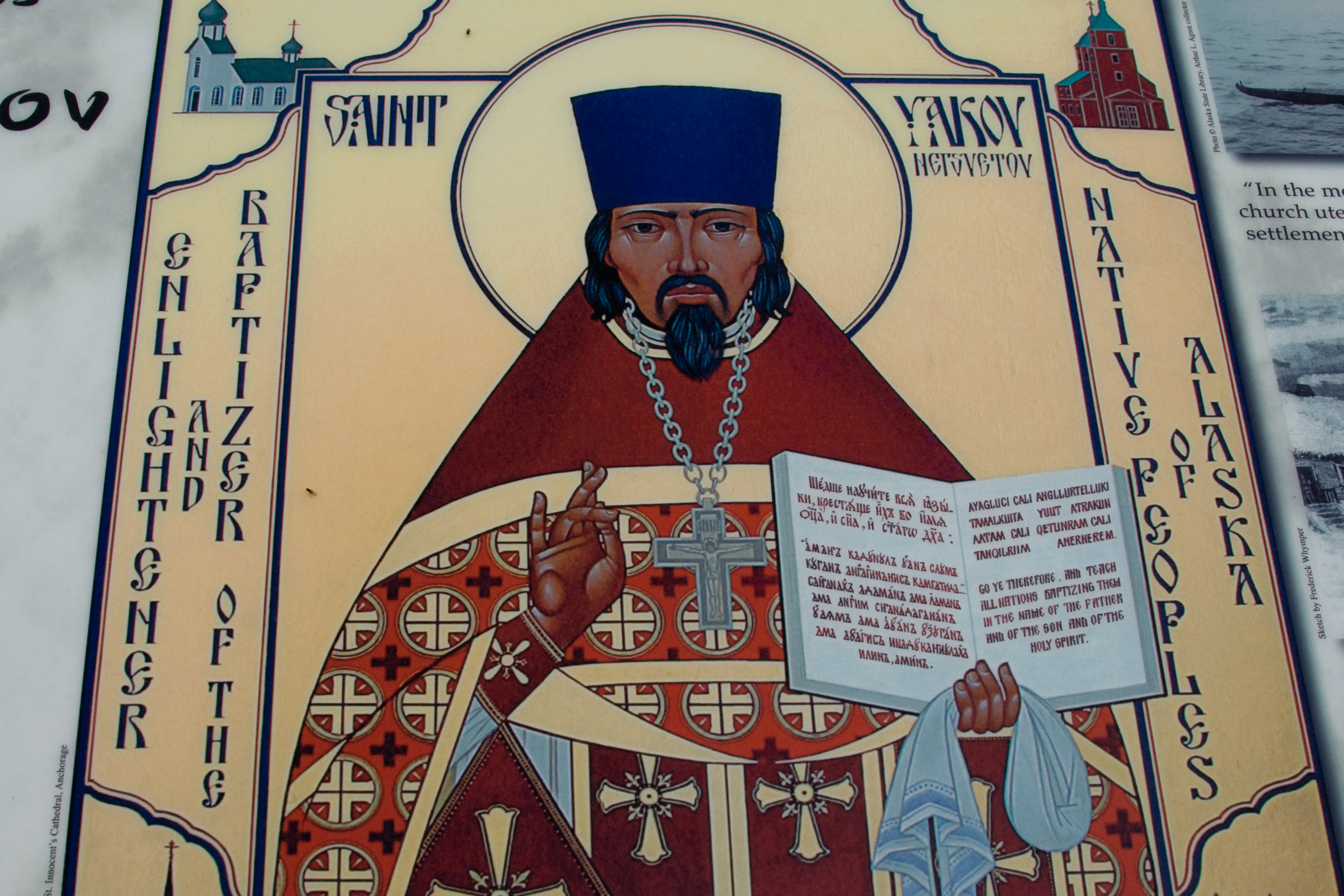
St. Jacob Netsvetov (1802-1864), Enlightener of Alaska.

In Russian Alaska, the term Creole was not a racial category, rather the designation of "colonial citizen" in the Russian Empire. Creoles constituted a privileged class in Alaska that could serve in the Russian military, had free education paid for by the colonial government, and had the opportunity of social mobility in both colonial Alaska and in the Russian Empire.

Creoles played an important role in Russian Alaska, as they managed colonial outposts and founded new Russian Creole towns. Their professions varied widely: they were teachers, clergy, navigators, cartographers, ship commanders, missionaries, hunters, interpreters, administrators and artists. The Creoles held a position of honor and respectability in colonial Alaska.

While many Creoles initially were the offspring of Sibero-Russian promyshlenniki (frontiersmen) who married native Alaskan women, the colonial government of Alaska made it possible for all Alaskan natives to become Creole if they pledged allegiance to the Alaskan government, thus becoming naturalized citizens. Being Creole was a matter of education, spirit, state of mind, and self-identity.

Creoles had tax-exemption from Imperial Russia if they stayed and lived at home in colonial Alaska; they were citizens of various Creole towns, such as the Alaskan capital of New Archangel (now Sitka, Alaska). Alaskan Creoles and natives were indiscernible except in that Creoles were more likely to dress in a Russian style.

Alaskan natives seeking free education and Creoles natively born in Alaska had access to free education by the colonial government; in exchange for free education, the colonial government required them to enlist in obligatory state and military service for at least ten years.

=== Society ===
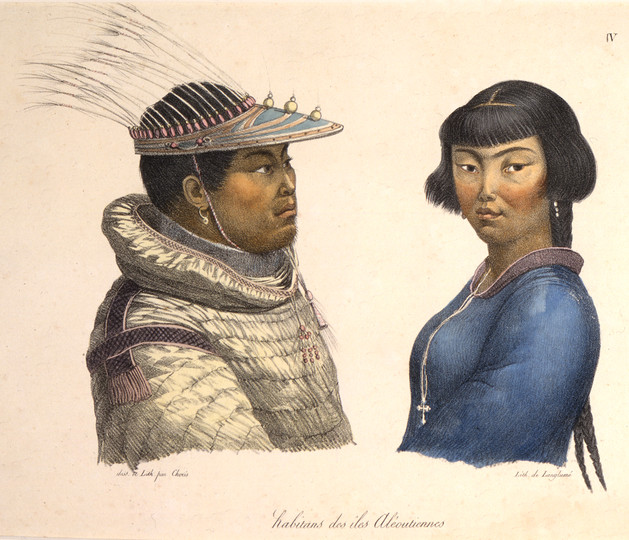
A man and woman of the Aleutian Islands.

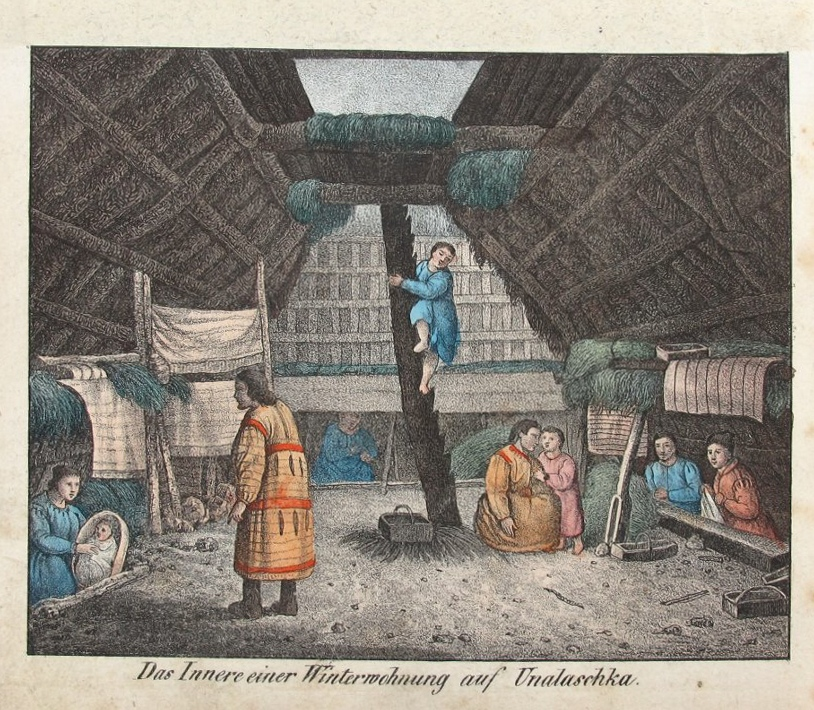
A Creole winter home in Unalaska, Aleutian Islands.

The development of arts, architecture, and music during the Russian period combined traditional Alaska Native techniques with Old Russian culture derived from the Byzantine Church. Cross-cultural borrowings were the characteristic of the period; an example of this cross-cultural borrowing was the Alaskan celebration of Christmas incorporating traditional masked performances.

Alaskan Russian society was characterized by multilingualism and multiculturalism. Generally three languages were used: Church Slavonic was used for religion; for official and educational purposes, Russian was used; Alaska Native languages were used for colloquial purposes. Specific usage of each language depended on the locale within Alaska; in many regions of colonial Alaska, Russian was spoken as a colloquial language as much as Alaska Native languages, and Alaska Native languages were spoken during religious service for liturgy and songs.

Alaskan Creoles spoke Russian and their local Alaska Native language; they could read and write both. Creoles also maintained Alaska Native traditions and continued native hunting methods using traditional weapons.

After the Alaska Purchase, the multilingual-multicultural Alaskan society continued; English became increasingly important as more Americans immigrated to Alaska. In 1898 for example, Vladmir Modestov, a priest of the Russian Church, took a Creole boy named Iakov Orlov to San Francisco both to improve his Russian and to learn English; Modestov remarked that English "is becoming essential even in the North of Alaska".

=== Exploration ===
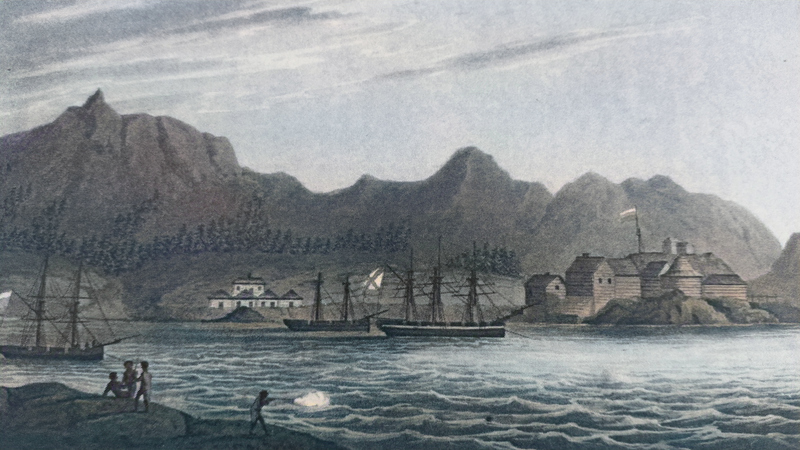
New Archangel (Sitka) in 1805

The government of colonial Alaska frequently collected geographical data through expeditions led by Creole scientists and ship commanders. Creole explorers also made expeditions into the interior of Alaska to connect and trade with uncontacted native tribes and to introduce them to Christianity. Alaskan Russian explorations made great advancements in the 1820s and 1840s, such as the expeditions of Vasilyev (1829), Glazunov (1833), Ivan Malakhov (1832–1839) and Zagokin (1842–1844).

Tebenkhov, a Creole printer and citizen of New Archangel, compiled all of the data of these expeditions into a scientific atlas titled "Atlas of the Northwest Coasts of America" in 1852. Tebenkhov's atlas served as a navigational aid for sailing through Alaskan territory and it became the basis of American cartography in Alaska for decades after the sale of Alaska.

== Sale of Alaska, 1867 ==
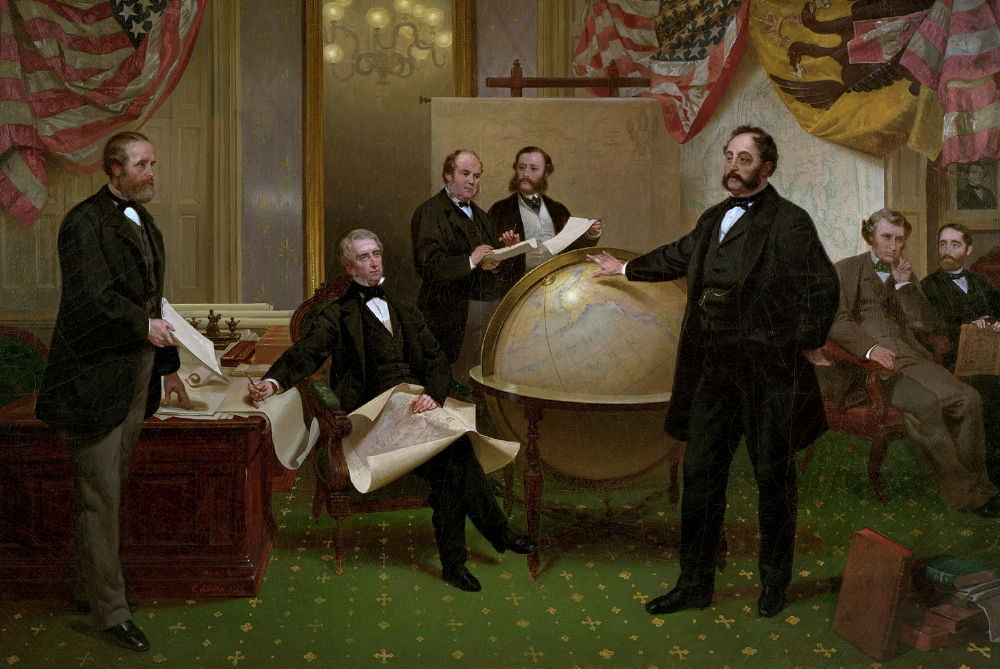
The signing of the Treaty of Alaskan Cession between the United States of America and Imperial Russia.

When the United States of America purchased Alaska from the Russian Empire in 1867, the Creoles became disenfranchised. Americans looked down on Creoles with contempt because they associated the term "Creole" with the meaning of "mixed race".

In New Archangel (Sitka), after the colonial government transferred sovereignty to the American forces, the Creoles of the town were amazed by the American soldiers. Creole officials, farmers, and employees all opened their homes to the Americans with full Russian hospitality; in many instances the Americans committed robberies and assaults on Creoles overnight. The Creoles of Sitka were eventually compelled to begin locking their doors to protect themselves from the Americans.

Having lost their social status under American rule, Alaskan Creoles began to look back on Alaska's colonial period as the golden age of their civilization.

=== Property seizures by the Federal government ===
In the Treaty of Alaskan Cession, Alaskan Creoles were guaranteed the choice to either become American citizens, with full protections of property and liberty, or to emigrate to Russian territory. The Americans ignored the guarantee for the majority of Creoles; only the property of the Russian Orthodox Church and its legal rights were fully protected.

The American government gave guarantee certificates to only 20 Alaskan Creoles. In the hour that the transfer of Alaska took place, the Alaskans lost all rights to their land and property. Some Creoles were listed on a registry that mentioned their ownership of a house, but they lost all rights to their land. All properties on the island of Kodiak were transferred immediately to the United States federal government.

The property transfer in Alaska was enacted rapidly and harshly. U.S. Brigadier General Davis, who oversaw the transfer on Baranof Island, remarked: "The Russians hurried to clear all buildings designated for transfer to the American government. This speedy relinquishment of the best dwellings caused considerable inconvenience to the chief administrator and to those people who had to get out of their houses under the local rainy weather, the majority of them moving to ships."

A Tlingit chief of Baranof island, witnessing the property transfer, angrily remarked: "We indeed permitted the Russians to administer the island, but we have no intention to give it to any and every fellow who comes along".

== American Alaska ==
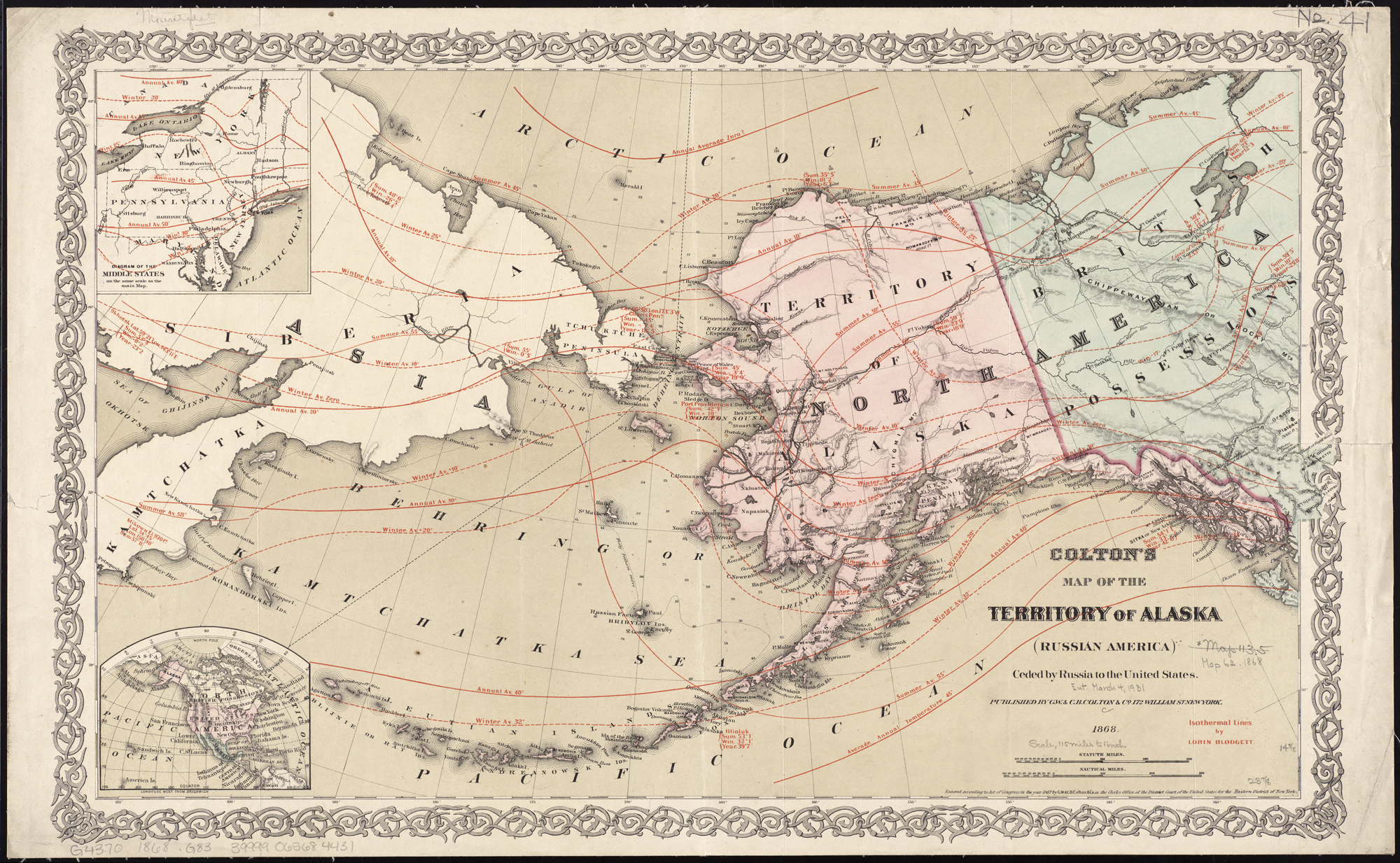
A map of the U.S. Department of Alaska, 1868

The Alaskan colonial government stipulated three years to transport any Russian subjects who wanted to remain in the Russian Empire. The American government then began a program to Americanize the Creoles and Alaskan natives. They opened English schools and began the process of Americanization in Alaska.

We, the undersigned, citizens of the United States, do hereby memorialize to appropriate from the revenue of Alaska in the Treasury the sum of $50,000, for the establishment of schools for the instruction of the native population and creoles of Alaska in the English language, the common branches of an English education, the principles of a republican government, and such industrial pursuits as may seem best adapted to their circumstances.

Not all Alaskan Russians who wanted to leave could take advantage of the three-year grace period to evacuate Alaska; in 1869, only two years after the sale of Alaska, Alaska's colonial government lost all rights to act in Alaska, and had to entirely abandon the Creoles without any government support.

=== Forced labor and enfranchisement ===
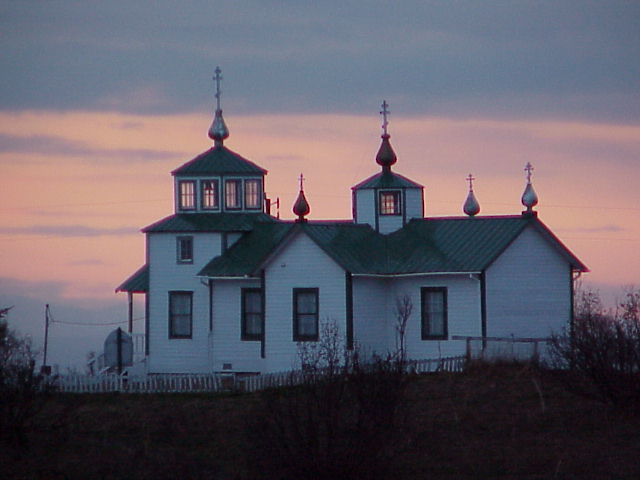
Ninilchik, Alaska.

Disenfranchised Creoles were forced to work under U.S. military supervisors appointed by the federal government, and their situation became increasingly desperate. An American observer recorded this desperation: "As often happens under such harsh systems, the people lose any sense of responsibility for themselves that they used to have, their intellectual powers atrophy more and more and they sink into a state of animal apathy, knowing all too well that they will have their piece of daily bread and will gain nothing more in the future, no matter how hard they try to work".

Alaskan Creoles were eventually enfranchised. The following is a passage from Alaska's governor in 1885 considering enfranchisement of Creoles in the Aleutian Islands:

The brightest among the creoles and Aleutian boys were carefully trained in navigation, ship building, and the mechanical arts, while the girls were taught housekeeping, and thus fitted to become wives, and I am reliably informed by old Russian residents that there are now in the Russian army and navy officers of very considerable rank, and a good many who hold high positions in the civil service of the Empire, who are the progeny of creoles. My most reliable information is to the effect that the Aleuts are a keen, bright, and naturally intelligent people, industrious and provident, the larger portions being educated to a greater or less extent in the Russian language, and that they are well advanced in civilization is evidenced by the fact that they live in comfortable houses, are given to finery in their dress, and are, with scarcely an exception, devout members of the Russian Orthodox Church. So far, therefore, as these peoples are concerned, I do not hesitate in my opinion as to the consideration to which they are justly entitled, politically or otherwise. They are fully competent to comprehend and discharge the duties of intelligent citizenship.

=== Language ===
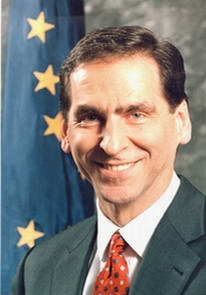
Lieutenant Governor Loren Leman of Ninilchik.

As of 2010, some descendants of Creoles still spoke Alaskan Russian on Kodiak Island and in the village of Ninilchik (Kenai Peninsula), Alaska, where it had been isolated from other varieties of Russian for over a century.

== Notable people ==
- Loren Leman, Lieutenant Governor of Alaska
- Jacob Netsvetov (1802–1864), "Enlightener of Alaska", saint of the Russian Orthodox Church in Alaska
- Peter the Aleut (d. 1815), martyr and saint of the Eastern Orthodox Church
- Kathryn Dyakanoff Seller (1884–1980), educator
