= Nikolaevsk, Alaska =

Census-designated place in Alaska, U.S.

Nikolaevsk, Alaska Николаевск (Russian)
- Census-designated place
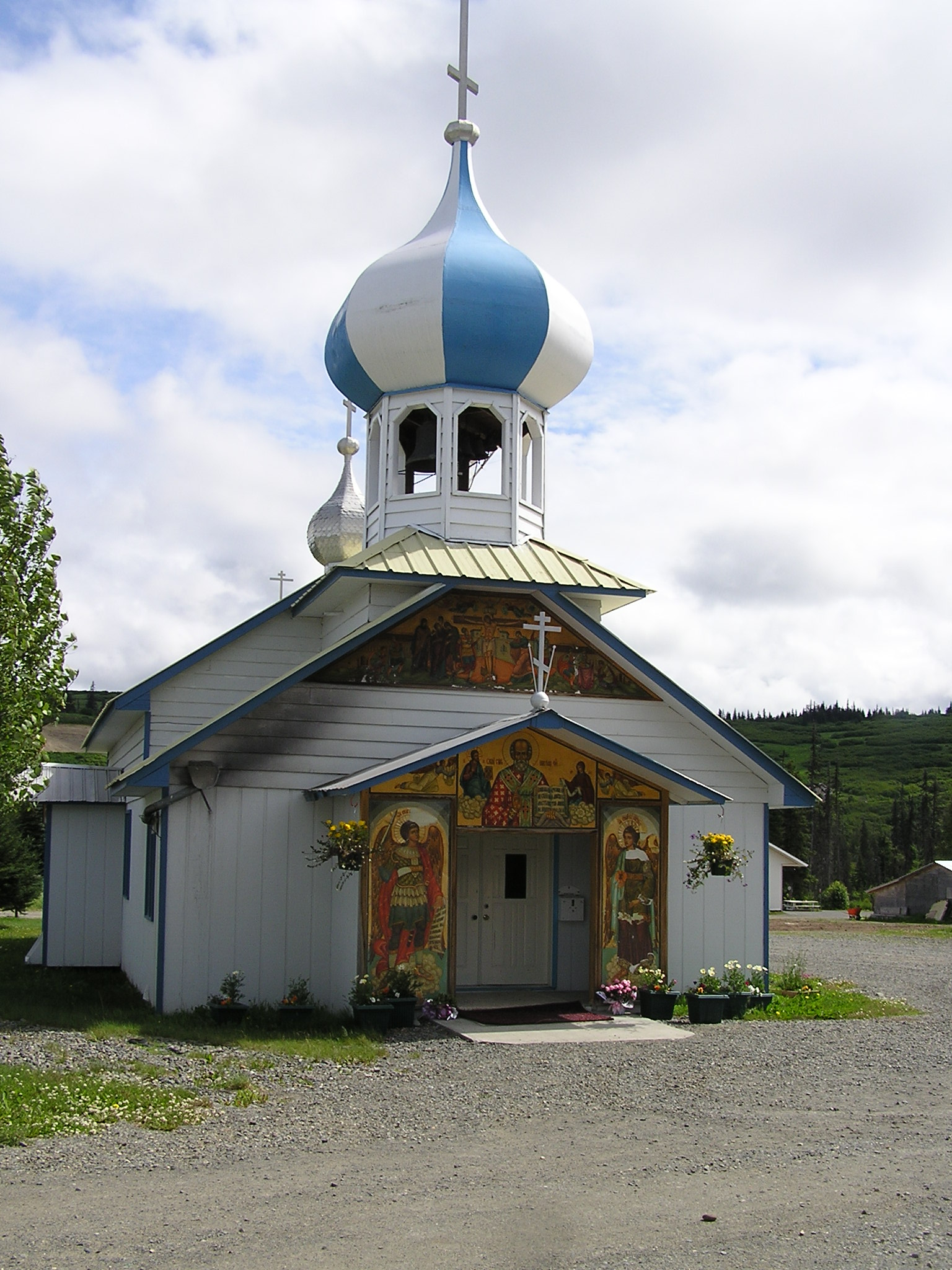
- Russian Old Believers Church in Nikolaevsk

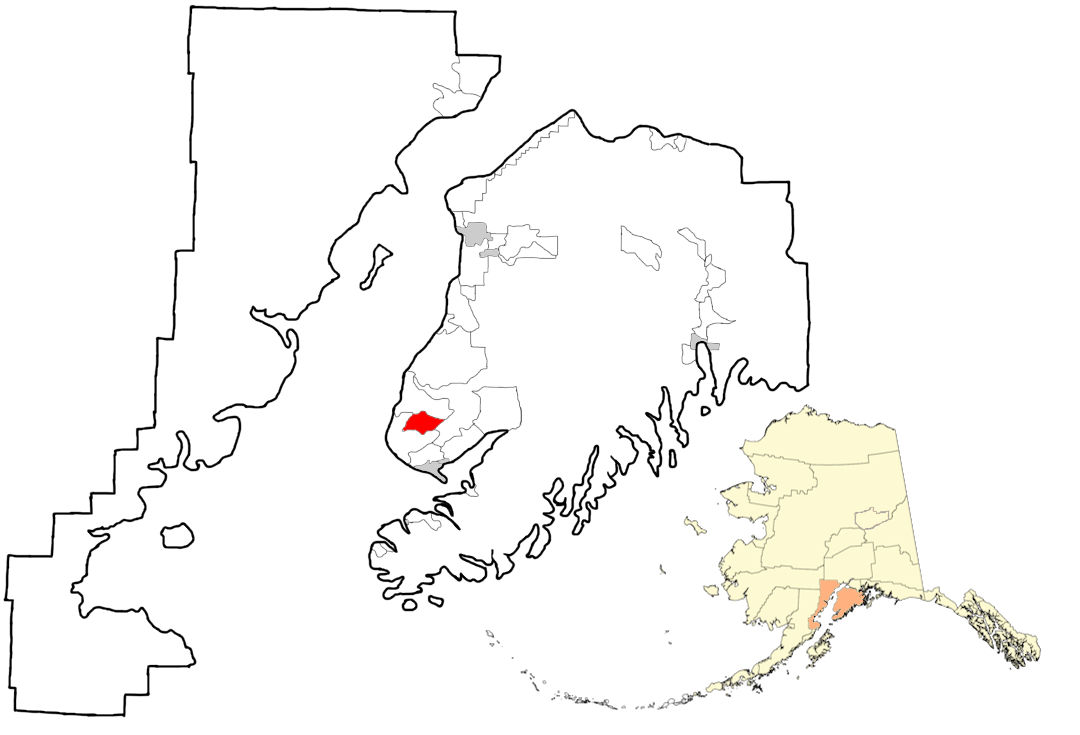
- Location in Kenai Peninsula Borough, Alaska
- Coordinates: 59°48′43″N 151°36′36″W
- Country: United States
- State: Alaska
- Borough: Kenai Peninsula
- Founded: 1968

Government
  - Borough mayor: Peter Micciche
  - State senator: Gary Stevens (R)
  - State rep.: Sarah Vance (R)

Area
  - Total: 34.85 sq mi (90.25 km^{2})
  - Land: 34.85 sq mi (90.25 km^{2})
  - Water: 0 sq mi (0.00 km^{2})
- Elevation: 840 ft (256 m)

Population (2020)
  - Total: 328
  - Density: 9.4/sq mi (3.63/km^{2})
- Time zone: UTC-9 (Alaska (AKST))
  - Summer (DST): UTC-8 (AKDT)
- ZIP code: 99556
- Area code: 907
- FIPS code: 02-54085
- GNIS feature ID: 1417063

Nikolaevsk (Russian: Никола́евск, IPA: [nʲɪkɐˈɫa(j)ɪfsk]) is a census-designated place (CDP) in Kenai Peninsula Borough in the U.S. state of Alaska. As of the 2020 census, the population of the CDP is 328, up from 318 in 2010.

== History ==
Nikolaevsk was founded by five families of Russian Orthodox Old Believers from Siberia who left Russia after the Russian Revolution, and lived near Harbin, China, and São Paulo, Brazil, before moving to the United States. Initially living in Woodburn, Oregon, the community came to Alaska in 1968, seeking a more isolated location. Nikolaevsk was built from 1968 to 1970. The group's travels, as well as the story of the founding of Nikolaevsk, is told in a 1972 article in National Geographic, a 2013 episode on the NatGeo channel called Russian Alaska, and a 2013 article in The Atlantic magazine.

The first church was built in 1983. The second church was constructed in 2014.

In May 2023, it became known that the Old Believers community of Nikolaevsk, Alaska, consisting of Fr. Nikola Yakunin, his son Deacon Vasily Yakunin, and about 20 families decided to join the Russian Orthodox Church Outside of Russia (semi-autonomous part of Moscow Patriarchate) on the rights of the edinoverie. It was reported that the community was largely Americanized and was having problems praying in the already almost forgotten Church Slavonic language.

At present, the town's residents are predominantly ethnic Russians.

== Geography ==
Nikolaevsk is on the west side of the Kenai Peninsula at 59°48′47″N 151°40′6″W (59.813043, -151.668387). It is bordered to the south and west by the Anchor Point CDP and to the north by the Happy Valley CDP. Road access is via the North Fork Road, which junctions with the Sterling Highway 9 miles (14 km) to the west in Anchor Point.

According to the United States Census Bureau, the CDP has a total area of 34.8 square miles (90.2 km^{2}), all of it recorded as land. The North Fork of the Anchor River forms the southern border of the community, and the Chakok River forms the western border.

Nikolaevsk is in the boreal wet forest biome, according to the Holdridge life zones system.

== Climate ==
Nikolaevsk features a subarctic climate (Köppen: Dfc) with short, quite mild summers and long, cold winters. Nikolaevsk experiences a significant marine influence.

Homer 8 NW, a weather station near Nikolaevsk, is located at an elevation of 1080 ft (329 m).

Climate data for Homer 8 NW, Alaska, 1991-2020 normals, 1977-2020 extremes: 1080ft (329m)
Month	Jan	Feb	Mar	Apr	May	Jun	Jul	Aug	Sep	Oct	Nov	Dec	Year
Record high °F (°C)	53 (12)	52 (11)	54 (12)	67 (19)	76 (24)	79 (26)	81 (27)	82 (28)	69 (21)	59 (15)	51 (11)	46 (8)	82 (28)
Mean maximum °F (°C)	40.5 (4.7)	41.7 (5.4)	44.3 (6.8)	51.8 (11.0)	64.5 (18.1)	69.3 (20.7)	70.8 (21.6)	69.1 (20.6)	61.0 (16.1)	52.4 (11.3)	43.2 (6.2)	40.0 (4.4)	73.2 (22.9)
Mean daily maximum °F (°C)	28.1 (−2.2)	30.7 (−0.7)	32.9 (0.5)	41.8 (5.4)	50.9 (10.5)	57.2 (14.0)	60.5 (15.8)	59.6 (15.3)	52.7 (11.5)	41.9 (5.5)	32.6 (0.3)	29.1 (−1.6)	43.2 (6.2)
Daily mean °F (°C)	23.2 (−4.9)	25.5 (−3.6)	26.9 (−2.8)	35.5 (1.9)	43.6 (6.4)	49.8 (9.9)	53.8 (12.1)	53.0 (11.7)	46.7 (8.2)	36.7 (2.6)	27.7 (−2.4)	24.5 (−4.2)	37.2 (2.9)
Mean daily minimum °F (°C)	18.3 (−7.6)	20.4 (−6.4)	20.8 (−6.2)	29.2 (−1.6)	36.4 (2.4)	42.4 (5.8)	47.0 (8.3)	46.4 (8.0)	40.7 (4.8)	31.5 (−0.3)	22.9 (−5.1)	19.9 (−6.7)	31.3 (−0.4)
Mean minimum °F (°C)	−1.2 (−18.4)	3.4 (−15.9)	4.9 (−15.1)	17.1 (−8.3)	28.5 (−1.9)	35.5 (1.9)	40.6 (4.8)	39.1 (3.9)	30.8 (−0.7)	18.8 (−7.3)	8.8 (−12.9)	4.1 (−15.5)	−4.9 (−20.5)
Record low °F (°C)	−30 (−34)	−19 (−28)	−6 (−21)	−2 (−19)	19 (−7)	29 (−2)	32 (0)	31 (−1)	19 (−7)	2 (−17)	−12 (−24)	−17 (−27)	−30 (−34)
Average precipitation inches (mm)	2.08 (53)	1.88 (48)	1.24 (31)	1.41 (36)	1.24 (31)	1.57 (40)	2.33 (59)	3.26 (83)	4.56 (116)	3.63 (92)	3.19 (81)	3.34 (85)	29.73 (755)
Average snowfall inches (cm)	17.60 (44.7)	17.20 (43.7)	13.30 (33.8)	6.50 (16.5)	0.60 (1.5)	0.00 (0.00)	0.00 (0.00)	0.00 (0.00)	0.60 (1.5)	4.70 (11.9)	13.70 (34.8)	26.40 (67.1)	100.6 (255.5)
Average precipitation days (≥ 0.01 in)	12.8	11.6	10.1	10.3	11.8	12.5	14.1	16.3	18.0	16.3	13.6	16.0	163.4
Average snowy days (≥ 0.1 in)	10.1	9.4	8.9	4.2	0.8	0.0	0.0	0.0	0.3	2.9	7.9	12.3	56.8
Source 1: NOAA
Source 2: XMACIS2 (records & monthly max/mins)

== Demographics ==
Historical population
Census	Pop.	Note	%±
1990	371		—
2000	345		−7.0%
2010	318		−7.8%
2020	328		3.1%
U.S. Decennial Census

Nikolaevsk first reported on the 1990 U.S. Census as a census-designated place (CDP).

Largest ancestries (2000)	Percent
Russian	67.5%
German	7.5%
English	7.2%
Irish	3.6%
French	2.6%
Dutch	1.0%
Hungarian	1.0%
Swedish	1.0%
American	1.0%

Languages (2000)	Percent
Spoke Russian at home	66.57%
Spoke English at home	33.43%
Spoke English "not well" or "not at all."	5.52%

As of the census of 2000, there were 345 people, 96 households, and 72 families residing in the CDP. The population density was 9.5 inhabitants per square mile (3.7/km^{2}). There were 122 housing units at an average density of 3.4 per square mile (1.3/km^{2}). The racial makeup of the CDP was 81.74% Caucasian, 1.74% Native American, 0.29% Asian, 1.16% Pacific Islander, 2.03% from other races, 13.04% from two or more races, and 0.29% of the population were Hispanic or Latino of any race.

Out of the 96 households, 57.3% had children under the age of 18 living with them, 65.6% were married couples living together, 5.2% had a female householder with no husband present, and 24.0% were non-families. 18.8% of all households were made up of individuals, and 2.1% had someone living alone who was 65 years of age or older. The average household size was 3.59 and the average family size was 4.33.

In the CDP, the population was spread out, with 45.2% under the age of 18, 7.8% from 18 to 24, 26.4% from 25 to 44, 17.1% from 45 to 64, and 3.5% who were 65 years of age or older. The median age was 21 years. For every 100 females, there were 104.1 males. For every 100 females age 18 and over, there were 119.8 males.

The median income for a household in the CDP was $42,625, and the median income for a family was $39,375. Males had a median income of $28,750 versus $10,956 for females. The per capita income for the CDP was $10,390. About 15.8% of families and 19.2% of the population were below the poverty line, including 20.9% of those under age 18 and 16.7% of those age 65 or over.

== Culture and lifestyle ==
Daily life in Nikolaevsk has historically centered on the preservation of pre-17th-century Russian Orthodox traditions and strict adherence to the Julian calendar.

- Traditional clothing: Community members observe traditional modesty rules in attire. Men and boys typically wear brightly colored, untucked tunic shirts (rubakha) embroidered at the collar and hem, secured at the waist with woven fabric belts (poyas), and adult men maintain untrimmed beards. Women and girls wear modest ankle-length dresses (talianka or sarafan). Upon marriage, women conceal their hair beneath a small bonnet (shashmura) draped with a scarf (platok).
- Linguistic practice: The settlement has traditionally operated across three linguistic registers: archaic Old Church Slavonic is reserved exclusively for liturgical prayer and liturgical song; colloquial Russian serves as the domestic and familial language; and English is used for commerce, secular schooling, and interactions with outside institutions. Over recent decades, younger generations have experienced a significant shift toward English as their primary language.
- Religious and domestic customs: Traditional households observe extensive fasting calendars, avoiding meat and dairy products during designated seasons such as Great Lent and the Nativity Fast. Strict separation practices historically extended to tableware and eating utensils to prevent contamination by guests outside the faith, though degree of enforcement varies significantly among households.

== Economy ==
Although Nikolaevsk was initially settled as an agrarian community, residents rapidly adapted to coastal Alaska's maritime economy. Commercial fishing emerged as the primary source of cash income, with fishermen operating vessels targeting salmon and halibut in Cook Inlet, Prince William Sound, and Bristol Bay. In addition to crew work and vessel ownership, many residents work seasonally at regional shore-based fish processing plants in Homer and Kenai.

The community developed a regional reputation for skilled trades, particularly maritime manufacturing and shipwright work. Drawing on woodworking skills developed during earlier migrations, builders in Nikolaevsk transitioned to custom fiberglass and aluminum commercial fishing vessels tailored for Alaskan marine conditions. Local businesses and home-based enterprises include carpentry, general construction, automotive mechanics, subsistence hunting and berry harvesting, and traditional handicrafts such as weaving and embroidery.

== Education ==
Nikolaevsk is served by the Kenai Peninsula Borough School District. The Nikolaevsk School is a public K–12 facility that accommodates local students, incorporating cultural sensitivity to religious holiday calendars alongside the standard state curriculum. High-school athletics have historically centered on basketball and track programs.

== Weblinks ==
- youtube.com - "50 hours in a Secret Russian town in America" (Nikolaevsk)
