= Alaskan Russian =

Russian of southwestern Alaska

- Old Russian
- The flag of Alaska.
- Native to: Alaska
- Region: Kodiak Island (Afognak), Ninilchik
- Ethnicity: Alaskan Creoles
- Language family: Indo-European: Balto-Slavic; Slavic; East Slavic; Russian; Alaskan Russian
- Dialects: Kodiak; Ninilchik
- Writing system: Cyrillic, Latin

Language codes
- ISO 639-3: –
- Glottolog: kodi1252 Kodiak Creole Russian nini1236 Ninilchik
- ELP: Kodiak Russian Creole
- IETF: ru-u-sd-usak

Alaskan Russian, known locally as Old Russian, is a dialect of Russian, influenced by Eskimo–Aleut languages, spoken in what is now the U.S. state Alaska since the Russian colonial period. Today it is prevalent on Kodiak Island and in Ninilchik (Kenai Peninsula), Alaska; it has been isolated from other varieties of Russian for over a century.

== Dialects ==
Kodiak Russian was natively spoken on Afognak Strait until the Great Alaskan earthquake and tsunami of 1964. It is now moribund, spoken by only a handful of elderly people, and is virtually undocumented.

Ninilchik Russian is better studied and more vibrant; it developed from the Russian colonial settlement of Ninilchik in 1847.

== Phonology ==
As it has been isolated from other varieties of Russian for nearly two centuries, Alaskan Russian has developed its own distinctive phonology.

=== Consonants ===
⟨ʲ⟩ denotes palatalization, meaning the center of the tongue is raised during and after the articulation of the consonant.

Consonant phonemes
		Bilabial	Labiodental	Dental		Post- alveolar	Retroflex	Palatal	Velar
Nasal		m		n					
Plosive	voiceless	p		t	tʲ				k
Plosive	voiced	b		d	dʲ				ɡ
Affricate				t͡s		t͡ʃʲ			
Fricative	voiceless		f	s			ʂ		x
Fricative	voiced		f	z			ʐ		x
Approximant		w		l				j	(w)
Trill				r					

== Vocabulary ==
Ninilchik Russian vocabulary is distinctly Russian, with a few borrowings from English and Alaskan native languages.

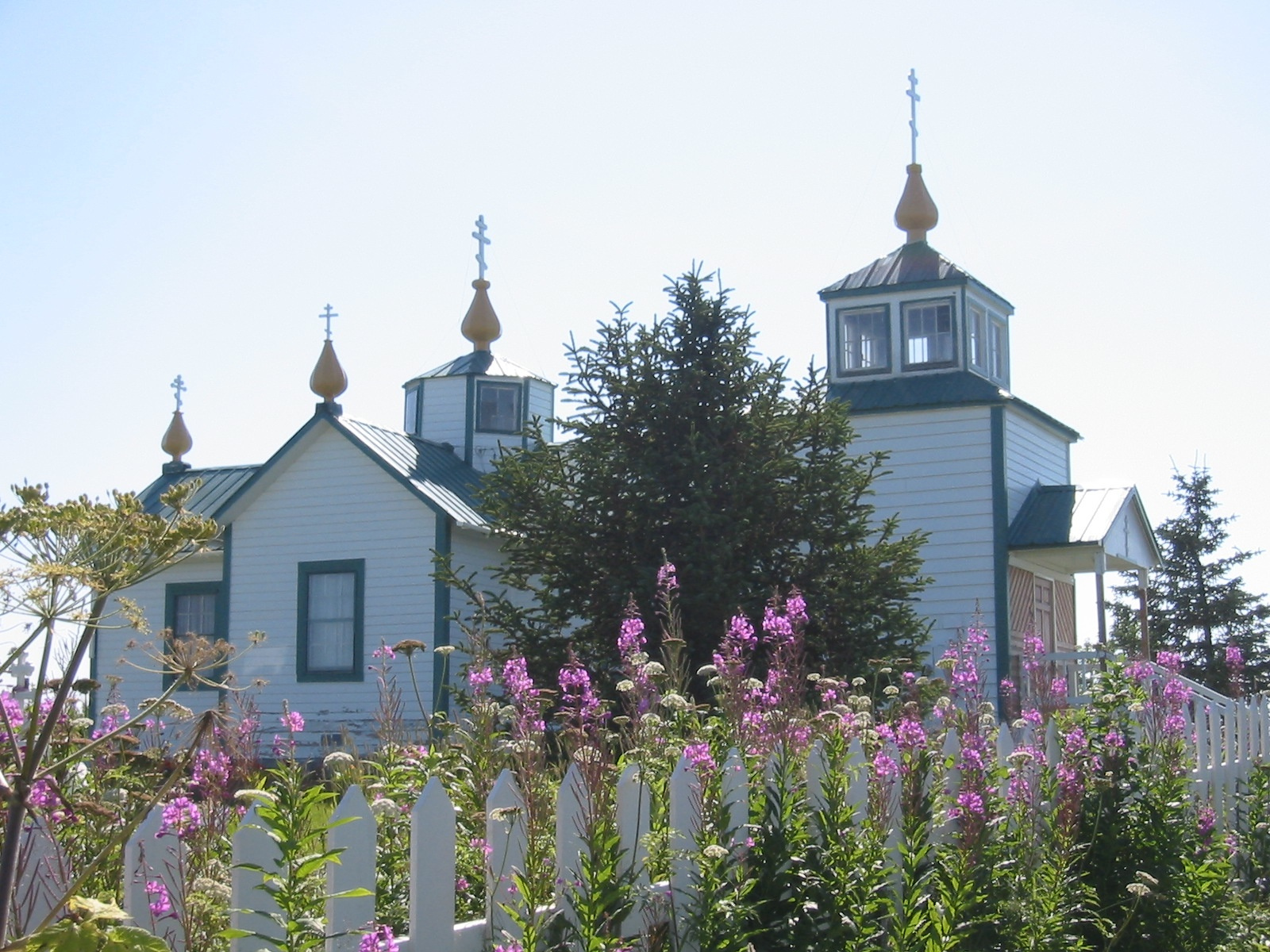
Ninilchik, Alaska.

Below is a comparison between some examples of Alaskan Russian from the village of Ninilchik and modern standard Russian, using a transcription of modern Russian that follows the same scheme (including vowel reduction, which is not marked in the standard Russian orthography). As in standard Russian, most consonants also have a palatalized (or 'soft') form, which is marked by an apostrophe, as in ⟨nʹ⟩. Words with multiple syllables have stress marked with an acute accent.

Alaskan Russian	Standard Russian		Gloss
Éta moy dom.	Éta moy dom.	Э́то мой дом.	This is my house.
Aná óchinʹ krasʹíwaya.	Aná óchinʹ krasʹívaya.	Она́ о́чень краси́вая.	She is very pretty.
Aná nas lʹúbʹit.	Aná nas lʹúbʹit.	Она́ нас лю́бит.	She loves us.
Mórʹya wʹíkʹinul úgalʹ.	Mórʹe víkʹinula úgalʹ.	Мо́ре вы́кинуло у́голь.	The sea brought in the coal.
Bózhi moy!	Bózhe moy!	Бо́же мой!	My God!
On moy brat.	On moy brat.	Он мой брат.	He is my brother.
U mʹinʹé nʹimnóshka rúskay krof.	U mʹinʹá nʹimnóshka rúskay króvʹi.	У меня́ немно́жко ру́сской кро́ви.	I have a little Russian blood.

== Grammar ==
Alaskan Russian has lost the gender structure of modern standard Russian , with the masculine prevailing over the feminine in most situations, and the complete loss of the neuter. Alaskan Russian has almost entirely lost the prepositional and genitive cases used in Russian, leaving only four productive cases - nominative, accusative, dative and instrumental. Subject Object Verb word order is preferred over Subject Verb Object (used in standard Russian).
