= Andrei Glazunov =

Alaskan explorer

Andrei Glazunov, an Alaskan Creole explorer, was the leader of the first Russian expedition to explore and establish trade along the Yukon River in the Alaska Interior in 1834.
