= Holy Transfiguration of Our Lord Chapel =

Historic church in Alaska, United States

- U.S. National Register of Historic Places
- Alaska Heritage Resources Survey
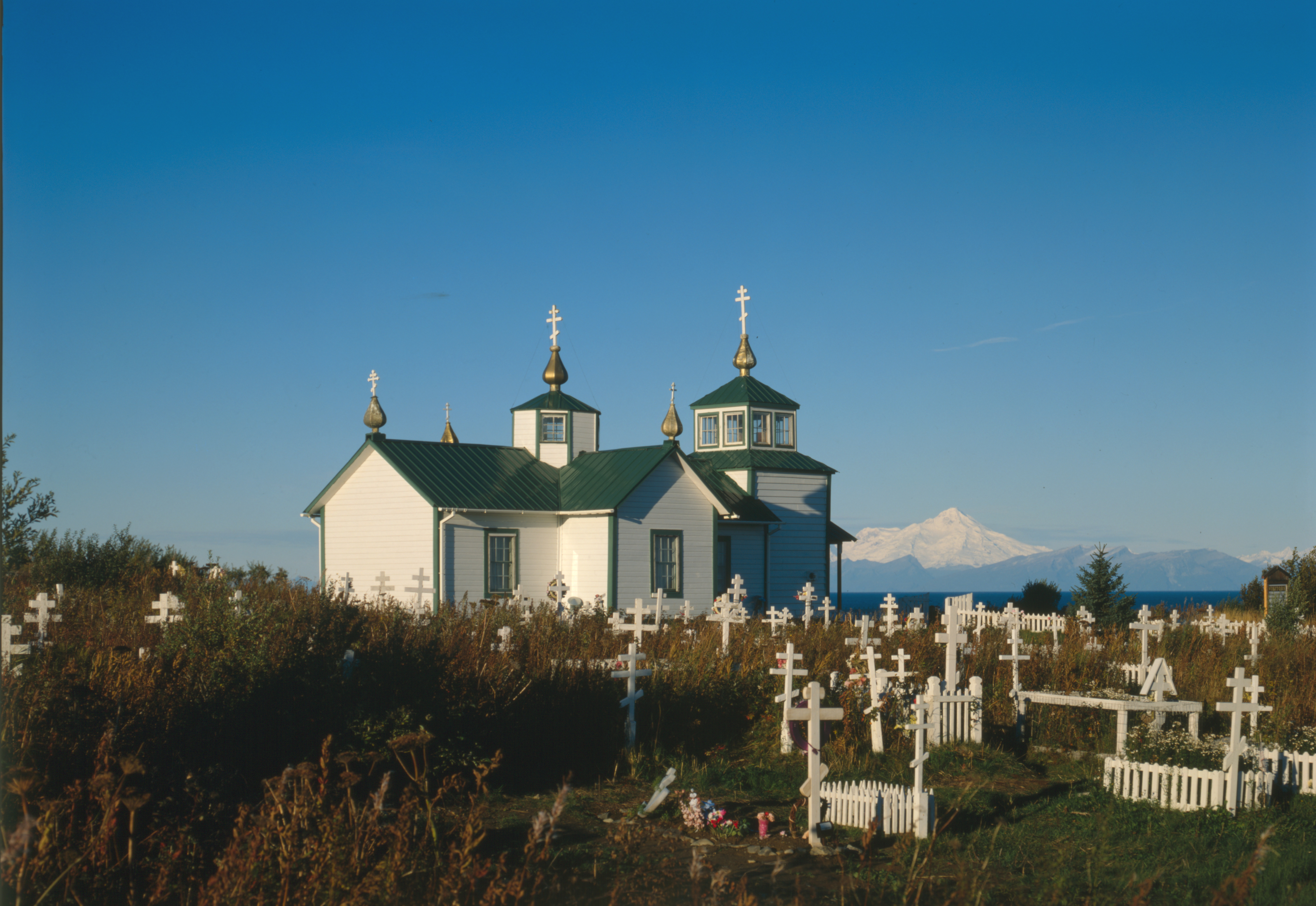

- Location within Alaska
- Location: Orthodox Avenue, Mile 135 of Sterling Highway in Ninilchik, Alaska
- Coordinates: 60°3′1″N 151°39′55″W
- Area: 0.4 acres (0.16 ha)
- Built: 1901
- Architect: Alexi Andreev Oskolfoff
- MPS: Russian Orthodox Church Buildings and Sites TR (AD)
- NRHP reference No.: 78003426
- AHRS No.: KEN-046

Significant dates
- Added to NRHP: May 22, 1978
- Designated AHRS: May 18, 1973

The Holy Transfiguration of Our Lord Chapel (Russian: Храм Преображения Господня) is a historic Russian Orthodox church located near Ninilchik, Alaska, that was built in 1901. It is an approximately 20-by-50-foot (6.1 m × 15.2 m) roughly cruxiform-shaped building, mainly designed by Alexi Andreev Oskolkoff who came from Sitka to supervise the building's construction. The 1901 church replaced an older church built near Ninilchik village's 1846 founding. As of 1977, the church competed only with a largely altered schoolhouse as an artifact of past Russian associations to the community.

It was listed on the National Register of Historic Places in 1978.

Now it is under Diocese of Alaska of the Orthodox Church in America.

== See also ==
- National Register of Historic Places listings in Kenai Peninsula Borough, Alaska
