= Ninilchik, Alaska =

Ninilchik Нинильчик (Russian) Niqnalchint (Denaʼina)
- Census-designated place
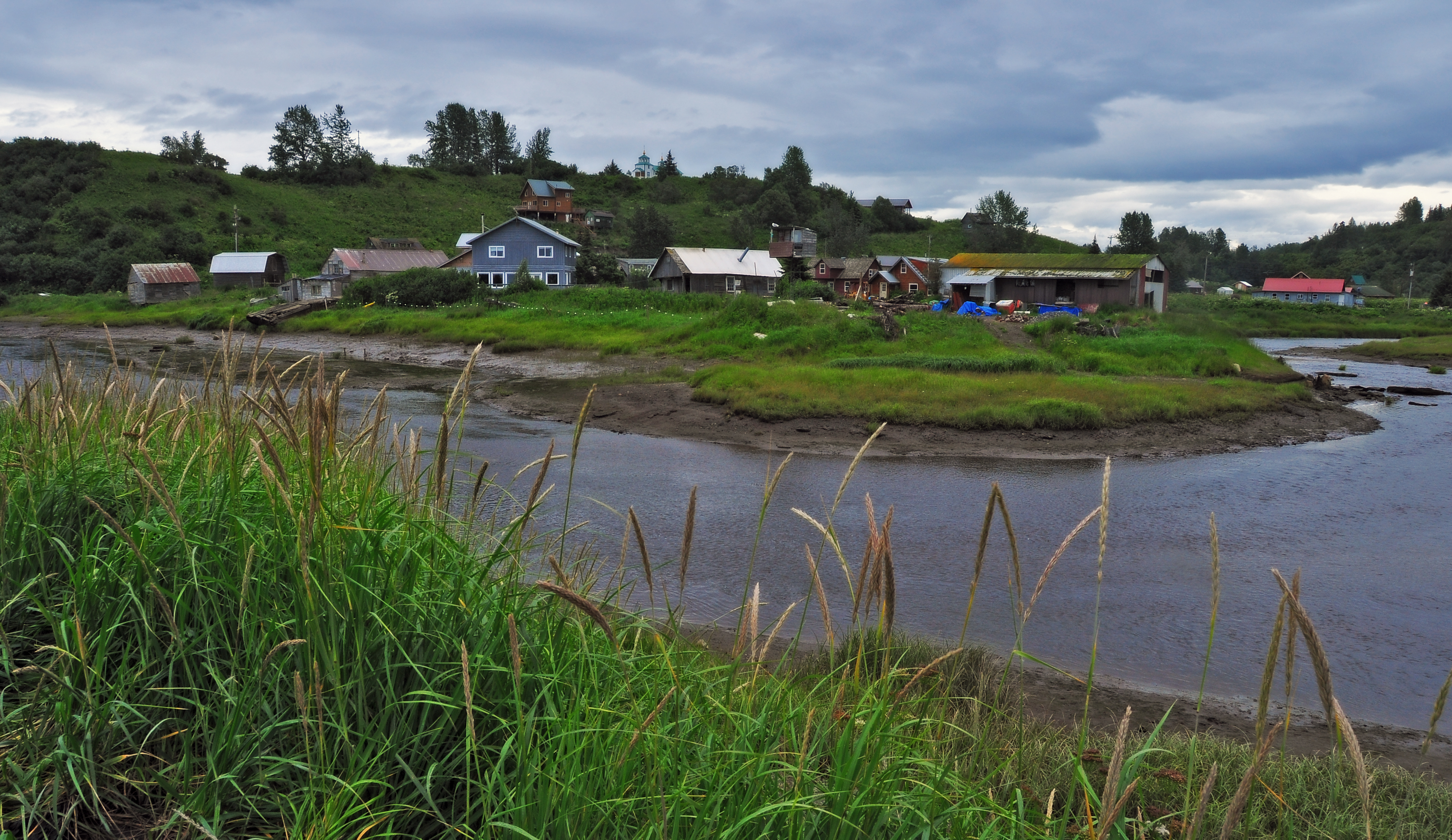
- Ninilchik in 2010

- Flag

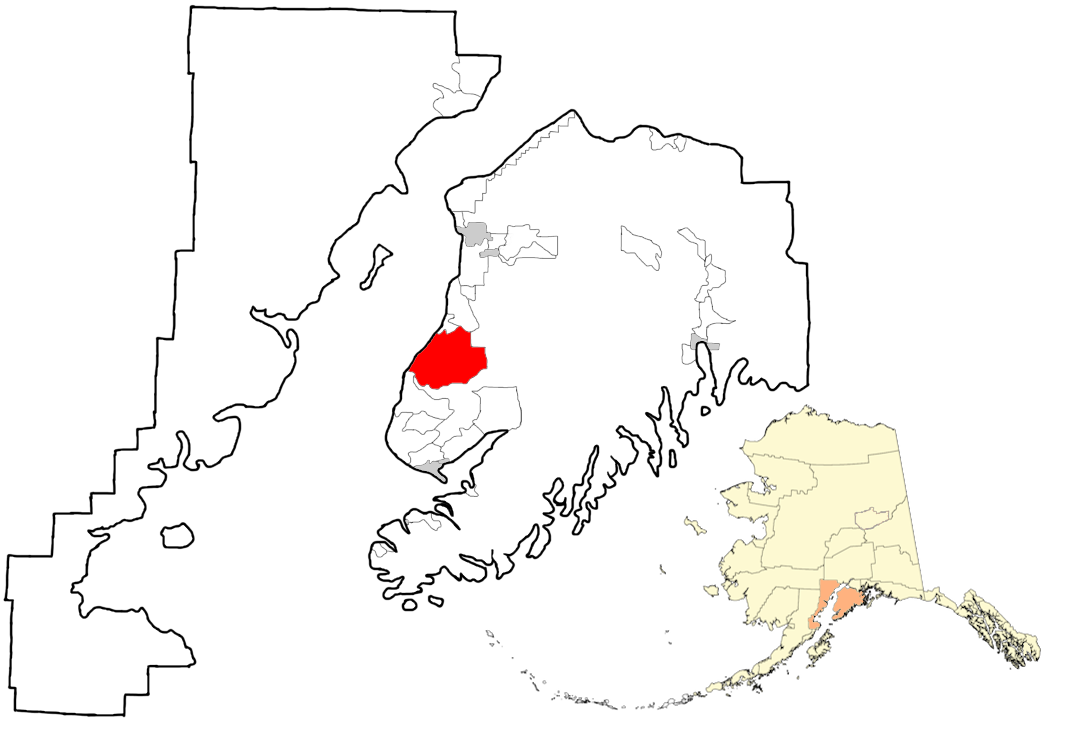
- Location in Kenai Peninsula Borough, Alaska
- Coordinates: 60°02′47″N 151°40′02″W
- Country: United States
- State: Alaska
- Borough: Kenai Peninsula

Government
  - Borough mayor: Peter Micciche
  - State senator: Gary Stevens (R)
  - State rep.: Sarah Vance (R)

Area
  - Total: 207.28 sq mi (536.84 km^{2})
  - Land: 207.24 sq mi (536.76 km^{2})
  - Water: 0.027 sq mi (0.07 km^{2})
- Elevation: 50 ft (15 m)

Population (2020)
  - Total: 845
  - Density: 4.1/sq mi (1.57/km^{2})
- Time zone: UTC-9 (Alaska (AKST))
  - Summer (DST): UTC-8 (AKDT)
- ZIP code: 99639
- Area code: 907
- FIPS code: 02-54480

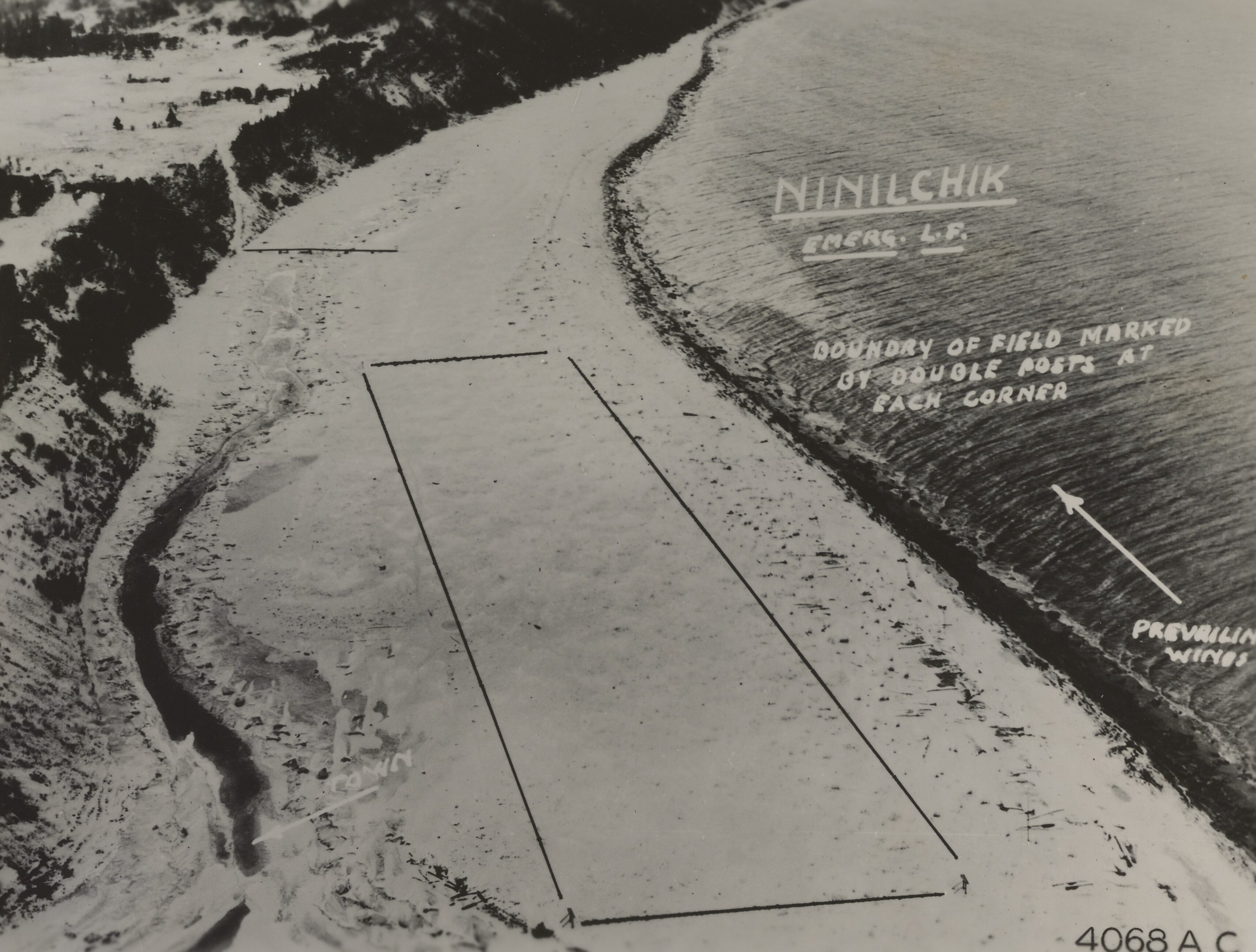
Ninilchik Airstrip in 1940

Ninilchik (Dena'ina: Niqnalchint, Russian: Нинильчик, Alaskan Russian: N'in'íl'chik) is a census-designated place (CDP) in Kenai Peninsula Borough, Alaska, United States. As of the 2020 census, Ninilchik had a population of 845.

It is considered an Alaska Native village under the Alaska Native Claims Settlement Act. In the 1970s, villagers formed the Ninilchik Native Association Incorporated. Later the Ninilchik Traditional Council (NTC) was established as the government of Alaska Natives in this area.

The Alaska Native people of Ninilchik have ancestors of Aleut and Alutiiq (Sugpiaq) descent, as well as some Dena'ina. Many also include Russian ancestors, from a couple of men who settled here with their Alutiiq wives and children in 1847, and later migrants. Alaskan Russian was widely spoken in the village for almost 200 years. Due to the community's isolation, this Russian dialect continued much in its mid-19th century form. In the 21st century, the dialect has been studied and preserved from local speakers.

== Geography ==
Ninilchik is on the west side of the Kenai Peninsula on the coast of Cook Inlet, 38 miles (61 km) by air southwest of Kenai, and 100 miles (160 km) southwest of Anchorage. Road access is by the Sterling Highway. By actual road miles it is a distance of 188 miles (303 km) from Anchorage and 44 miles (71 km) from Homer.

According to the United States Census Bureau, the CDP has a total area of 207.2 square miles (536.7 km^{2}), of which 0.03 square miles (0.07 km^{2}), or 0.01%, are water.

=== Climate ===
Ninilchik has a continental subarctic climate (Köppen Dsc).

Climate data for Ninilchik, Alaska (1940-1968 normals and extremes)
Month	Jan	Feb	Mar	Apr	May	Jun	Jul	Aug	Sep	Oct	Nov	Dec	Year
Record high °F (°C)	45 (7)	44 (7)	46 (8)	56 (13)	68 (20)	75 (24)	74 (23)	72 (22)	66 (19)	59 (15)	47 (8)	44 (7)	75 (24)
Mean daily maximum °F (°C)	24.4 (−4.2)	30.7 (−0.7)	29.7 (−1.3)	40.3 (4.6)	52.2 (11.2)	62.2 (16.8)	61.4 (16.3)	61.5 (16.4)	54.9 (12.7)	42.6 (5.9)	28.9 (−1.7)	23.0 (−5.0)	42.7 (5.9)
Daily mean °F (°C)	17.6 (−8.0)	23.0 (−5.0)	19.5 (−6.9)	32.2 (0.1)	43.3 (6.3)	51.3 (10.7)	52.5 (11.4)	52.0 (11.1)	45.6 (7.6)	33.4 (0.8)	21.4 (−5.9)	16.5 (−8.6)	34.0 (1.1)
Mean daily minimum °F (°C)	10.8 (−11.8)	15.3 (−9.3)	9.4 (−12.6)	24.0 (−4.4)	34.5 (1.4)	40.3 (4.6)	43.6 (6.4)	42.5 (5.8)	36.2 (2.3)	24.2 (−4.3)	13.8 (−10.1)	10.1 (−12.2)	25.4 (−3.7)
Record low °F (°C)	−20 (−29)	−22 (−30)	−33 (−36)	0 (−18)	22 (−6)	29 (−2)	26 (−3)	33 (1)	24 (−4)	0 (−18)	−12 (−24)	−32 (−36)	−33 (−36)
Average precipitation inches (mm)	1.69 (43)	1.28 (33)	0.94 (24)	1.50 (38)	1.50 (38)	1.22 (31)	2.44 (62)	3.41 (87)	2.74 (70)	2.68 (68)	1.77 (45)	2.07 (53)	23.23 (590)
Average snowfall inches (cm)	13.3 (34)	8.8 (22)	12.7 (32)	10.0 (25)	0.0 (0.0)	0.0 (0.0)	0.0 (0.0)	0.0 (0.0)	0.0 (0.0)	2.6 (6.6)	9.0 (23)	22.8 (58)	79.2 (201)
Average precipitation days (≥ 0.01 in)	6	5	4	7	5	6	10	10	10	9	6	9	86
Source: WRCC

== Demographics ==
Historical population
Census	Pop.	Note	%±
1880	53		—
1890	81		52.8%
1920	87		—
1930	124		42.5%
1940	132		6.5%
1950	97		−26.5%
1960	169		74.2%
1970	134		−20.7%
1980	341		154.5%
1990	456		33.7%
2000	772		69.3%
2010	883		14.4%
2020	845		−4.3%
U.S. Decennial Census

In Russian Alaska, Creole promyshlenniki intermarried with and Aleuts and Alutiiqs gave rise to a small but influential population of Alaskan Creoles. Ninilchik first appeared on the 1880 U.S. Census as an unincorporated Creole village. All 53 of its residents were Creole. It returned in 1890 with 81 residents, however the census combined the adjacent locales of the Laida native village and Anchor Point mine along with Treadwell coal mine (not to be confused with the Treadwell that is now within Juneau). There were 53 Creole residents (probably all Ninilchik residents), 16 Natives (probably the Tinneh residents of Laida), and 12 Whites (probably the residents of the two mining locales). Ninilchik did not return again until 1920, when it was spelled as "Ninilchic" on the census. It returned as Ninilchik again in 1930, and in every successive census to date. It was made a census-designated place (CDP) in 1980.

As of the census of 2000, there were 772 people, 320 households, and 223 families residing in the CDP. The population density was 3.7 inhabitants per square mile (1.4/km^{2}). There were 762 housing units at an average density of 3.7 per square mile (1.4/km^{2}). The racial makeup of the CDP was 82.25% White, 13.99% Native American, 0.52% Asian, 0.13% from other races, and 3.11% from two or more races. 0.65% of the population were Hispanic or Latino of any race.

There were 320 households, out of which 29.4% had children under the age of 18 living with them, 59.4% were married couples living together, 6.9% had a female householder with no husband present, and 30.3% were non-families. 23.1% of all households were made up of individuals, and 7.8% had someone living alone who was 65 years of age or older. The average household size was 2.41 and the average family size was 2.87.

In the CDP, the population was spread out, with 24.1% under the age of 18, 5.4% from 18 to 24, 26.3% from 25 to 44, 29.5% from 45 to 64, and 14.6% who were 65 years of age or older. The median age was 42 years. For every 100 females, there were 110.4 males. For every 100 females age 18 and over, there were 114.7 males.

The median income for a household in the CDP was $36,250, and the median income for a family was $41,750. Males had a median income of $29,861 versus $22,750 for females. The per capita income for the CDP was $18,463. About 10.4% of families and 13.9% of the population were below the poverty line, including 13.2% of those under age 18 and 7.2% of those age 65 or over.

== History ==
Before the arrival of Europeans in Alaska, Ninilchik was a Dena'ina Athabaskan lodging area used for hunting and fishing. The name Ninilchik probably derives from Niqnilchint, a Deni'ana Athabaskan word meaning "lodge is built place".

The first Europeans who permanently settled in the village were Russian colonists who moved there from Kodiak Island in 1847, two decades before the Alaska Purchase in 1867 by the United States. They were Russian Grigorii Kvasnikov (anglicized to Kvasnikoff), his Russian-Alutiiq wife Mavra Rastorguev (daughter of Agrafena Petrovna of Afognak), and their children. They were soon joined by the Oskolkoff family, also headed by a Russian man and Alutiiq woman. These were the core families, and their descendants, who often married Alutiiq, made up most of the village.

Their dialect of Russian as spoken in the mid-1800s (plus a few words borrowed from Alaska Native languages) became the primary language spoken in Ninilchik, and it survived in that form long past the 1867 Alaska Purchase. A few speakers of the Ninilchik Russian dialect were still alive in 2013. Russian and American linguists are documenting and cataloging this isolated dialect.

The 1880 United States census listed 53 "Creoles" living in Ninilchik in nine extended families. All nine old families of Ninilchik are descendants of the original Kvasnikoff and Oskolkoff families, with numerous marriages to Alaska Natives, primarily Alutiiq.

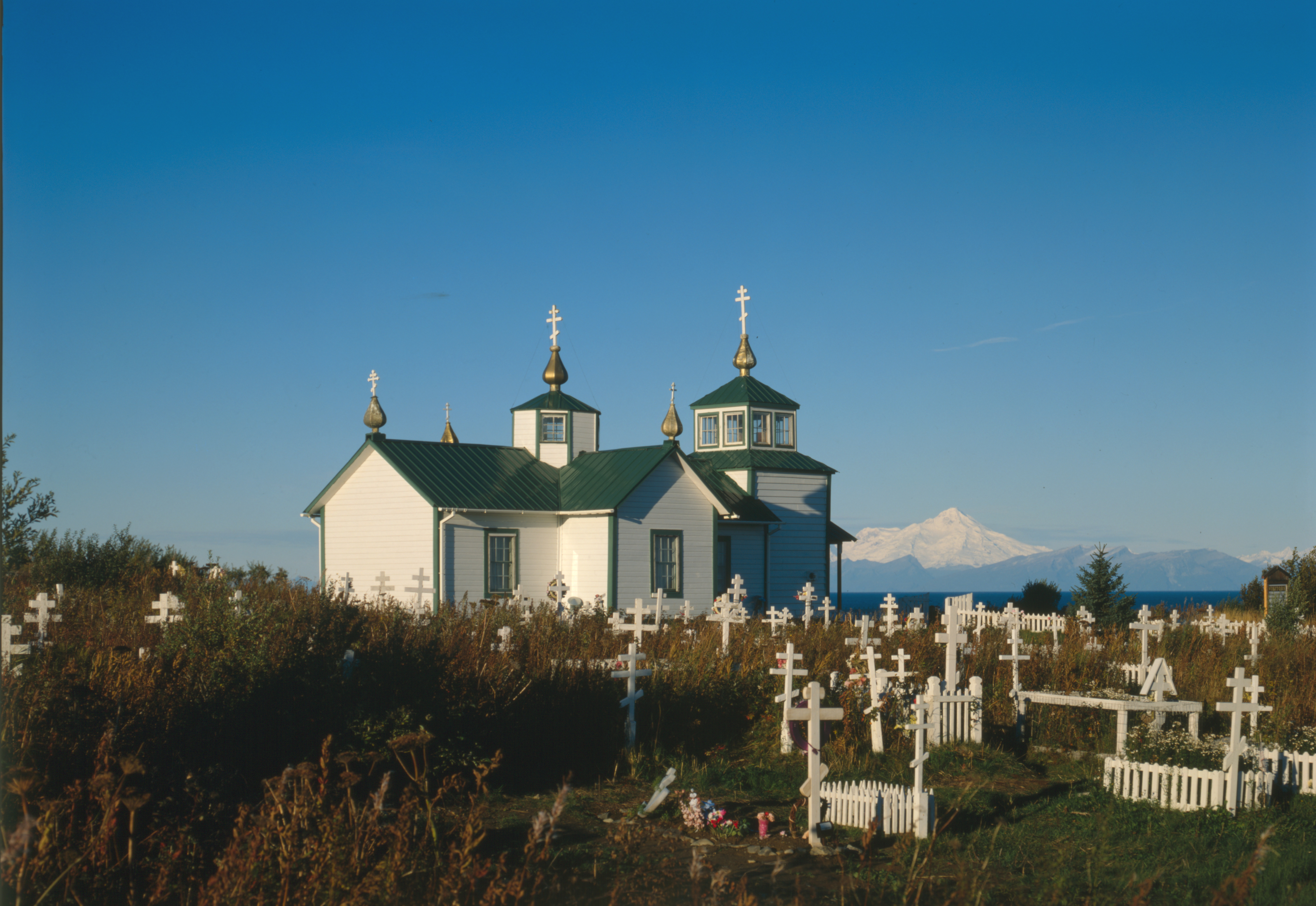
Holy Transfiguration of Our Lord Chapel

In 1896, a school was built and staffed by Russian Orthodox priests and laymen. Russian Orthodox priests were respected by Alaska Natives because in several areas of southwest Alaska, they had learned indigenous languages and held religious services in those languages. In 1901, the local Russian Orthodox Church was redesigned and constructed at its current site. In 1911 the first school sanctioned by the U.S. government was started, known as the Ninilchik School. In 2011 the community celebrated the 100th anniversary of the school.

In the 1940s, a number of American homesteaders began to live in the area. In 1949, Berman Packing Company began fish canning operations at Ninilchik. In 1950, the Sterling Highway was completed through the town.

=== Caribou Hills fire ===
A 2007 fire that burned near Ninilchik, known as the Caribou Hills fire, moved toward the town. At its peak threatened approximately 300 structures. It eventually burned nearly 60,000 acres (240 km^{2}) and destroyed 197 structures.

== Alaska Native people ==
Flag of the Ninilchik

The Alaska Native Claims Settlement Act recognized Ninilchik as an Alaska Native village. Under this law, villagers formed the Ninilchik Native Association Incorporated. The US Congress recognized that the people of Ninilchik comprised a quasi-sovereign government (equivalent to American Indian tribes). The Ninilchik Traditional Council (NTC) was authorized as the governing body for Natives who live in the area surrounding Ninilchik or who descended from the original inhabitants.

== Community ==
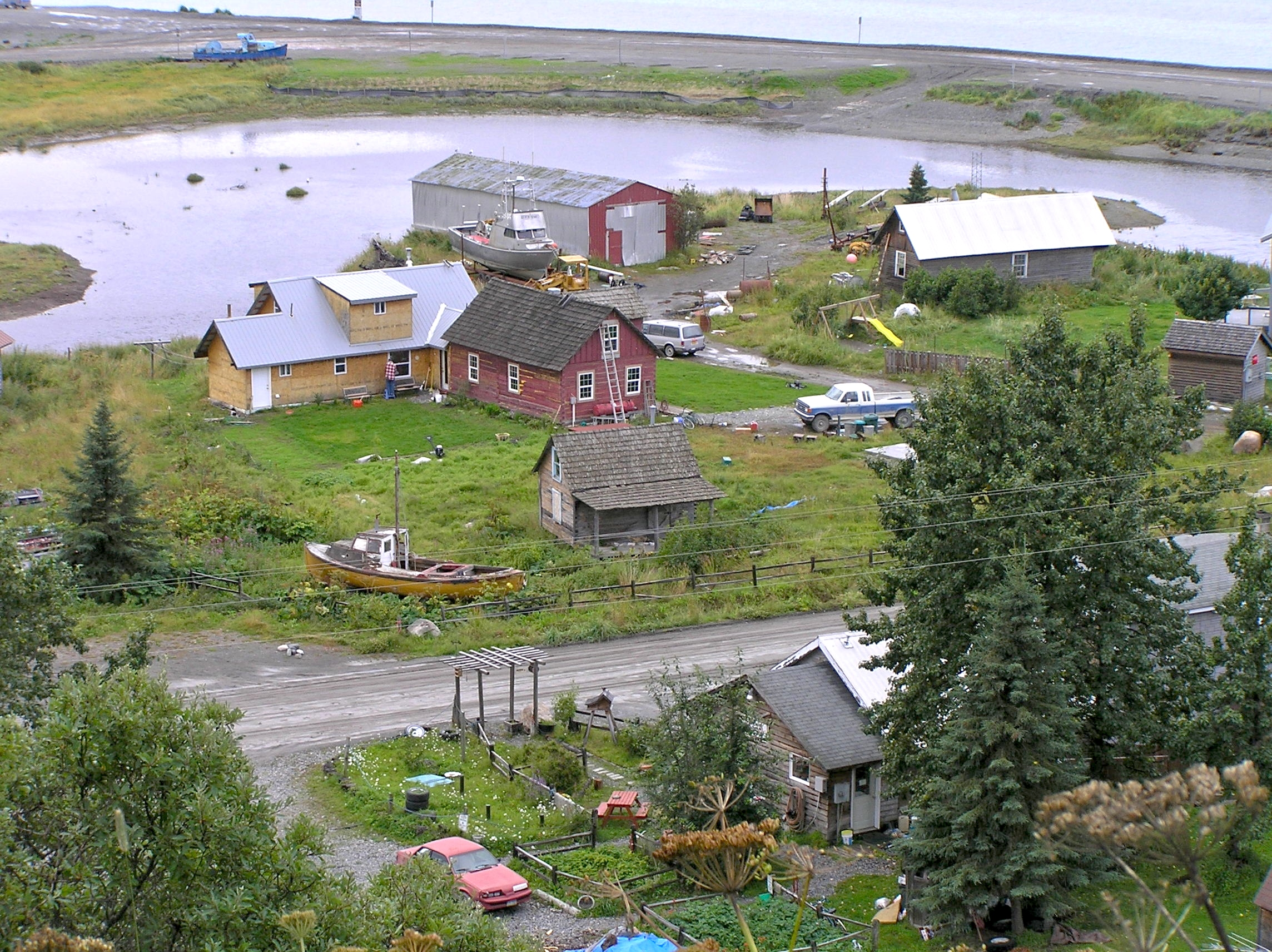
Ninilchik Village

The original village is located at the mouth of the Ninilchik River. A small harbor has been constructed near the mouth of the river. The name "Ninilchik" is used today, however, to refer to the original village as well as the community that has grown up around it, extending several miles north, east, and south. Residents of Ninilchik sometimes refer to the original village as Ninilchik Village or simply "the village".

Ninilchik as a town is not incorporated, but it is under the jurisdiction of the Kenai Peninsula Borough (KPB) and the State of Alaska. Volunteer groups, the NTC, the State of Alaska, and the KPB carry out most of the governmental functions in the area. These include fire-fighting (volunteer), highway snow-removal (state), health services (NTC), and primary and secondary schooling (KPB). A Russian Orthodox church, the Holy Transfiguration of Our Lord Chapel, is located in the community.

== Tourism ==
Ninilchik is a popular tourist attraction. Other attractions in the area are salmon fishing, typically now either with commercial guides or private commercial family operations, either along the beach north of Ninilchik River or in Cook Inlet whose waters touch the beach next to the village. Halibut can also be caught in Cook Inlet close to Ninilchik. Pacific razor clams are popular for digging on the beaches near Ninilchik, when the tides are low enough. Clammers should check regulations before digging, as this clam fishery has been closed until further notice. Panoramic views of four Cook Inlet volcanos, historical Old Village, the iconic Russian Orthodox church, Ninilchik River and Deep Creek watersheds, abundant wildlife, and bluff-lined beaches provide photogenic opportunities rich in diversity and depth.

Ninilchik is the host community for the annual Kenai Peninsula Fair and the annual Salmonfest Alaska (formerly Salmonstock) Music Festival. Ninilchik Chamber of Commerce sponsors the annual Clam Scramble, a river to river obstacle run held during or close to the solstice.

== Parks ==
There are two Alaska State Parks units in the Ninilchik area. Just north of town at mile 135 of the Sterling Highway is the Ninilchik State Recreation Area, which features two campgrounds, beach and river access, and scenic overlooks of Cook Inlet.

Just to the south of Ninilchik is the Deep Creek State Recreation Area which has a large campground on the beach, several parking areas for access to fishing in Deep Creek, and tractor-assisted boat launching. Both areas are known for the near-constant presence of bald eagles.

== Notable Person ==
- Loren Leman, politician, member of both houses of the legislature and lieutenant governor of Alaska. He grew up in Ninilchik and graduated from the Ninilchik School in 1968. He later moved to Anchorage, where he worked as a civil engineer and served in elected office continuously from 1989 to 2006. He was the first person of Alaska Native ancestry to be elected to statewide office.
