= Kathryn Dyakanoff Seller =

Alaska Native educator (1884–1980)

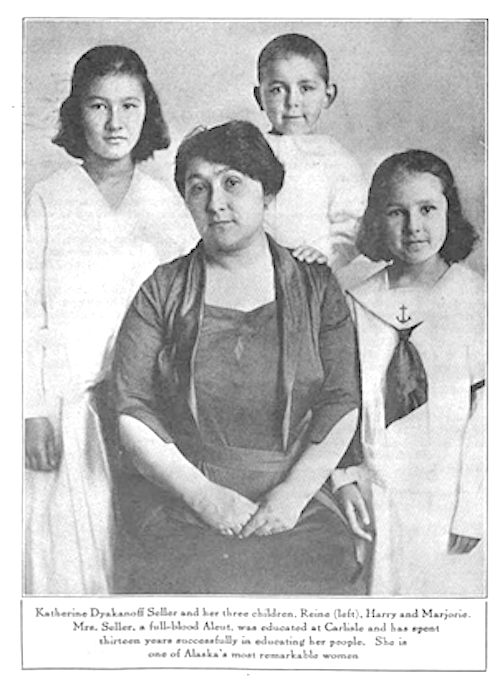
Kathryn Dyakanoff Seller with three of her children, from a 1922 publication.

Kathryn Dyakanoff Seller (Russian: Екатерина Дьяканова Селлер; born Ekaterina Pelagiia Dyakanoff; December 7, 1884 – June 17, 1980) was an Aleut educator. With her husband, she built and opened the first government-funded schoolhouse in the Aleutian Islands, in 1909.

== Early life ==
Ekaterina Pelagiia Dyakanoff was born in Unalaska, in an Aleut family. She lived at the missionary Jesse Lee Home for Children as a girl. She was sent to the Carlisle Indian Industrial School in Pennsylvania, graduating in 1906, and then to West Chester State Normal School, where she completed her studies in 1907.

== Career ==
Dyakanoff started teaching in 1908, in Sitka, for the Bureau of Indian Affairs. With her new husband, she sailed to Atka, Alaska in 1909 to open a new school for the bureau, the first government-funded schoolhouse in the Aleutian Islands. The school building was also their home, and they were active in the community, helping to build a community farm, acquiring a boat for community use, in addition to offering an industrial shop and sewing machines for students. The couple taught on several of the islands before returning to Anchorage in 1920. In widowhood, Kathryn, as she became known, returned to teaching at remote Alaskan schools that served Native students. She developed her skills as a basketmaker, served at various times as a midwife, health officer, reservation superintendent, and photographer. In 1950, her lifetime achievements were recognized with an award from the Department of the Interior and a medal from the United States Congress.

A former student, Mary Peterson, recalled Kathryn Seller's kindness later in life: "Mrs. Seller – Kathryn Seller – was my teacher. She was kind of old already, with gray, short hair. She was everything to us. She helped people that needed food...I don't know where she ordered them from, but she knew some of the people in the village who were in need because they had no money to buy food."

== Personal life ==
Dyakanoff married English-born Harry George Seller in Seattle in 1909. They had six children. Their son Alfred drowned as a boy. Their son Harry was killed in the Aleutian Islands Campaign during World War II. She was widowed when her husband died in 1936.

Kathryn Dyakanoff Seller died in San Francisco in 1980, aged 95.
