= Anchor River =

River in Alaska, United States

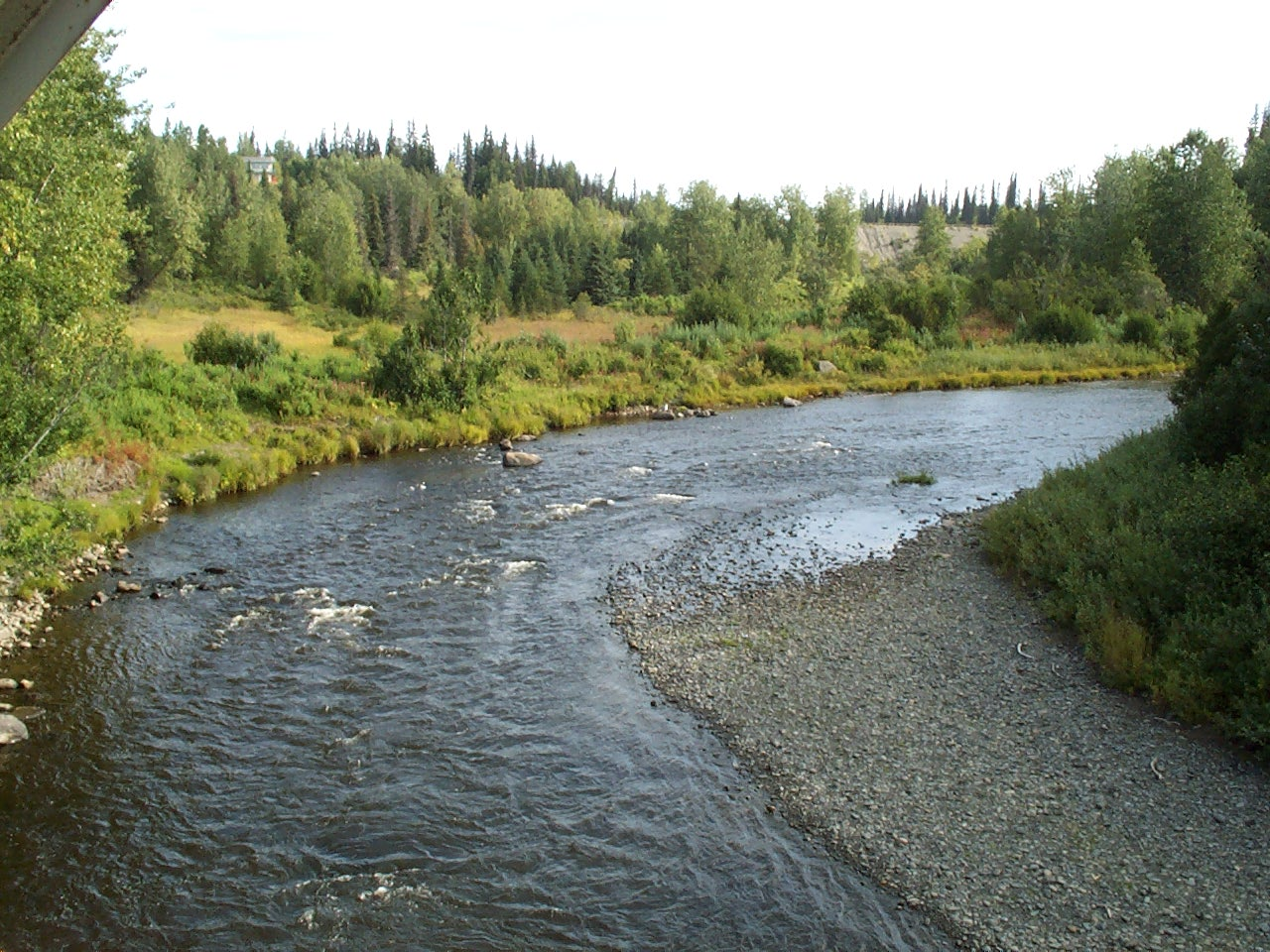

- Location of the mouth of the Anchor River in Alaska

Location
- Country: United States
- State: Alaska
- Borough: Kenai Peninsula

Physical characteristics
- Source: Kenai Peninsula
  - coordinates: 59°48′19″N 151°10′27″W
  - elevation: 1,424 ft (434 m)
- Mouth: Cook Inlet
  - location: Anchor Point, 14 miles (23 km) northwest of Homer
  - coordinates: 59°46′58″N 151°51′38″W
  - elevation: 16 ft (4.9 m)
- Length: 30 mi (48 km)

Basin features
- Tributaries
  - left: Twitter Creek
  - right: Chakok River (north fork)

The Anchor River is a stream on the Kenai Peninsula in the U.S. state of Alaska. Beginning near Bald Mountain on the eastern side of the lower peninsula, if flows generally west for 30 miles (48 km) into Cook Inlet near Anchor Point on the western side of the peninsula. The river mouth is 15 miles (24 km) northwest of Homer.

The middle reaches of the river pass through the Anchor River and Fritz Creek Critical Habitat Area, meant to protect fish and wildlife, especially moose. The lower river intersects North Fork Road and then the Sterling Highway before reaching Anchor and the Anchor River State Recreation Area (SRA) at the coast.

== Recreation Area ==
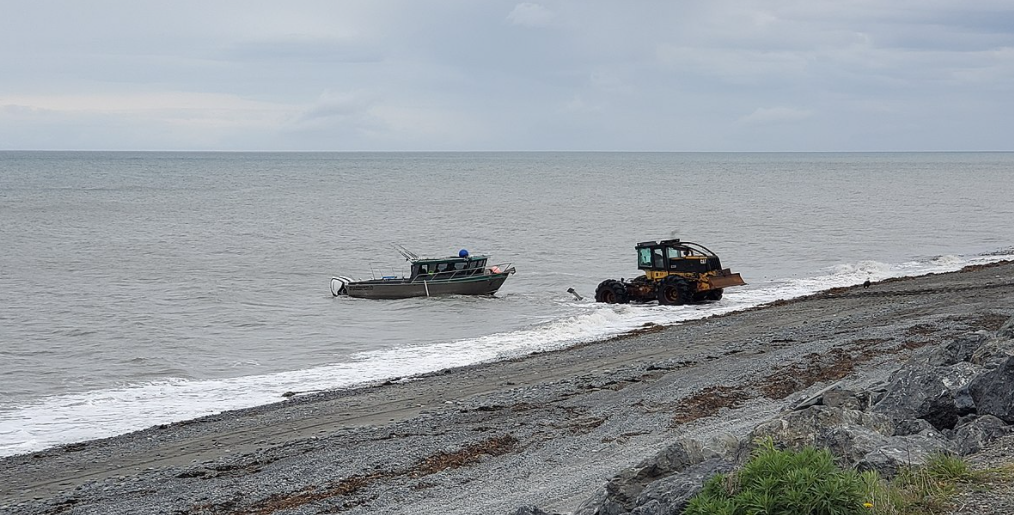
Tractor-launching a boat

The Anchor River State Recreation Area is a popular spot for camping and fishing in the summer months, when there are salmon runs, and catch-and-release steelhead fishing. Anchor Point, the site of the SRA, is the most westerly point in the U.S. highway system. From the beach at the recreation area you can see the distant peaks of the Aleutian Range, including the volcanoes Mount Augustine, Mount Iliamna, and Mount Redoubt. The area was also the site of gold mining activities in the 1890s.

Anchor Point does not have a harbor, but it has a boat-launch service at the beach that uses tractors to launch and recover boats from shore to deeper water.

== See also ==
- List of rivers of Alaska
