= Anchor Point, Alaska =

Anchor Point, Alaska K’kaq’
- Census-designated place
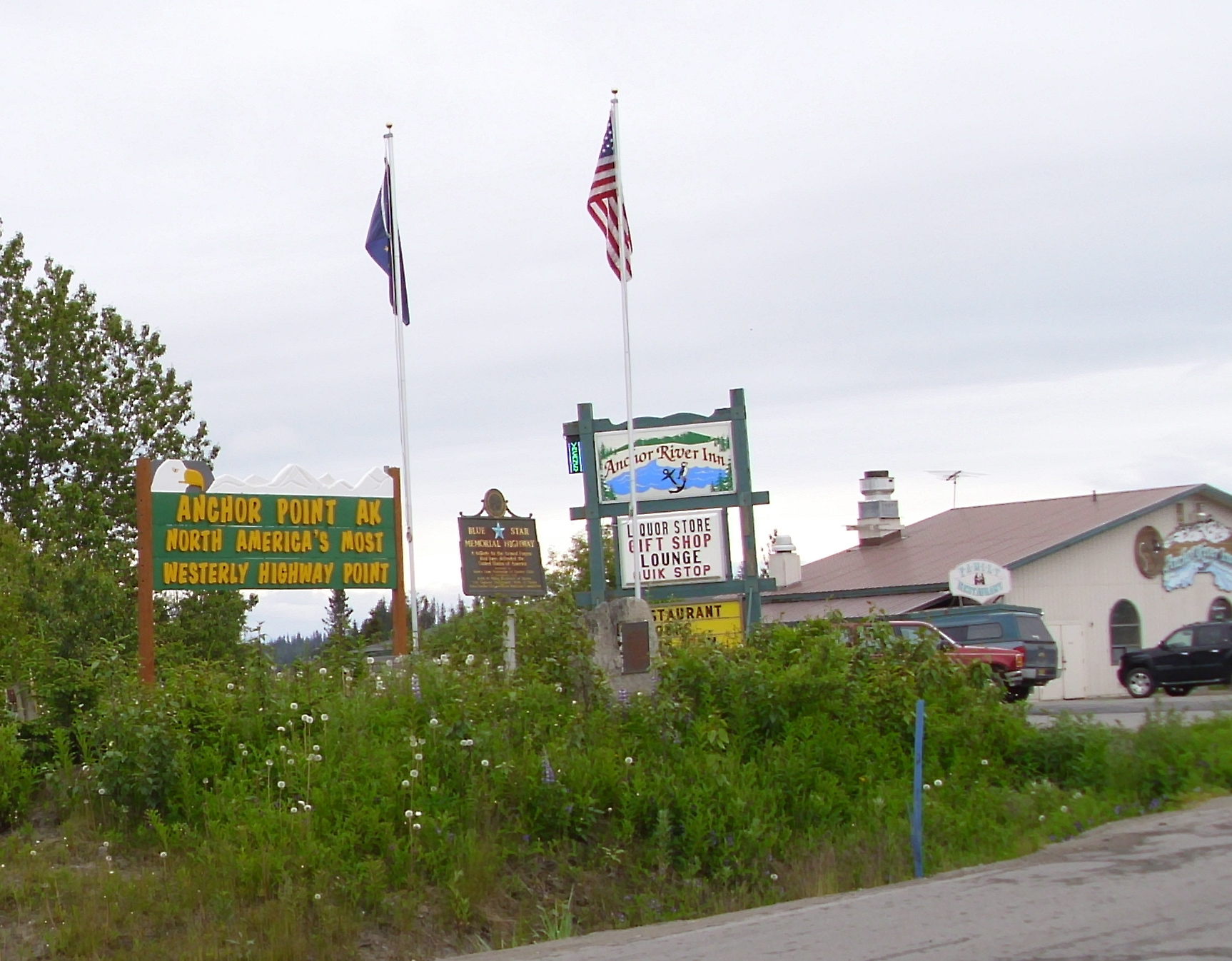
- North America's most westerly highway point sign in Anchor Point

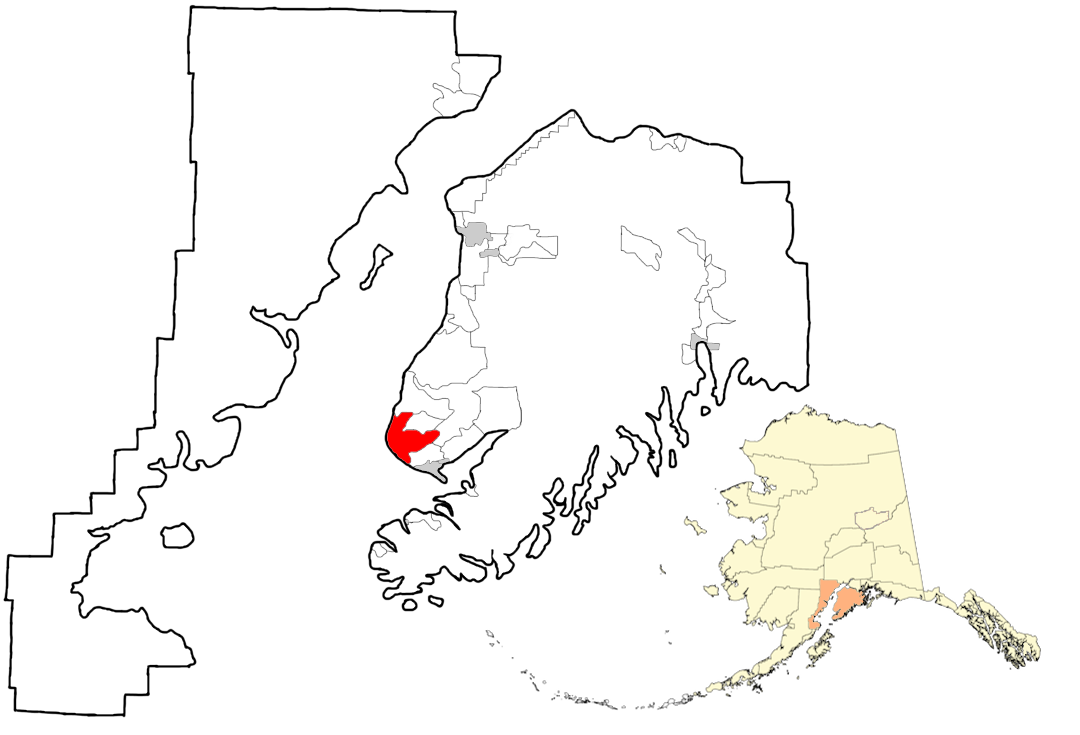
- Location in Kenai Peninsula Borough, Alaska
- Coordinates: 59°46′39″N 151°46′13″W
- Country: United States
- State: Alaska
- Borough: Kenai Peninsula

Government
  - Borough mayor: Peter Micciche
  - State senator: Gary Stevens (R)
  - State rep.: Sarah Vance (R)

Area
  - Total: 91.76 sq mi (237.66 km^{2})
  - Land: 91.65 sq mi (237.36 km^{2})
  - Water: 0.12 sq mi (0.30 km^{2})
- Elevation: 118 ft (36 m)

Population (2020)
  - Total: 2,105
  - Density: 23.0/sq mi (8.87/km^{2})
- Time zone: UTC-9 (Alaska (AKST))
  - Summer (DST): UTC-8 (AKDT)
- ZIP code: 99556
- Area code: 907
- FIPS code: 02-03110
- GNIS feature ID: 1412516

Anchor Point (Denaʼina: K’kaq’) is an unincorporated community and census-designated place (CDP) in Kenai Peninsula Borough, in the U.S. state of Alaska. As of the 2020 census, Anchor Point had a population of 2,105. The community is located along the Sterling Highway, part of Alaska State Route 1. Anchor Point is the westernmost point in the North American highway system.

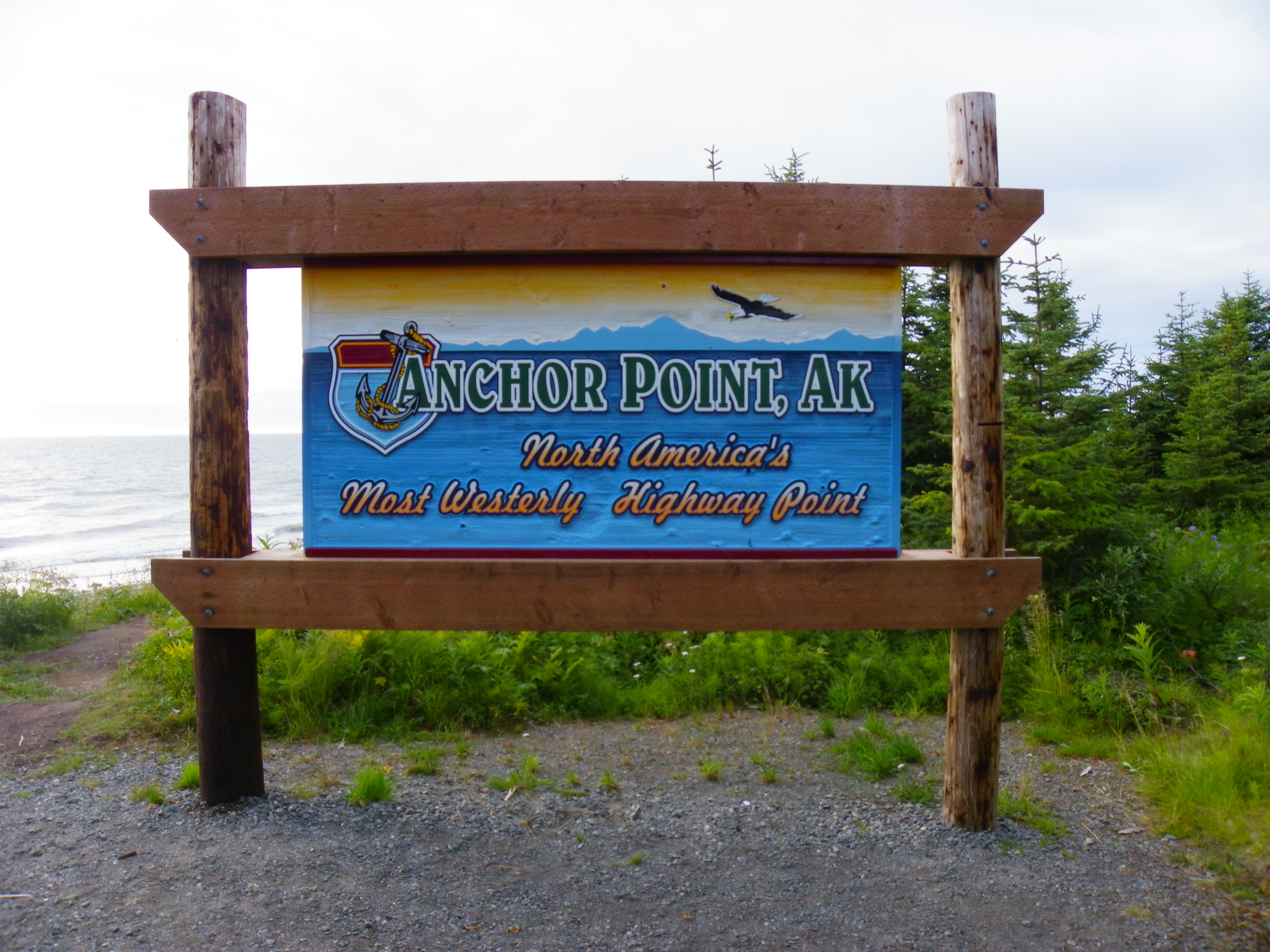
Sign designating North America's most westerly highway point

== History ==
The name "Anchor Point" comes from a legend that when Captain James Cook discovered the area, he lost an anchor. Settlers came beginning in the early 1900s.

== Geography ==
Anchor Point is located at 59°46′39″N 151°46′13″W (59.777468, -151.770220) on the eastern shore of Cook Inlet. It is bordered to the north by Happy Valley, to the northeast by Nikolaevsk, and to the south by Diamond Ridge. The Anchor River runs through the southern part of the CDP, entering Cook Inlet just west of the town center.

The town is the farthest west on the U.S. highway system. Alaska Route 1 runs southeast from Anchor Bay 15 miles (24 km) to Homer and northeast 59 miles (95 km) to Soldotna. Anchorage is 206 miles (332 km) to the northeast via Route 1.

According to the United States Census Bureau, the Anchor Bay CDP has a total area of 92.0 square miles (238.2 km^{2}), of which 91.8 square miles (237.7 km^{2}) are land and 0.2 square miles (0.5 km^{2}), or 0.23%, are water.

== Economy ==
A large portion of the Anchor Point economy relies on the Anchor River. Tourists come to fish the river during salmon runs in the summer. The river is also a source of coal. Along the coast, there are good spots for clam-digging, which draws tourists.

== Education ==
Anchor Point is in the Kenai Peninsula Borough School District. The Chapman School is a pre-kindergarten through eighth grade school off the main highway. Older students generally attend Homer High School.

The Anchor Point Public Library has one employee, and its collection includes approximately 12,000 items.

== Demographics ==
Historical population
Census	Pop.	Note	%±
1880	29		—
1940	20		—
1950	65		225.0%
1960	171		163.1%
1970	102		−40.4%
1980	226		121.6%
1990	866		283.2%
2000	1,845		113.0%
2010	1,930		4.6%
2020	2,105		9.1%
U.S. Decennial Census

Anchor Point first appeared on the 1880 U.S. Census as the Tinneh village of Laida. It was listed as the Anchor Point Mining Camp on the 1890 census, but along with Laida, was combined with the population of nearby Ninilchik, which had 81 residents in total. It did not report again until the 1940 U.S. Census, then as Anchor Point Settlement. From 1950-onwards, it has reported as Anchor Point. It became a census-designated place (CDP) in 1980.

=== 2020 census ===
As of the 2020 census, Anchor Point had a population of 2,105. The median age was 49.6 years. 19.6% of residents were under the age of 18 and 22.8% of residents were 65 years of age or older. For every 100 females there were 113.7 males, and for every 100 females age 18 and over there were 113.6 males age 18 and over.

0.0% of residents lived in urban areas, while 100.0% lived in rural areas.

There were 950 households in Anchor Point, of which 22.4% had children under the age of 18 living in them. Of all households, 47.4% were married-couple households, 24.8% were households with a male householder and no spouse or partner present, and 19.6% were households with a female householder and no spouse or partner present. About 34.0% of all households were made up of individuals and 16.3% had someone living alone who was 65 years of age or older.

There were 1,357 housing units, of which 30.0% were vacant. The homeowner vacancy rate was 3.6% and the rental vacancy rate was 11.0%.

Racial composition as of the 2020 census
Race	Number	Percent
White	1,799	85.5%
Black or African American	7	0.3%
American Indian and Alaska Native	63	3.0%
Asian	24	1.1%
Native Hawaiian and Other Pacific Islander	3	0.1%
Some other race	26	1.2%
Two or more races	183	8.7%
Hispanic or Latino (of any race)	50	2.4%

=== 2000 census ===
As of the census of 2000, there were 1,845 people, 711 households, and 467 families residing in the CDP. The population density was 20.3 inhabitants per square mile (7.8/km^{2}). There were 979 housing units at an average density of 10.8 per square mile (4.2/km^{2}).

The racial makeup of the CDP was 91.82% White, 3.36% Native American, 0.33% Asian, 0.11% Black or African American, 0.60% from other races, and 3.79% from two or more races. 1.73% of the population were Hispanic or Latino of any race.

There were 711 households, out of which 35.6% had children under the age of 18 living with them, 54.3% were married couples living together, 6.5% had a female householder with no husband present, and 34.3% were non-families. 25.6% of all households were made up of individuals, and 4.5% had someone living alone who was 65 years of age or older. The average household size was 2.59 and the average family size was 3.19.

In the CDP, the population was spread out, with 29.3% under the age of 18, 7.1% from 18 to 24, 25.4% from 25 to 44, 31.3% from 45 to 64, and 7.0% who were 65 years of age or older. The median age was 39 years. For every 100 females, there were 115.3 males. For every 100 females age 18 and over, there were 113.2 males.

The median income for a household in the CDP was $41,094, and the median income for a family was $49,821. Males had a median income of $39,688 versus $26,731 for females. The per capita income for the CDP was $18,668. About 8.2% of families and 11.9% of the population were below the poverty line, including 14.9% of those under age 18 and 1.5% of those age 65 or over.

== Parks ==
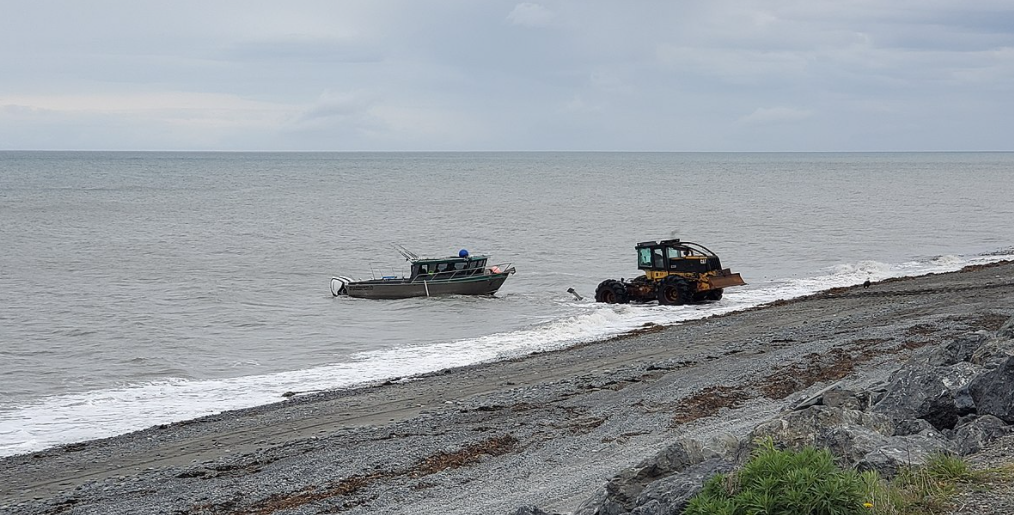
Launching a boat into Cook Inlet at the Anchor River SRA

There are two Alaska State Parks units in the area around Anchor Point. Anchor River State Recreation Area stretches along the banks of the river and down to the beach. Five miles north of Anchor Point is the Stariski State Recreation Site, a small park with a campground on a bluff overlooking Cook Inlet.
