= Nichols, Minnesota =

Unincorporated community in Minnesota, US

Nichols
- Unincorporated community
- Location within Minnesota Location within the United States
- Coordinates: 46°19′37″N 93°47′06″W
- Country: United States
- State: Minnesota
- County: Aitkin
- Township: Hazelton Township
- Elevation: 1,266 ft (386 m)
- Time zone: UTC-6 (Central (CST))
  - Summer (DST): UTC-5 (CDT)
- ZIP code: 56431
- Area code: 218
- GNIS feature ID: 648538

Nichols is an unincorporated community in Hazelton Township, Aitkin County, Minnesota, United States, along the north shore of Mille Lacs Lake. The community is located along U.S. 169 / State Highway 18 (co-signed) near 450th Avenue. Nearby places include Garrison, Malmo, Cutler, and Aitkin.
