= Haypoint, Minnesota =

Unincorporated community in Minnesota, US

Haypoint
- Unincorporated community
- Location within Minnesota Location within the United States
- Coordinates: 46°53′59″N 93°36′50″W
- Country: United States
- State: Minnesota
- County: Aitkin
- Township: Macville Township
- Elevation: 1,270 ft (390 m)
- Time zone: UTC-6 (Central (CST))
  - Summer (DST): UTC-5 (CDT)
- ZIP code: 55748
- Area code: 218
- GNIS feature ID: 654747

Haypoint is an unincorporated community in Macville Township, Aitkin County, Minnesota, United States, within the Hill River State Forest. The community is located along U.S. Highway 169 near the junction with Aitkin County Road 7, 610th Street. Nearby places include Hill City, Swatara, and Waukenabo. The Willow River, a tributary of the Mississippi River, flows through the community. The Moose River is also nearby.
