= Sheshebee, Minnesota =

Unincorporated community in Minnesota, US

Sheshebee
- Unincorporated community
- Location within Minnesota Location within the United States
- Coordinates: 46°42′17″N 93°14′33″W
- Country: United States
- State: Minnesota
- County: Aitkin
- Township: Shamrock Township
- Elevation: 1,237 ft (377 m)
- Time zone: UTC-6 (Central (CST))
  - Summer (DST): UTC-5 (CDT)
- ZIP code: 55760
- Area code: 218
- GNIS feature ID: 651971

Sheshebee (also spelled Sheshabee) is an unincorporated community in Shamrock Township, Aitkin County, Minnesota, United States. The community is located along 188th Avenue near Aitkin County Road 6, Goshawk Street. Nearby places include McGregor, Palisade, Tamarack, Libby, and Lake Minnewawa.
