= Minnewawa, Minnesota =

Unincorporated community in Minnesota, US

Minnewawa
- Unincorporated community
- Location within Minnesota Location within the United States
- Coordinates: 46°41′55″N 93°16′30″W
- Country: United States
- State: Minnesota
- County: Aitkin
- Township: Shamrock Township
- Elevation: 1,247 ft (380 m)
- Time zone: UTC-6 (Central (CST))
  - Summer (DST): UTC-5 (CDT)
- ZIP code: 55760
- Area code: 218
- GNIS feature ID: 647960

Minnewawa is an unincorporated community in Shamrock Township, Aitkin County, Minnesota, United States, along Lake Minnewawa. The community is located along 200th Avenue near Aitkin County Road 6, Goshawk Street. Nearby places include McGregor, Palisade, Tamarack, and Libby.
