= Wealthwood, Minnesota =

Unincorporated community in Minnesota, US

Wealthwood
- Unincorporated community
- Location within Minnesota Location within the United States
- Coordinates: 46°21′47″N 93°39′15″W
- Country: United States
- State: Minnesota
- County: Aitkin
- Township: Wealthwood Township
- Elevation: 1,273 ft (388 m)
- Time zone: UTC-6 (Central (CST))
  - Summer (DST): UTC-5 (CDT)
- ZIP code: 56431
- Area code: 218
- GNIS feature ID: 653871

Wealthwood is an unincorporated community in Wealthwood Township, Aitkin County, Minnesota, United States, along the north shore of Mille Lacs Lake. The community is located along State Highway 18 (MN 18) near the junction with Aitkin County Road 51, 385th Avenue. Nearby places include Garrison, Malmo, Glen, and Aitkin.
