= Shovel Lake, Minnesota =

Unincorporated community in Minnesota, US

Shovel Lake
- Unincorporated community
- Location within Minnesota Location within the United States
- Coordinates: 46°57′27″N 93°45′13″W
- Country: United States
- State: Minnesota
- County: Aitkin
- Elevation: 1,339 ft (408 m)
- Time zone: UTC-6 (Central (CST))
  - Summer (DST): UTC-5 (CDT)
- ZIP code: 55785
- Area code: 218
- GNIS feature ID: 658253

Shovel Lake is an unincorporated community in Aitkin County, Minnesota, United States. The community is located along Aitkin County Road 67 (650th Street) near 426th Place. Shovel Lake is located within Northwest Aitkin Unorganized Territory of Aitkin County. Nearby places include Hill City, Swatara, and Remer. The Willow River, a tributary of the Mississippi, flows nearby.
