= Land o' Lakes State Forest =

State Forest in Cass, Aitkin, and Crow Wing counties, Minnesota

- Location within Minnesota
- Interactive map of Land o' Lakes State Forest

Geography
- Location: Cass, Aitkin, and Crow Wing counties, Minnesota, United States
- Coordinates: 46°56′03″N 93°56′39″W
- Elevation: 1,358 feet (414 m)
- Area: 51,498 acres (20,841 ha)

Administration
- Established: 1933
- Authority: Minnesota DNR, Cass County, private
- Website: www.dnr.state.mn.us/state_forests/sft00031/index.html

Ecology
- WWF Classification: Western Great Lakes Forests
- EPA Classification: Northern Lakes and Forests
- Disturbance: Wildfire
- Dominant tree species: Populus tremuloides, Betula papyrifera

The Land o' Lakes State Forest is a state forest located primarily in Cass County, Minnesota, with portions extending into adjacent Aitkin and Crow Wing counties. The forest has small shared borders with the Chippewa National Forest to the north, and the Hill River State Forest to east. Over half of the forest's land is managed by the Minnesota Department of Natural Resources; the remaining land is managed by Cass County or is privately held.

== History and overview ==
The land of the forest was originally covered in old-growth Eastern White and Red Pine, which was logged between 1800 and 1890 by several large timber companies. Originally, logs were driven to sawmills downstream in the Mississippi River via Mitchell Lake. The intensity of logging was increased by the implementation of a railroad grade in 1890 by the Simpson Logging Company. The remaining old-growth pine was logged on the holdings of the Pine Tree Lumber Company, a subsidiary of Weyerhaeuser, in 1907. Natural reforestation was stagnated after the original harvests due to a high incidence of wildfires, which ceased in the 1930s. Aspen and paper birch are now the dominant species, although pine, northern hardwoods, and deciduous and coniferous lowland species are scattered through the forest.

== Recreation ==
Popular outdoor recreational activities such as boating, canoeing, kayaking, and swimming are available on the 1,590 acres (6.4 km^{2}) Washburn Lake, and other smaller lakes accessible from the forest. The main campsite of the forest was built by the Civilian Conservation Corps during the forest's establishment in 1933. Trails are designated for hiking, with 14 miles (23 km) specifically designated for cross-country skiing in the wintertime, and 26.9 miles (43.3 km) designated for Class I and II all-terrain vehicle use.

== See also ==
- List of Minnesota state forests
