= Kimberly, Minnesota =

Unincorporated community in Minnesota, US

Kimberly
- Unincorporated community
- Location within Minnesota Location within the United States
- Coordinates: 46°33′39″N 93°27′59″W
- Country: United States
- State: Minnesota
- County: Aitkin
- Township: Kimberly Township
- Elevation: 1,247 ft (380 m)
- Time zone: UTC-6 (Central (CST))
  - Summer (DST): UTC-5 (CDT)
- ZIP code: 56431
- Area code: 218
- GNIS feature ID: 646147

Kimberly is an unincorporated community in Kimberly Township, Aitkin County, Minnesota, United States. The community is located along Aitkin County Road 5 (Nature Avenue) near the junction with County Road 56 (380th Street). Nearby places include Aitkin, Rossburg, Palisade, McGregor, East Lake, and Kimberly Wildlife Management Area. The Rice River flows through the community. State Highways 47 (MN 47) and 210 (MN 210) are both nearby.

== History ==
The community had a post office from 1879 to 1974. Kimberly was named for Moses C. Kimberly, an official of the Northern Pacific Railway.

Historical population
Census	Pop.	Note	%±
1880	33		—
U.S. Decennial Census
