= Glory, Minnesota =

Unincorporated community in Minnesota, US

Glory
- Unincorporated community
- Location within Minnesota Location within the United States
- Coordinates: 46°25′03″N 93°36′02″W
- Country: United States
- State: Minnesota
- County: Aitkin
- Township: Nordland Township and Wealthwood Township
- Elevation: 1,266 ft (386 m)
- Time zone: UTC-6 (Central (CST))
  - Summer (DST): UTC-5 (CDT)
- ZIP code: 56431
- Area codes: 218 and 320
- GNIS feature ID: 654724

Glory is an unincorporated community in Aitkin County, Minnesota, United States. The community is located along 360th Avenue near Aitkin County Road 12 (Deer Street). 280th Street is also in the immediate area. Glory is located within Nordland Township and Wealthwood Township. Nearby places include Aitkin and Glen. State Highway 47 (MN 47) and Aitkin County Road 28 are both nearby. Glory is four miles north of Mille Lacs Lake.

A post office was established at Glory in 1901, and remained in operation until it was discontinued in 1913. The community took its name from the song "Glory, Glory, Hallelujah".
