= Aitkin Township, Aitkin County, Minnesota =

Township in Minnesota, United States

Aitkin Township
- Township
- Location in Aitkin County

- Location within the state of Minnesota
- Coordinates: 46°32′21″N 93°45′43″W
- Country: United States
- State: Minnesota
- County: Aitkin
- Established: June 18, 1873
- Named for: William Alexander Aitken

Area
  - Total: 34.3 sq mi (88.9 km^{2})
  - Land: 32.1 sq mi (83.2 km^{2})
  - Water: 2.2 sq mi (5.7 km^{2})
- Elevation: 1,191 ft (363 m)

Population (2020)
  - Total: 918
  - Density: 28.6/sq mi (11.0/km^{2})
- Time zone: UTC-6 (Central (CST))
  - Summer (DST): UTC-5 (CDT)
- ZIP code: 56431
- Area code: 218
- FIPS code: 27-00478
- GNIS feature ID: 0663389

Aitkin Township (/ˈeɪkɪn/ AY-kin) is a township in Aitkin County, Minnesota, United States. The population was 918 as of the 2020 census. The 2021 population estimate is 934.

== History ==
Aitkin Township, Aitken County, is named after William Alexander Aitken, a fur trader for the American Fur Company which had a trading post at the confluence of the Mississippi and Ripple rivers. It was incorporated June 18, 1873.

== Geography ==
According to the United States Census Bureau, the township has a total area of 34.3 square miles (88.9 km^{2}); of this, 32.1 square miles (83.2 km^{2}) is land and 2.2 square miles (5.7 km^{2}), or 6.40%, is water.

The city of Aitkin lies geographically within the township but is a separate entity.

Within the township, the wreck of the 1884 steamboat Andy Gibson is listed on the National Register of Historic Places.

=== Major highways ===
- U.S. Highway 169
- Minnesota State Highway 47
- Minnesota State Highway 210

=== Lakes ===
- Bass Lake
- Blue Lake (north quarter)
- Cedar Lake (northeast half)
- Dogfish Lake
- Lily Lake
- Pickerel Lake
- Poor Farm Lake
- Tarr Lake

=== Adjacent townships ===
- Morrison Township (northeast)
- Spencer Township (east)
- Nordland Township (southeast)
- Farm Island Township (south)
- Deerwood Township, Crow Wing County (southwest)
- Rabbit Lake Township, Crow Wing County (west)

=== Cemeteries ===
The township contains the following cemeteries: Lakeview and Saint Thomas.

== Demographics ==
As of the census of 2000, there were 642 people, 267 households, and 190 families residing in the township. The population density was 19.8 people per square mile (7.6/km^{2}). There were 356 housing units at an average density of 11.0/sq mi (4.2/km^{2}). The racial makeup of the township was 97.35% White, 1.40% Native American, 0.47% Asian, and 0.78% from two or more races. Hispanic or Latino of any race were 1.09% of the population.

There were 267 households, out of which 30.0% had children under the age of 18 living with them, 58.8% were married couples living together, 10.9% had a female householder with no husband present, and 28.5% were non-families. 24.3% of all households were made up of individuals, and 12.7% had someone living alone who was 65 years of age or older. The average household size was 2.40 and the average family size was 2.84.

In the township the population was spread out, with 25.7% under the age of 18, 5.5% from 18 to 24, 23.8% from 25 to 44, 26.6% from 45 to 64, and 18.4% who were 65 years of age or older. The median age was 42 years. For every 100 females, there were 96.3 males. For every 100 females age 18 and over, there were 90.8 males.

The median income for a household in the township was $34,250, and the median income for a family was $38,750. Males had a median income of $34,583 versus $20,769 for females. The per capita income for the township was $18,896. About 4.0% of families and 7.1% of the population were below the poverty line, including 3.8% of those under age 18 and 6.2% of those age 65 or over.
