= Hassman, Minnesota =

Unincorporated community in Minnesota, US

Hassman
- Unincorporated community
- Location within Minnesota Location within the United States
- Coordinates: 46°36′07″N 93°36′47″W
- Country: United States
- State: Minnesota
- County: Aitkin
- Township: Morrison Township
- Elevation: 1,207 ft (368 m)
- Time zone: UTC-6 (Central (CST))
  - Summer (DST): UTC-5 (CDT)
- ZIP code: 56431
- Area code: 218
- GNIS feature ID: 654745

Hassman is an unincorporated community in Morrison Township, Aitkin County, Minnesota, United States. The community is located near the junction of U.S. Highway 169 and State Highway 210 (MN 210), north of Aitkin. The Mississippi River and the Rice River both flow nearby.
