= Bennettville =

Bennettville may refer to:

- Bennetville, former name of Dutton, Ontario, Canada
- Bennettville, California, United States
- Bennettville, Minnesota, United States

== See also ==
- Bennettsville, Indiana, United States
- Bennettsville, South Carolina, United States
