= Red Top, Minnesota =

Unincorporated community in Minnesota, US

Redtop
- Unincorporated community
- Location within Minnesota Location within the United States
- Coordinates: 46°10′34″N 93°23′51″W
- Country: United States
- State: Minnesota
- County: Aitkin
- Township: Idun Township
- Elevation: 1,286 ft (392 m)
- Time zone: UTC-6 (Central (CST))
  - Summer (DST): UTC-5 (CDT)
- ZIP code: 56350
- Area code: 320
- GNIS feature ID: 649898

Redtop (also spelled Red Top) is an unincorporated community in Idun Township, Aitkin County, Minnesota, United States.

The community is northeast of Isle, and southwest of McGrath.

== History ==
Disclaimer: Much of the information gathered and used in this article is from personal histories of past and a couple of current residents of Red Top. As time has passed, records have been lost and all that is left are stories. This information is as accurate as it can be considering its sources.

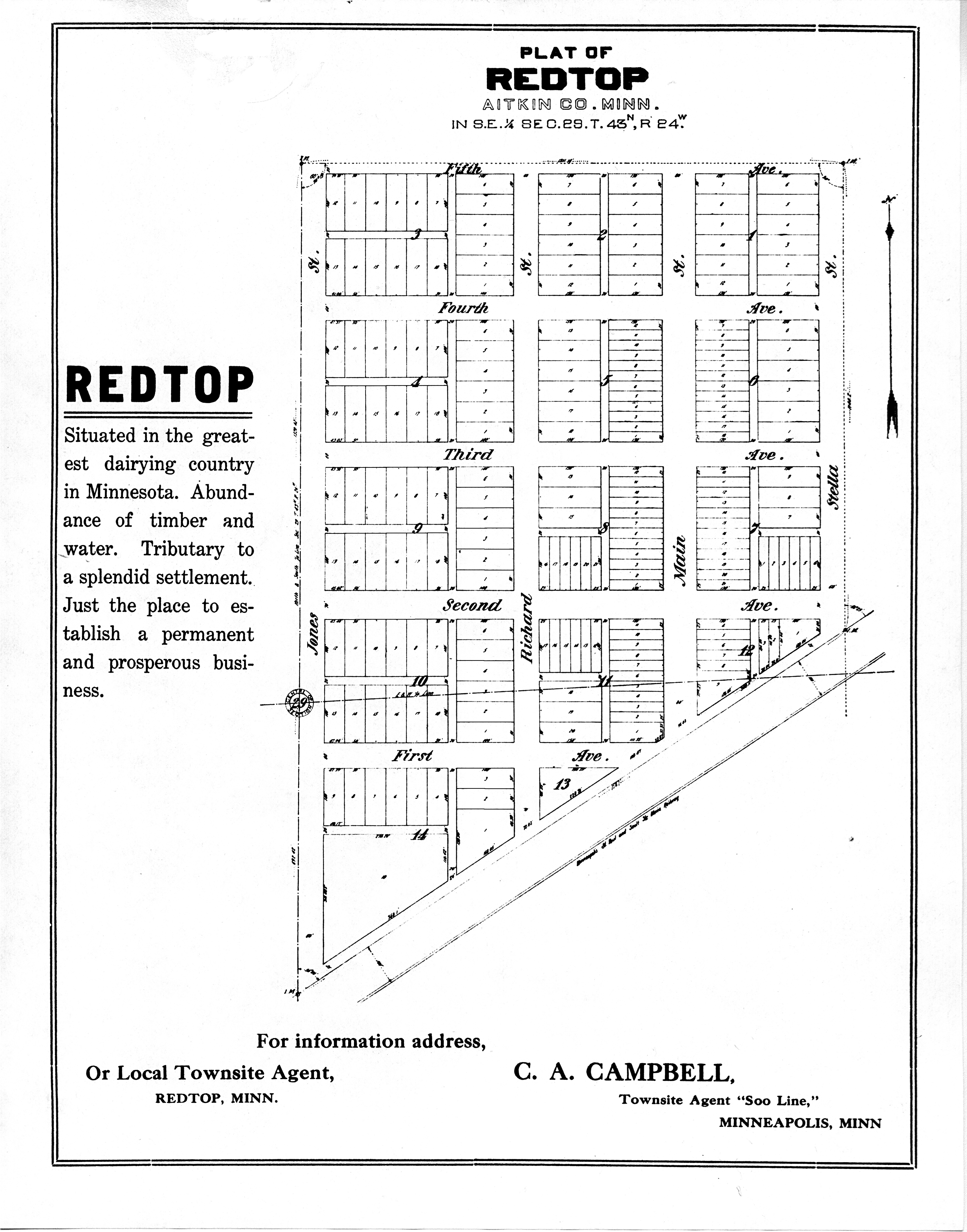
The original 1908 plot of Red Top

=== Founding ===
Red Top is a small former railroad community founded in 1908. It is located in Section 29 of Idun Township in southern Aitkin County, about 4 miles due east of Mille Lacs Lake. (Geographical location 46.176785,-93.395766) It celebrated its centennial on August 9, 2008, with over 50 people in attendance to the event.

The Soo Line Railroad, through their Tri- State Land Company division, acquired the land it is on from Richard J. Lewis in May 1908. A team of company surveyors laid out the lots with tamarack stakes in the summer of 1908, making it the southernmost subdivision in Aitkin County. Only the four corners of the community were marked with iron stakes. The unincorporated community of Red Top officially came to exist on August 6, 1908, when the Aitkin County Board of Commissioners approved the plat and ordered it filed. On August 17, Tri-State held an uninspiring land sale in Minneapolis. Only three business lots and a few residential lots were sold. The Tri-State agent wisely concluded that clearing the land and building some roads would help future sales.

=== Name Origin Disagreement ===
Someone from Tri-State Land Company decided to name the community Red Top. The popular legend is that the community is named after Olivia Matilda Erickson, the red-haired Swedish immigrant girl who worked as a cook at various enterprises undertaken by members of the Haggberg families. She worked at John Haggberg's Mill, at Al Haggberg's Boarding House, at The Haggberg Hotel in Isle, and probably several other places. The sawmill, near the center of the community, was in fact already known as the Red Top Saw Mill. There are those who disagree that the town is named after Olivia Erickson or the mill and claim it is named after the redtop grass that grows in the area. The fact remains that Olivia's nickname was Redtop. Positive proof of the origin of Red Top's name is gone forever, since the Soo Line discarded the original survey notes in the early 1960s. Ultimately Olivia Erickson married Julius Olson, and moved to the Pine City area, where she lived to age 90 and a month.

=== Early Days ===
The first building in Red Top was the Haggberg Store in the fall of 1908, which also became home to the Red Top Post Office in the spring of 1909. Soon to follow were a Railroad Depot, Hotel and Restaurant, the Kalberg Store (with auto sales, too!), a Freight Warehouse, Norwegian Lutheran Church, Stockyard, American Legion Hall, several other buildings, and a number of houses. District 70, the Red Top School District actually predates the community and was on property donated by Richard Lewis a half mile from the center of the community.

The people who lived around Red Top were mostly first and second generation immigrants, very often from Scandinavia, worked hard and didn't have much money. That's not to say there was no humor! There were pranks and kidding around, often in the face of adversity. During one of the Influenza epidemics of the late ‘teens, Rudolph Haggberg walked into the hotel and announced, “I’ve brought a flu stop today!” Everyone looked to see, and sure enough, it was! (The metal cover for a chimney flue!)

When the Moose Lake Fire was raging in 1918, the people of Red Top were greatly concerned. The Soo Line had a relief train standing by in McGrath in case evacuation became necessary. Many residents dug holes in their yards to bury valuables in the event they had to leave. To this day, depressions in the ground where some of these holes were can still be seen. A welcome rainstorm finally put out the fire.

Red Top nearly had a town square park, located on Main Street across from Hanson's Hotel. It was next to the Kalberg Store and in fact was partly on land owned by John Kalberg. Some of the park area was on the wide alley between the Soo Line right of way and Kalberg's land. There was a huge stone and concrete flagpole stand in the park with a tall tamarack flagpole in it. The old flagpole stand today lies cracked and broken in the bottom of the pit—the only reminder of the park that's left.

The East Side Telephone Company entered Red Top in 1909 with a 37 unit farm line that ran from the exchange at Opstead to Eastwood, Red Top, Isle, and Wahkon. There the line connected with the Minnesota Telephone Company.

In 1948 and 1949, Red Top residents were pleased to receive electric power from North Pine Electric Cooperative Association.

Red Top, much to everyone's surprise, had sort of an airport in the 1940s. It was simply the field on the north side of town. A wind sock on a tamarack pole was the “control tower.” Much to the consternation of Oscar Anderson, the flight path was directly over his store. Arnold Pinz and Henry Paulson among others, flew in and out from Red Top.

=== Modern times ===
The first two businesses were also the last two businesses, as the Red Top store closed in the early 1950s, and the Post Office finally shut down in April 1954.

Ultimately, Red Top lost one last thing: The Soo Line Railroad. There is some irony in this. The railroad was the only reason Red Top ever existed in the first place. Losing the Depot in 1917 to Isle was the start of the decline of the community. It caused resentment in the people of both Red Top and Isle. Years later, no one would have a railroad at all. The rails were torn out of Red Top in June 1992.

In the end, after the timber ran out, after the crop farmers gave up raising potatoes, and after the automobile made it possible to travel more easily, there was no need for small towns that were very close together. Not being near the lake or on a major highway, Red Top was one of the first to wither. Red Top faded as a town, but it always was a community. It was never incorporated, and never had a city government. Red Top has survived and still is a community, as well as being a surrounding community of the nearby city of Isle. It will likely remain as long as there are people there to remember.

Communities also along the Soo Brooten Line

- Arthyde
- Solana
- McGrath
- Isle
- Wahkon
- Onamia

This information is provided by the author of: Track and Timber the History of Red Top Minnesota And is used by permission with the close editing of the author of the previously mentioned book.
