= Aiken County =

Aiken County can refer to

- Aiken County, South Carolina
- Aiken County, Minnesota: former name of Aitkin County, Minnesota
