= Giese, Minnesota =

Unincorporated community in Minnesota, US

Giese
- Unincorporated community
- Location within Minnesota Location within the United States
- Coordinates: 46°12′58″N 93°07′00″W
- Country: United States
- State: Minnesota
- County: Aitkin
- Township: Wagner Township
- Elevation: 1,273 ft (388 m)
- Time zone: UTC-6 (Central (CST))
  - Summer (DST): UTC-5 (CDT)
- ZIP code: 55735
- Area code: 320
- GNIS feature ID: 644122

Giese (/ˈɡiːzi/ GHEE-zee) is an unincorporated community in Wagner Township, Aitkin County, Minnesota, United States, located near Finlayson.

The community is located in east-central Minnesota at the junction of State Highway 18 (MN 18) and Aitkin County Road 23 (130th Place). Giese is near the southeast corner of Aitkin County, near the county line with Pine County. Big Pine Lake is nearby.

== History ==
Originally Henkeltown, the Henkel family sold the only store in town to the Giese clan. The community had a post office from 1918 to 1953. Giese was named for George F. Giese, a local businessman and the first postmaster.
