= Rabey, Minnesota =

Unincorporated community in Minnesota, US

Rabey
- Unincorporated community
- Location within Minnesota Location within the United States
- Coordinates: 46°59′55″N 93°22′35″W
- Country: United States
- State: Minnesota
- County: Aitkin
- Elevation: 1,266 ft (386 m)
- Time zone: UTC-6 (Central (CST))
  - Summer (DST): UTC-5 (CDT)
- ZIP code: 55744
- Area code: 218
- GNIS feature ID: 2070920

Rabey is an unincorporated community in Aitkin County, Minnesota, United States, within the Savanna State Forest. The community is located between Hill City and Jacobson along State Highway 200 (MN 200) near Rabey Road (250th Avenue) and Elliot Road. Rabey is located within Northwest Aitkin Unorganized Territory of Aitkin County.

== History ==
The community had a post office from 1913 to 1941. Rabey at one time had a railroad station and a large mercantile store.
