= Waukenabo, Minnesota =

Unincorporated community in Minnesota, US

Waukenabo
- Unincorporated community
- Location within Minnesota Location within the United States
- Coordinates: 46°44′24″N 93°36′01″W
- Country: United States
- State: Minnesota
- County: Aitkin
- Township: Waukenabo Township
- Elevation: 1,247 ft (380 m)
- Time zone: UTC-6 (Central (CST))
  - Summer (DST): UTC-5 (CDT)
- ZIP code: 56469
- Area code: 218
- GNIS feature ID: 653853

Waukenabo is an unincorporated community in Waukenabo Township, Aitkin County, Minnesota, United States; located near Palisade.

The community is located between Aitkin and Hill City at the junction of U.S. Highway 169 and 500th Lane.

Aitkin County Road 3 (Grove Street / 480th Street) is nearby.

Waukenabo is located within ZIP code 56469, based in Palisade. A post office previously operated in Waukenabo from 1902 to 1916.
