= Hill River State Forest =

State Forest in Aitkin County, Minnesota

- Location within Minnesota
- Interactive map of Hill River State Forest

Geography
- Location: Aitkin County, Minnesota, United States
- Coordinates: 46°29′31″N 93°24′38″W
- Elevation: 1,371 feet (418 m)
- Area: 124,204 acres (50,264 ha)

Administration
- Established: 1963
- Authority: Minnesota DNR
- Website: www.dnr.state.mn.us/state_forests/sft00024/index.html

Ecology
- WWF Classification: Western Great Lakes Forests
- EPA Classification: Northern Lakes and Forests
- Dominant tree species: Northern hardwoods

The Hill River State Forest is a state forest located in Aitkin County, Minnesota. It borders the Savanna State Forest to the east, and the Chippewa National Forest and the Land O'Lakes State Forest to the west. The majority of the forest is managed by the Minnesota Department of Natural Resources.

Northern hardwoods, such as red maple, red oak, green ash, elm, and basswood, dominate the forest cover of the forest. Aspen and paper birch are also common on the upland sites. Black spruce, tamarack, and cedar are common on the wetter lowland areas in the forest.

The abundance of lakes in the forest were formed during the Wisconsin glaciation, and make boating, swimming, canoeing, and kayaking popular recreation activities. Additionally, the Willow River, Moose River, and Little Hill River all traverse the forest. Campgrounds, backcountry camping, and picnick facilities are available in the forest. Outdoor recreational activities include 10 miles (16 km) trails for hiking, 7 miles (11 km) available for Class I and II all-terrain vehicle and dirt biking, and snowmobiling.

== See also ==
- List of Minnesota state forests
