= Rossburg, Minnesota =

Unincorporated community in Minnesota, US

Rossburg
- Unincorporated community
- Location within Minnesota Location within the United States
- Coordinates: 46°32′07″N 93°34′48″W
- Country: United States
- State: Minnesota
- County: Aitkin
- Township: Spencer Township
- Elevation: 1,240 ft (380 m)
- Time zone: UTC-6 (Central (CST))
  - Summer (DST): UTC-5 (CDT)
- ZIP code: 56431
- Area code: 218
- GNIS feature ID: 654917

Rossburg is an unincorporated community in Spencer Township, Aitkin County, Minnesota, United States. The community is located along 350th Avenue near the junction with Aitkin County Road 5, 360th Street. Nearby places include Aitkin, Glen, and Kimberly. State Highway 47 (MN 47) is nearby.

== History ==
The community had a post office from 1901 to 1937. The post office was first located in postmaster Luigi Digiovanni's store.
