= Jewett, Minnesota =

Unorganized territory in Aitkin County, Minnesota, United States

Coordinates: 46°22′34″N 93°22′24″W

- Unorganized territory
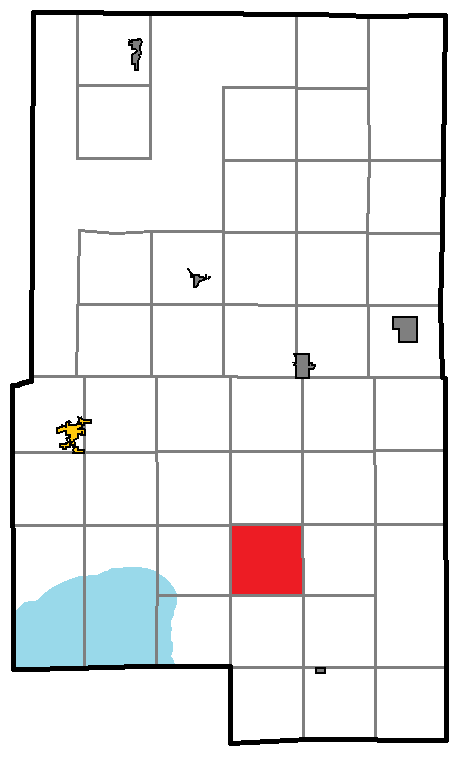
- Location of Jewett within Aitkin County, Minnesota
- Country: United States
- State: Minnesota
- County: Aitkin

Area
  - Total: 35.38 sq mi (91.6 km^{2})
  - Land: 35.28 sq mi (91.4 km^{2})
  - Water: 0.10 sq mi (0.26 km^{2})

Population (2020)
  - Total: 45
  - Density: 1.3/sq mi (0.49/km^{2})
- Time zone: UTC-6 (Central (CST))
  - Summer (DST): UTC-5 (CDT)
- Area code: 320

Jewett is an unorganized territory in Aitkin County, Minnesota, United States. The population was 45 at the 2020 census.

== History ==
Jewett was named for D. M. Jewett, a pioneer settler.

== Geography ==
According to the United States Census Bureau, the unorganized territory has a total area of 35.4 square miles (91.6 km^{2}), of which 35.3 square miles (91.4 km^{2}) is land and 0.12 square miles (0.3 km^{2}), or 0.29%, is water.

== Demographics ==
At the 2000 census there were 46 people, 17 households, and 12 families in the unorganized territory. The population density was 1.3 inhabitants per square mile (0.50/km^{2}). There were 26 housing units at an average density of 0.7 per square mile (0.27/km^{2}). The racial makeup of the unorganized territory was 100.00% White. Of the 17 households 47.1% had children under the age of 18 living with them, 58.8% were married couples living together, 5.9% had a female householder with no husband present, and 29.4% were non-families. 29.4% of households were one person and 23.5% were one person aged 65 or older. The average household size was 2.71 and the average family size was 3.42.

The age distribution was 41.3% under the age of 18, 34.8% from 25 to 44, 6.5% from 45 to 64, and 17.4% 65 or older. The median age was 32 years. For every 100 females, there were 91.7 males. For every 100 females age 18 and over, there were 80.0 males.

The median household income was $34,375 and the median family income was $45,417. Males had a median income of $16,250 versus $20,000 for females. The per capita income for the unorganized territory was $18,003. There were no families and 5.1% of the population living below the poverty line, including no under eighteens and 16.7% of those over 64.
