= Libby, Minnesota =

Unincorporated community in Minnesota, US

Libby
- Unincorporated community
- Location within Minnesota Location within the United States
- Coordinates: 46°47′03″N 93°19′31″W
- Country: United States
- State: Minnesota
- County: Aitkin
- Township: Libby Township
- Elevation: 1,220 ft (370 m)
- Time zone: UTC-6 (Central (CST))
  - Summer (DST): UTC-5 (CDT)
- ZIP code: 55760 and 56469
- Area code: 218
- GNIS feature ID: 646630

Libby is an unincorporated community in Libby Township, Aitkin County, Minnesota, United States. The community is located between McGregor and Jacobson along State Highway 65 (MN 65). The Mississippi River flows nearby. Libby is located immediately northwest of Big Sandy Lake.

Nearby places include Palisade, McGregor, Tamarack, Jacobson, Ball Bluff, and Savanna Portage State Park.

Libby is located 13 miles north of McGregor, and 16 miles south of Jacobson.

Aitkin Lake is located near Libby, stocked with black bullhead, black crappie, bluegill, brown bullhead, hybrid sunfish, largemouth bass, northern pike, pumpkinseed, tullibee (cisco), walleye, yellow bullhead, yellow perch, bowfin (dogfish), shorthead redhorse, white sucker, golden shiner and minnow.

The community had a post office from 1891 to 1953.
