= Elm Island Lake =

Lake in the state of Minnesota, United States

- Location within Minnesota
- Location: Aitkin County, Minnesota
- Coordinates: 46°27′33″N 93°37′32″W
- Type: lake

Elm Island Lake is a lake in Aitkin County, Minnesota, in the United States. It was named for the lake island it contains where elm trees grow.

== See also ==
- List of lakes in Minnesota
