= Nordland Township, Aitkin County, Minnesota =

Township in Minnesota, United States

Nordland Township
- Township
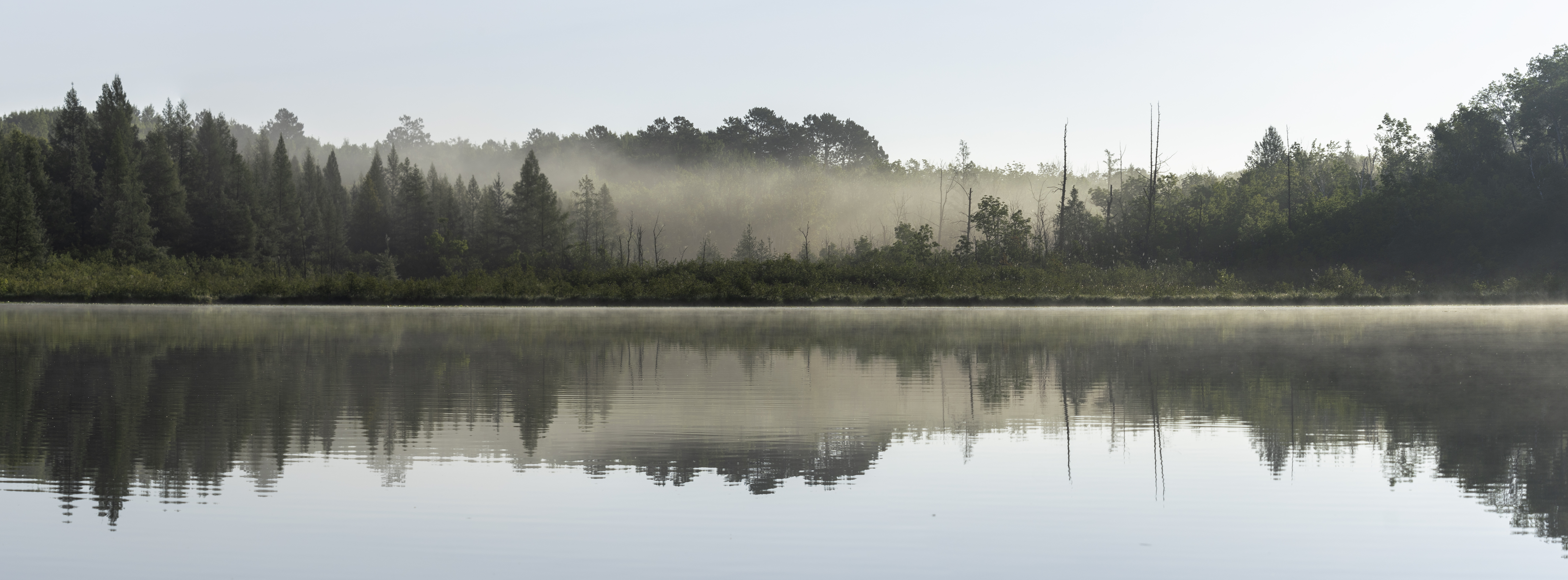
- Lingroth Lake

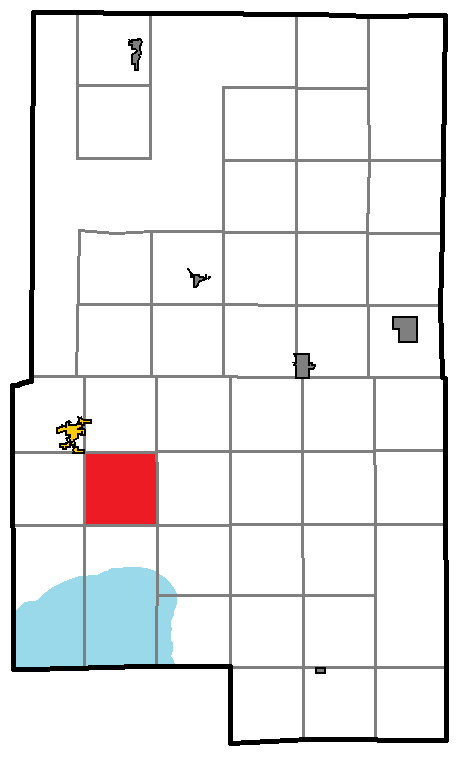
- Location of Nordland Township, within Aitkin County, Minnesota
- Coordinates: 46°28′13″N 93°37′23″W
- Country: United States
- State: Minnesota
- County: Aitkin

Area
  - Total: 36.7 sq mi (95.0 km^{2})
  - Land: 31.2 sq mi (80.7 km^{2})
  - Water: 5.5 sq mi (14.3 km^{2})
- Elevation: 1,257 ft (383 m)

Population (2020)
  - Total: 983
  - Density: 31.5/sq mi (12.2/km^{2})
- Time zone: UTC-6 (Central (CST))
  - Summer (DST): UTC-5 (CDT)
- FIPS code: 27-46546
- GNIS feature ID: 0665134

Nordland Township is a township in Aitkin County, Minnesota, United States. The population was 983 as of the 2020 census.

== History ==
Nordland Township was named after Nordland, a county in Norway. One property within the township is listed on the National Register of Historic Places: the 1897 Bethlehem Lutheran Church.

== Geography ==
According to the United States Census Bureau, the township has a total area of 36.7 square miles (95.0 km^{2}), of which 31.2 square miles (80.7 km^{2}) is land and 5.5 square miles (14.3 km^{2}), or 15.02%, is water.

=== Major highway ===
- Minnesota State Highway 47

=== Lakes ===
- Edquist Lake
- Elm Island Lake
- Linde Lake
- Lingroth Lake
- Little Ripple Lake
- Lake Four
- Lone Lake
- Monson Lake
- Nord Lake
- Raspberry Lake
- Ripple Lake (vast majority)
- Section Twelve Lake
- Section Twenty-Five Lake
- Seth Lake (vast majority)
- Sisabagamah Lake (south half)
- Sissabagamah Lake
- Sixteen Lake
- Sjodin Lake
- Soderman Lakes
- Soderman Lakes (southeast three-quarters)
- Sweetman Lake
- Thirty-One Lake (west edge)
- Turtle Lake (west three-quarters)
- Wladimiraf Lake

=== Adjacent townships ===
- Spencer Township (north)
- Kimberly Township (northeast)
- Glen Township (east)
- Malmo Township (southeast)
- Wealthwood Township (south)
- Hazelton Township (southwest)
- Farm Island Township (west)
- Aitkin Township (northwest)

=== Cemeteries ===
The township contains these two cemeteries: Bethlehem Lutheran and Glory Baptist.

== Demographics ==
As of the census of 2000, there were 853 people, 366 households, and 289 families residing in the township. The population density was 27.3 inhabitants per square mile (10.5/km^{2}). There were 825 housing units at an average density of 26.4 per square mile (10.2/km^{2}). The racial makeup of the township was 98.01% White, 0.35% African American, 0.70% Native American, 0.35% Asian, 0.23% from other races, and 0.35% from two or more races. Hispanic or Latino of any race were 0.35% of the population.

There were 366 households, out of which 23.0% had children under the age of 18 living with them, 73.0% were married couples living together, 3.6% had a female householder with no husband present, and 21.0% were non-families. 17.2% of all households were made up of individuals, and 9.3% had someone living alone who was 65 years of age or older. The average household size was 2.33 and the average family size was 2.61.

In the township the population was spread out, with 19.0% under the age of 18, 3.2% from 18 to 24, 19.5% from 25 to 44, 34.5% from 45 to 64, and 23.9% who were 65 years of age or older. The median age was 50 years. For every 100 females, there were 100.2 males. For every 100 females age 18 and over, there were 97.4 males.

The median income for a household in the township was $41,172, and the median income for a family was $44,205. Males had a median income of $35,673 versus $20,313 for females. The per capita income for the township was $18,742. About 4.5% of families and 7.6% of the population were below the poverty line, including 14.4% of those under age 18 and 8.3% of those age 65 or over.
