= Swatara, Minnesota =

Unincorporated community in Minnesota, US

Swatara
- Unincorporated community
- Location within Minnesota Location within the United States
- Coordinates: 46°53′44″N 93°40′27″W
- Country: United States
- State: Minnesota
- County: Aitkin
- Township: Macville Township
- Elevation: 1,299 ft (396 m)
- Time zone: UTC-6 (Central (CST))
  - Summer (DST): UTC-5 (CDT)
- ZIP code: 55785
- Area code: 218
- GNIS feature ID: 658572

Swatara is an unincorporated community in Macville Township, Aitkin County, Minnesota, United States. Although unincorporated, Swatara has a post office with the ZIP code 55785.

== History ==
The community at one time was served by the Soo Line Railroad and had a railroad station.

Swatara and neighboring townships were considered as a potential location of the Minnesota Experimental City that was proposed by scientist Athelstan Spilhaus in the 1970s. The city was envisioned to house 250,000 people and would use experimental technologies and methodologies such as moving walkways and monorail systems for transportation and a transparent dome encapsulating the city.

Despite support from state legislature, and prominent companies such as Ford, Boeing, and Honeywell, Aitkin County residents pushed back against the proposed city, citing environmental concerns as well as concerns about changing their way of life. The newly formed Minnesota Pollution Control Agency voted to abandon the project in 1973.

== Geography ==
Swatara is located along Aitkin County Road 7 (610th Street) near the junction with County Road 29 (Osprey Avenue). Nearby places include Hill City, Remer, and Haypoint. U.S. 169 is nearby. Swatara is located in the northwest part of Aitkin County. It is seven miles southwest of Hill City.

== Notable Residents ==
The Heath Family (Art, Earl, and Harvey): Early pioneers who opened the town’s prominent general and hardware store in 1911, serving the early logging and homesteading population.

Terry Mejdrich: A local math teacher and resident who became a prominent local voice during the early 1970s opposing the ambitious, highly controversial "Minnesota Experimental City" (MXC) project proposed for the Swatara area.

Mrs. Maggie Skinaway: Was an early resident and was married to Thomas Skinaway of the prominent Skinaway family with in the regional Anishinaabe community. She was a native medicine women widely known for her extensive knowledge of traditional medicinal roots and herbs.

Dave Olausen : Was an early member of the Lamont Cranston Band.
