= Davidson, Minnesota =

Unorganized territory of Aitkin County, Minnesota, United States

Coordinates: 47°52′36″N 96°50′50″W

- Unorganized territory
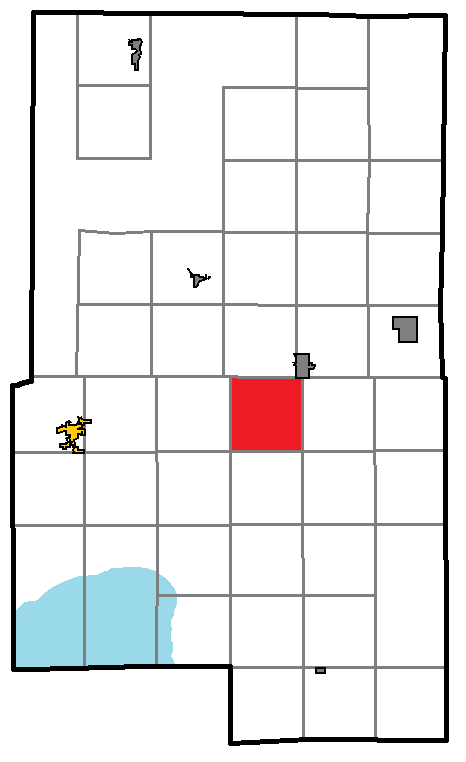
- Location of Davidson within Aitkin County, Minnesota
- Country: United States
- State: Minnesota
- County: Aitkin

Area
  - Total: 37.36 sq mi (96.8 km^{2})
  - Land: 32.11 sq mi (83.2 km^{2})
  - Water: 5.25 sq mi (13.6 km^{2})

Population (2020)
  - Total: 42
  - Density: 1.3/sq mi (0.51/km^{2})
- Time zone: UTC-6 (Central (CST))
  - Summer (DST): UTC-5 (CDT)
- Area code: 218

Davidson is an unorganized territory in Aitkin County, Minnesota, United States. The population was 42 at the 2020 census.

== History ==
Davidson is named for A. D. Davidson, an early prominent landowner.

== Geography ==
According to the United States Census Bureau, the unorganized territory has a total area of 37.3 square miles (96.7 km^{2}), of which 32.1 square miles (83.1 km^{2}) is land and 5.3 square miles (13.6 km^{2}), or 14.06%, is water.

== Demographics ==
At the 2000 census there were 57 people, 28 households, and 21 families in the unorganized territory. The population density was 1.8 inhabitants per square mile (0.69/km^{2}). There were 54 housing units at an average density of 1.7 per square mile (0.66/km^{2}). The racial makeup of the unorganized territory was 96.49% White, 1.75% Native American, and 1.75% from two or more races. Hispanic or Latino of any race were 1.75%.

Of the 28 households 25.0% had children under the age of 18 living with them, 53.6% were married couples living together, 14.3% had a female householder with no husband present, and 25.0% were non-families. 21.4% of households were one person and 14.3% were one person aged 65 or older. The average household size was 2.04 and the average family size was 2.29.

The age distribution was 14.0% under the age of 18, 5.3% from 18 to 24, 26.3% from 25 to 44, 36.8% from 45 to 64, and 17.5% 65 or older. The median age was 48 years. For every 100 females, there were 111.1 males. For every 100 females age 18 and over, there were 104.2 males.

The median household income was $23,438 and the median family income was $30,000. Males had a median income of $36,250 versus $19,375 for females. The per capita income for the unorganized territory was $18,886. There were 8.3% of families and 11.0% of the population living below the poverty line, including 28.6% of under eighteens and 20.0% of those over 64.
