= Cutler, Minnesota =

Unincorporated community in Minnesota, US

Cutler
- Unincorporated community
- Location within Minnesota Location within the United States
- Coordinates: 46°21′30″N 93°45′27″W
- Country: United States
- State: Minnesota
- County: Aitkin
- Township: Hazelton Township
- Elevation: 1,273 ft (388 m)
- Time zone: UTC-6 (Central (CST))
  - Summer (DST): UTC-5 (CDT)
- ZIP code: 56431
- Area code: 218
- GNIS feature ID: 1989117

Cutler is an unincorporated community in Hazelton Township, Aitkin County, Minnesota, United States. The community is located between Garrison and Aitkin along U.S. Highway 169 near 240th Street.
