= Bennettville, Minnesota =

Unincorporated community in Minnesota, US

Bennettville
- Unincorporated community
- Location within Minnesota Location within the United States
- Coordinates: 46°24′07″N 93°44′56″W
- Country: United States
- State: Minnesota
- County: Aitkin
- Township: Hazelton Township
- Elevation: 1,266 ft (386 m)
- Time zone: UTC-6 (Central (CST))
  - Summer (DST): UTC-5 (CDT)
- ZIP code: 56431
- Area code: 218
- GNIS feature ID: 639928

Bennettville is an unincorporated community in Hazelton Township, Aitkin County, Minnesota, United States. The community is located between Garrison and Aitkin along U.S. Highway 169 near the junction with 270th Street and Aitkin County Road 11, Tame Fish Lake Road.
