= William Alexander Aitken =

Scottish fur trader in St. Louis, USA (1785–1851)

William Alexander Aitken, also known as William Alexander Aitkin (c. 1785–1851), was a fur trader with the Ojibwe in the Upper Mississippi region. He was at first affiliated with the American Fur Company, founded by John Jacob Astor, but after 1838 he set up as an independent trader, based in St. Louis, Missouri.

== Biography ==
Aitken was a native of Edinburgh, Scotland. He came to the Upper Mississippi region around 1802 after immigrating to Canada. There he was employed by John Drew, a trader in the Mackinac area. Aitken worked as a clerk in John Jacob Astor's American Fur Company; he was assigned to William Morrison's Fond du Lac Department.

In 1831, Aitken became the Department's chief trader, establishing his headquarters at Sandy Lake, Minnesota. He had trading posts in the Fond du Lac District, which went as far to the west as Pembina, North Dakota, to the north as Rainy Lake, and to the south below the mouth of the Crow Wing River. In 1836 he had a major disagreement with Ramsay Crooks. Their dealings became negative, and in 1838 he was discharged for mismanagement.

Aitken set up in competition as an independent trader on the Upper Mississippi, based in St. Louis, Missouri. He died 16 September 1851. He was buried on the east bank of the Mississippi opposite to the mouth of the Swan River in Morrison County, Minnesota, where he had a trading post from 1842 until his death.

== Family ==
Aitken had at least six wives:

- Pagoonce, daughter of Chief Broken Tooth
- Mary Ombebewonoquay HOLE-IN-THE-DAY 1815–1893
- Madeline Ermatinger (Beshakwadokwe, or Striped-Cloud; recorded variously as Payshahquodoquay, Pach-a-kwa-dok-we, etc.), daughter of Charles Oakes Ermatinger and Charlotte Katawabide;
- Nu-gu-nay-au-nah-quod;
- Odishkwaagamiikwe (End-of-the-Lake Woman; recorded as O-dish-quah-gah-me-qu[ay]); and
- Julia Quodaince.

He was said to have had a total of 25 children by these wives. His daughter Mathilda Aitken married William Whipple Warren, who became a historian of the Ojibwe.

His son Alfred Aitken was murdered in Minnesota Territory. A suspect was tried for the crime in one of the first trials in the territory.

== Legacy ==
Aitkin County, Minnesota and the city of Aitkin, Minnesota are named after him.
