= Waukenabo Township, Aitkin County, Minnesota =

Township in Minnesota, United States

Waukenabo Township
- Township
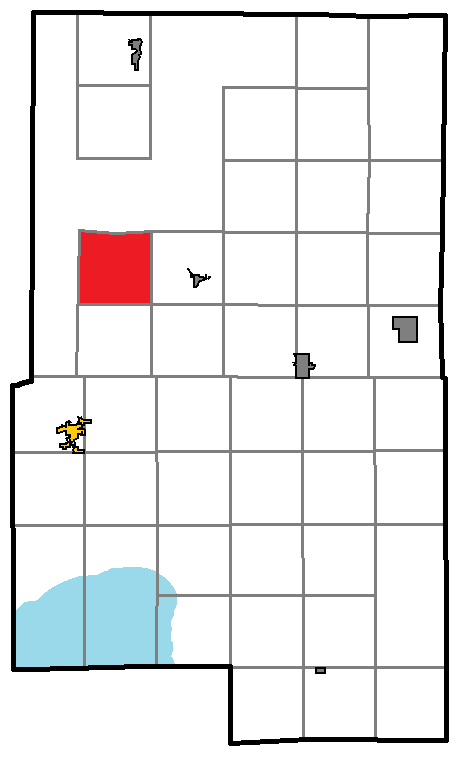
- Location of Waukenabo Township, within Aitkin County, Minnesota
- Coordinates: 46°42′44″N 93°38′53″W
- Country: United States
- State: Minnesota
- County: Aitkin

Area
  - Total: 36.3 sq mi (94.0 km^{2})
  - Land: 33.2 sq mi (86.0 km^{2})
  - Water: 3.1 sq mi (8.0 km^{2})
- Elevation: 1,230 ft (375 m)

Population (2020)
  - Total: 312
  - Density: 9.40/sq mi (3.63/km^{2})
- Time zone: UTC-6 (Central (CST))
  - Summer (DST): UTC-5 (CDT)
- ZIP code: 56469
- Area code: 218
- FIPS code: 27-68692
- GNIS feature ID: 0665938

Waukenabo Township is a township in Aitkin County, Minnesota, United States. The population was 312 as of the 2020 census.

== Geography ==
According to the United States Census Bureau, the township has a total area of 36.3 square miles (94.0 km^{2}), of which 33.2 square miles (86.0 km^{2}) is land and 3.1 square miles (8.0 km^{2}), or 8.47%, is water.

=== Major highway ===
- U.S. Highway 169

=== Lakes ===
- Baker Lake
- East Lake
- Esquagamah Lake (east three-quarters)
- Packer Lake
- Round Lake
- Sitas Lake
- Waukenabo Lake
- West Lake

=== Adjacent townships ===
- Logan Township (east)
- Fleming Township (southeast)
- Morrison Township (south)

=== Cemeteries ===
The township contains Waukenabo Cemetery.

== Demographics ==
As of the census of 2000, there were 340 people, 135 households, and 105 families residing in the township. The population density was 10.3 people per square mile (4.0/km^{2}). There were 429 housing units at an average density of 13.0/sq mi (5.0/km^{2}). The racial makeup of the township was 99.41% White, and 0.59% from two or more races.

There were 135 households, out of which 27.4% had children under the age of 18 living with them, 71.9% were married couples living together, 3.0% had a female householder with no husband present, and 21.5% were non-families. 17.0% of all households were made up of individuals, and 3.7% had someone living alone who was 65 years of age or older. The average household size was 2.52 and the average family size was 2.83.

In the township the population was spread out, with 21.8% under the age of 18, 6.5% from 18 to 24, 20.9% from 25 to 44, 29.7% from 45 to 64, and 21.2% who were 65 years of age or older. The median age was 46 years. For every 100 females, there were 123.7 males. For every 100 females age 18 and over, there were 123.5 males.

The median income for a household in the township was $29,643, and the median income for a family was $30,833. Males had a median income of $36,250 versus $19,327 for females. The per capita income for the township was $13,621. About 15.5% of families and 13.6% of the population were below the poverty line, including 6.3% of those under age 18 and 19.8% of those age 65 or over.
