= Rice River (Mississippi River tributary) =

Coordinates: 46°35′23″N 93°38′04″W

Location
- Country: United States

Physical characteristics
- Source
  - location: Minnesota

The Rice River is a 57.1-mile-long (91.9 km) tributary of the Mississippi River in northern Minnesota, United States. It rises in southeastern Aitkin County at the outlet of Porcupine Lake and flows generally north into Rice Lake National Wildlife Refuge, where it turns west and flows to the Mississippi 5 miles (8 km) northeast of Aitkin.

The Rice River takes its name from the abundant wild rice that once fed Native Americans.

== See also ==
- List of rivers of Minnesota
