= McGrath, Minnesota =

City in Minnesota, United States

- City
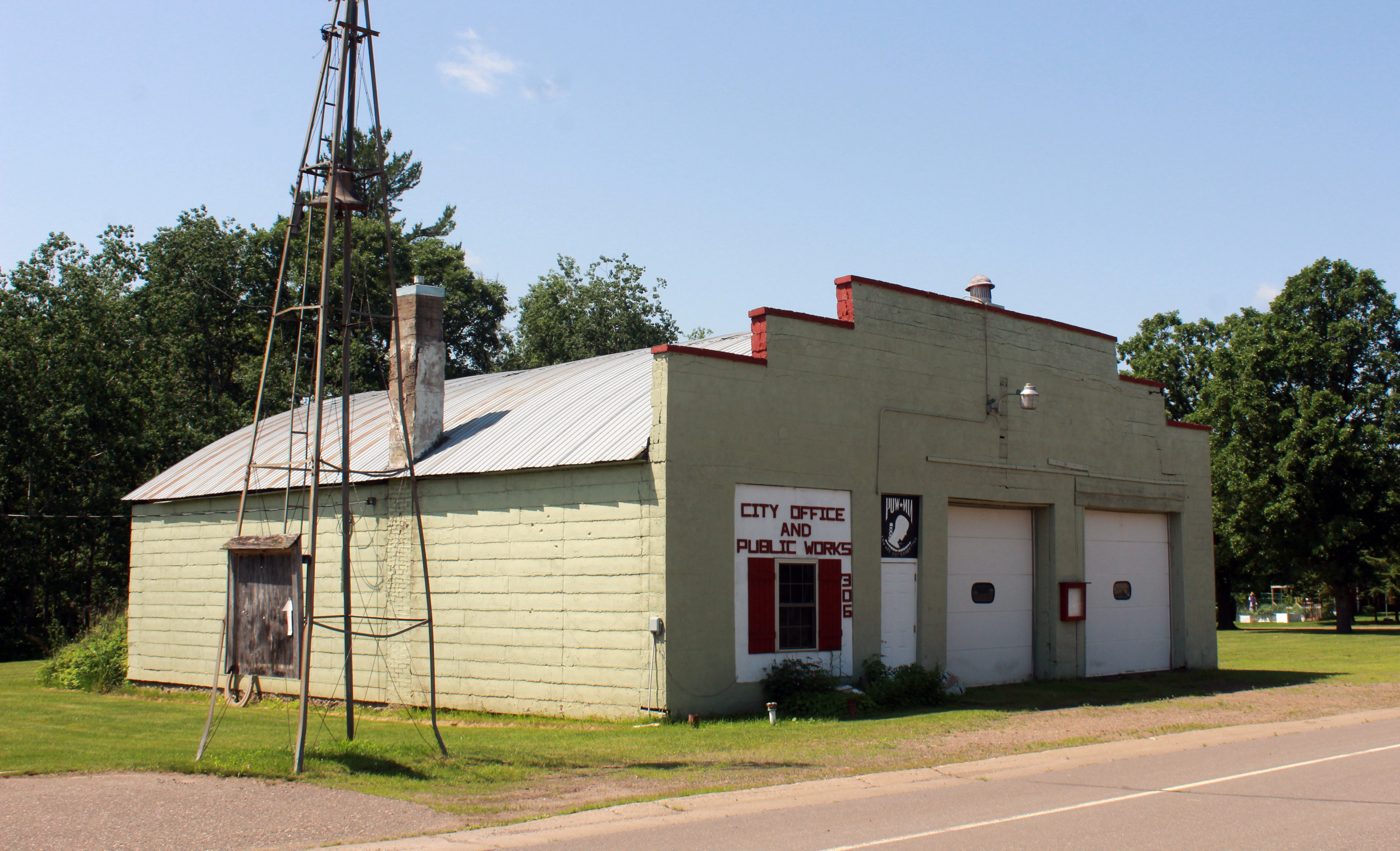
- City Hall and Public Works building

- Location of the city of McGrath within Aitkin County, Minnesota
- Coordinates: 46°14′32″N 93°16′30″W
- Country: United States
- State: Minnesota
- County: Aitkin
- Incorporated: March 23, 1923

Government
  - Mayor: Brian Clark

Area
  - Total: 0.371 sq mi (0.961 km^{2})
  - Land: 0.371 sq mi (0.961 km^{2})
  - Water: 0 sq mi (0.000 km^{2})
- Elevation: 1,234 ft (376 m)

Population (2020)
  - Total: 41
  - Estimate (2022): 42
  - Density: 110.5/sq mi (42.67/km^{2})
- Time zone: UTC−6 (Central (CST))
  - Summer (DST): UTC−5 (CDT)
- ZIP Code: 56350
- Area code: 320
- FIPS code: 27-38996
- GNIS feature ID: 2395067
- Sales tax: 6.875%

McGrath is a city in Aitkin County, Minnesota, United States. The population was 41 at the 2020 census.

== History ==
James E. McGrath, a logger and landowner who had been working the area since 1895, donated 40 acres in 1907 for a town site. The site was platted as Elmwood. When a post office was established in 1908, the site was renamed McGrath after James E. McGrath. McGrath was incorporated in 1923.

== Geography ==
According to the United States Census Bureau, the city has a total area of 0.371 square miles (0.96 km^{2}), all land.

McGrath is located along Minnesota State Highways 27 / 65 (co-signed). State Highway 18 is nearby. Other routes include Aitkin County Road 9, 1st Street.

The Snake River and Bear Creek both flow nearby. The Soo Line ATV Trail is also nearby.

== Demographics ==
Historical population
Census	Pop.	Note	%±
1930	141		—
1940	138		−2.1%
1950	135		−2.2%
1960	96		−28.9%
1970	70		−27.1%
1980	81		15.7%
1990	62		−23.5%
2000	65		4.8%
2010	80		23.1%
2020	41		−48.7%
2022 (est.)	42		2.4%
U.S. Decennial Census; 2020 Census

=== 2010 census ===
As of the 2010 census, there were 80 people, 32 households, and 19 families living in the city. The population density was 222.2 inhabitants per square mile (85.8/km^{2}). There were 48 housing units at an average density of 133.3 per square mile (51.5/km^{2}). The racial makeup of the city was 96.3% White, 1.3% Native American, and 2.5% from two or more races.

There were 32 households, of which 15.6% had children under the age of 18 living with them, 46.9% were married couples living together, 6.3% had a female householder with no husband present, 6.3% had a male householder with no wife present, and 40.6% were non-families. 34.4% of all households were made up of individuals, and 12.5% had someone living alone who was 65 years of age or older. The average household size was 2.16 and the average family size was 2.79.

The median age in the city was 51 years. 11.2% of residents were under the age of 18; 5.2% were between the ages of 18 and 24; 23.8% were from 25 to 44; 30.1% were from 45 to 64; and 30% were 65 years of age or older. The gender makeup of the city was 58.8% male and 41.3% female.

=== 2000 census ===
As of the 2000 census, there were 65 people, 26 households, and 13 families living in the city. The population density was 175.1 inhabitants per square mile (67.6/km^{2}). There were 41 housing units at an average density of 110.4 per square mile (42.6/km^{2}). The racial makeup of the city was 93.85% White, 1.54% African American, 1.54% Asian, and 3.08% from two or more races. Hispanic or Latino of any race were 15.38% of the population. 72.3% were of German, 10.6% Norwegian, 6.4% Czech and 6.4% Danish ancestry.

There were 26 households, out of which 23.1% had children under the age of 18 living with them, 46.2% were married couples living together, 3.8% had a female householder with no husband present, and 50.0% were non-families. 42.3% of all households were made up of individuals, and 15.4% had someone living alone who was 65 years of age or older. The average household size was 2.50 and the average family size was 3.69.

In the city, the population was spread out, with 32.3% under the age of 18, 7.7% from 18 to 24, 23.1% from 25 to 44, 23.1% from 45 to 64, and 13.8% who were 65 years of age or older. The median age was 39 years. For every 100 females, there were 80.6 males. For every 100 females age 18 and over, there were 91.3 males.

The median income for a household in the city was $24,250, and the median income for a family was $23,750. Males had a median income of $23,750 versus $0 for females. The per capita income for the city was $9,540. There were 18.2% of families and 12.7% of the population living below the poverty line, including no under eighteens and none of those over 64.

== Gallery ==
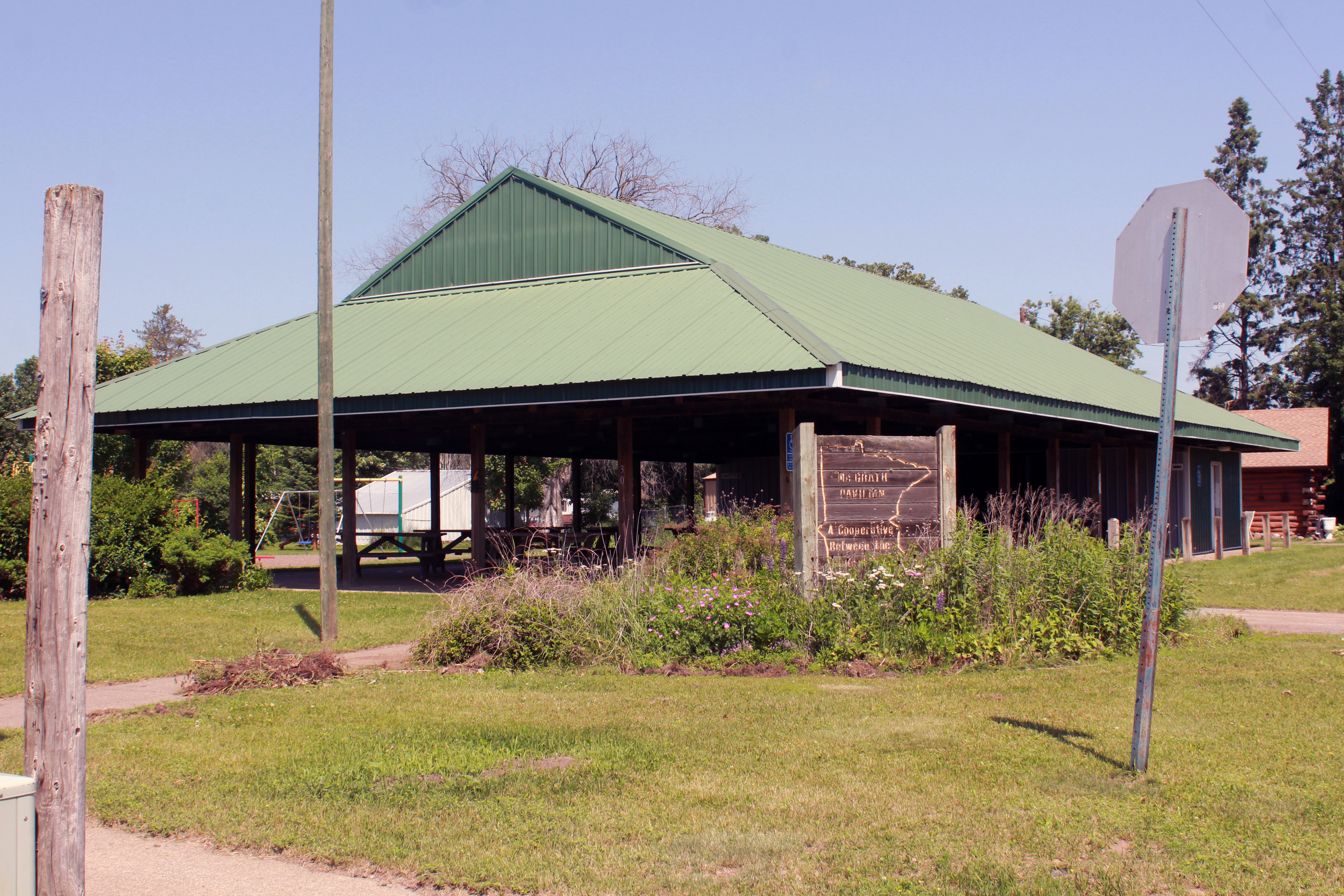
Picnic shelter

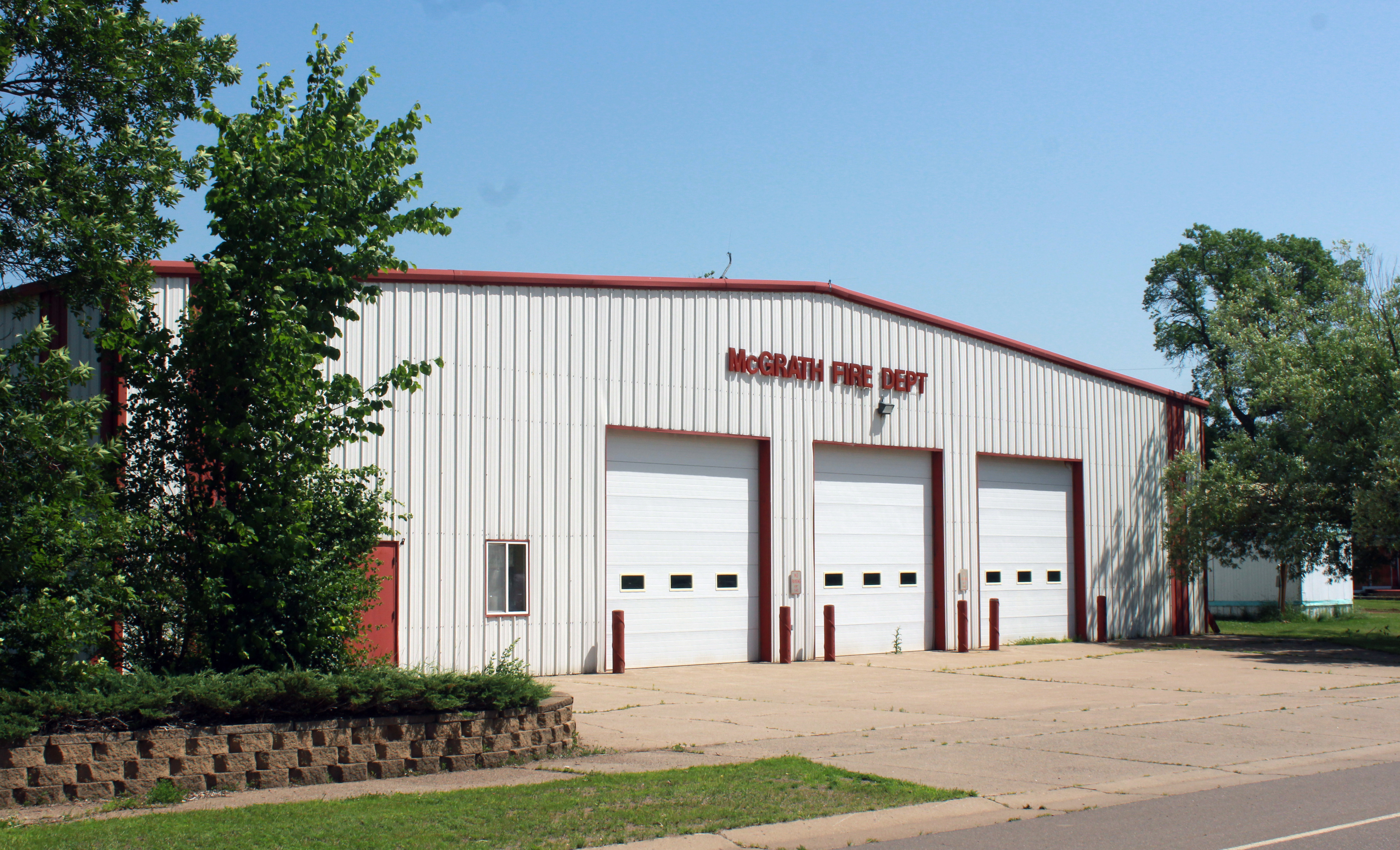
Fire station

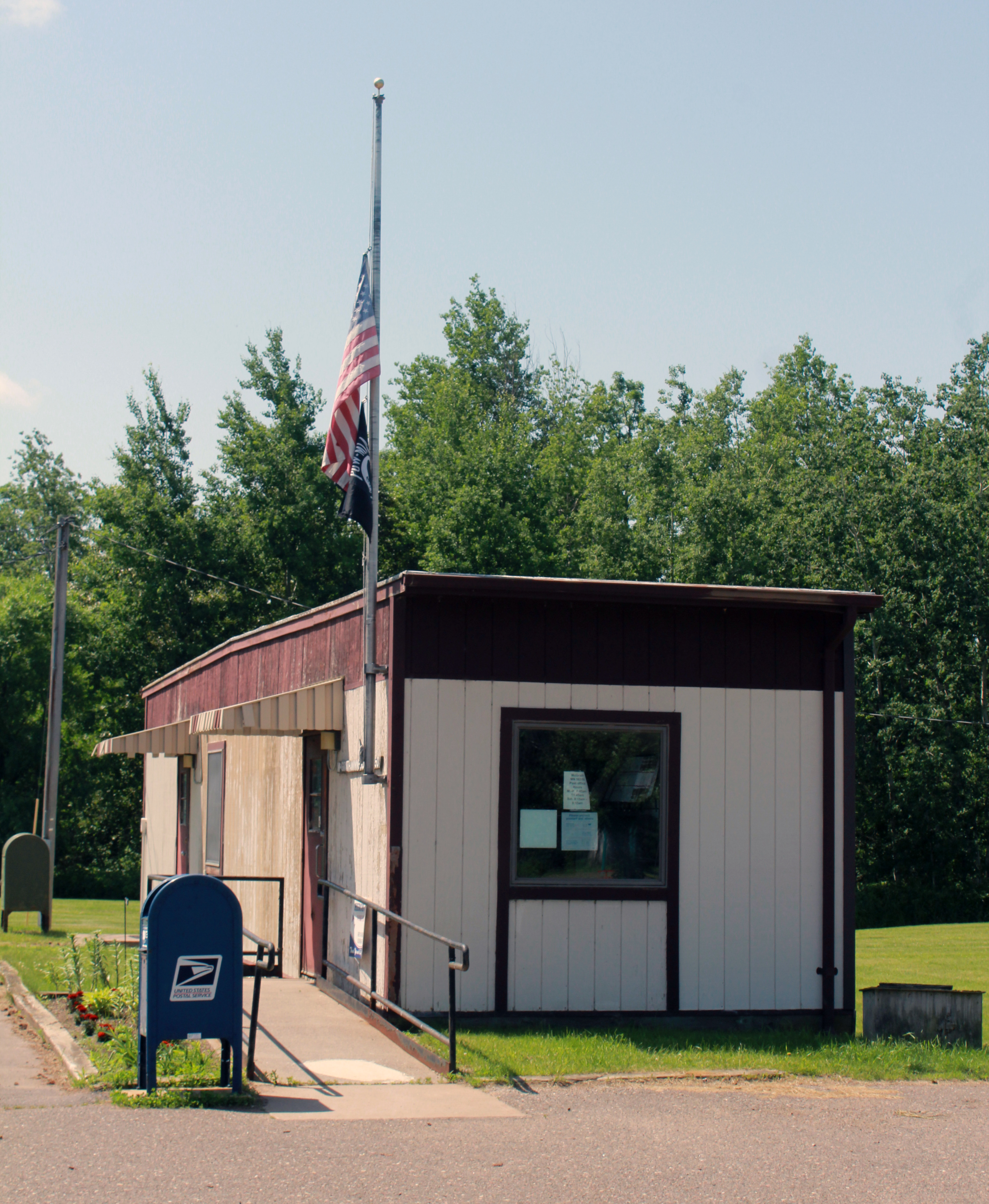
U.S. Post Office
