= Washburn Lake =

Lake in the state of Minnesota, United States

- Location within Minnesota Location within the United States
- Location: Cass County
- Coordinates: 46.870°N 93.995°W
- Type: lake
- Surface area: 1,554 acres (6.29 km^{2})
- Max. depth: 111 feet (34 m)
- Surface elevation: 1,316 feet (401 m)

Washburn Lake is a 1,554 acres (6.29 km^{2}) lake located about three miles northwest of Outing, Minnesota in Cass County, Minnesota, USA. It is found at an elevation of 1,316 feet (401 m). The lake occupies three distinct basins. A public access is co-located at the Clinton Converse DNR Forestry Campground at the south end of the eastern basin. Based on 2009 data, development is considered moderate, with 17.2 homes/cabins per shoreline mile. The maximum depth is 111 feet (34 m) and about 48% of the lake is 15 feet (4.6 m) deep or less. Shallow water substrates consist primarily of sand and gravel, although areas of rubble, boulders and muck are also present. The aquatic plant community is quite diverse and is critical to maintaining healthy fish populations. Emergent plants such as bulrush are common along much of the shoreline, however just as common are numerous gaps in these beds along shorelines with developed lots. The remaining emergent plants should be protected as they are important for shoreline protection, maintaining water quality, and providing essential spawning habitat for bass and panfish species. Submerged plants provide food and cover needed by fish and other aquatic species.

Washburn Lake was named for an early lumberman.
