= Macville Township, Aitkin County, Minnesota =

Township in Minnesota, United States

Macville Township
- Township
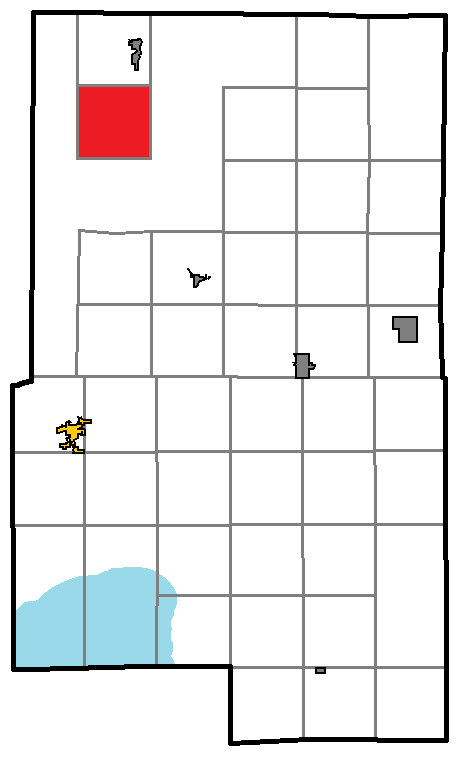
- Location of Macville Township, within Aitkin County, Minnesota
- Coordinates: 46°53′40″N 93°38′30″W
- Country: United States
- State: Minnesota
- County: Aitkin

Area
  - Total: 36.5 sq mi (94.5 km^{2})
  - Land: 36.2 sq mi (93.7 km^{2})
  - Water: 0.31 sq mi (0.8 km^{2})
- Elevation: 1,276 ft (389 m)

Population (2020)
  - Total: 170
  - Density: 4.7/sq mi (1.8/km^{2})
- Time zone: UTC-6 (Central (CST))
  - Summer (DST): UTC-5 (CDT)
- FIPS code: 27-39212
- GNIS feature ID: 0664867

Macville Township is a township in Aitkin County, Minnesota, United States. The population was 170 at the 2020 census.

== Geography ==
According to the United States Census Bureau, the township has a total area of 36.5 square miles (94.5 km^{2}), of which 36.2 square miles (93.7 km^{2}) is land and 0.31 square miles (0.8 km^{2}), or 0.87%, is water.

=== Major highway ===
- U.S. Highway 169

=== Lakes ===
- Kangas Lake
- Wolf Lake

=== Adjacent townships ===
- Hill Lake Township (north)

=== Cemeteries ===
The township contains Macville Cemetery.

== Demographics ==
As of the census of 2000, there were 204 people, 77 households, and 51 families residing in the township. The population density was 5.6 inhabitants per square mile (2.2/km^{2}). There were 107 housing units at an average density of 3.0 per square mile (1.2/km^{2}). The racial makeup of the township was 97.06% White, 1.47% African American and 1.47% Native American. Hispanic or Latino of any race were 0.49% of the population.

There were 77 households, out of which 29.9% had children under the age of 18 living with them, 51.9% were married couples living together, 7.8% had a female householder with no husband present, and 32.5% were non-families. 29.9% of all households were made up of individuals, and 9.1% had someone living alone who was 65 years of age or older. The average household size was 2.65 and the average family size was 3.29.

In the township the population was spread out, with 30.9% under the age of 18, 6.4% from 18 to 24, 28.4% from 25 to 44, 23.0% from 45 to 64, and 11.3% who were 65 years of age or older. The median age was 39 years. For every 100 females, there were 106.1 males. For every 100 females age 18 and over, there were 110.4 males.

The median income for a household in the township was $28,750, and the median income for a family was $31,875. Males had a median income of $24,531 versus $17,500 for females. The per capita income for the township was $13,859. About 19.6% of families and 28.5% of the population were below the poverty line, including 41.7% of those under the age of eighteen and 24.0% of those 65 or over.

== See also ==
- Macsville Township, Grant County, Minnesota
