= Northwest Aitkin, Minnesota =

Unorganized territory of Aitkin County, Minnesota, United States

Coordinates: 46°50′28″N 93°36′12″W

- Unorganized territory
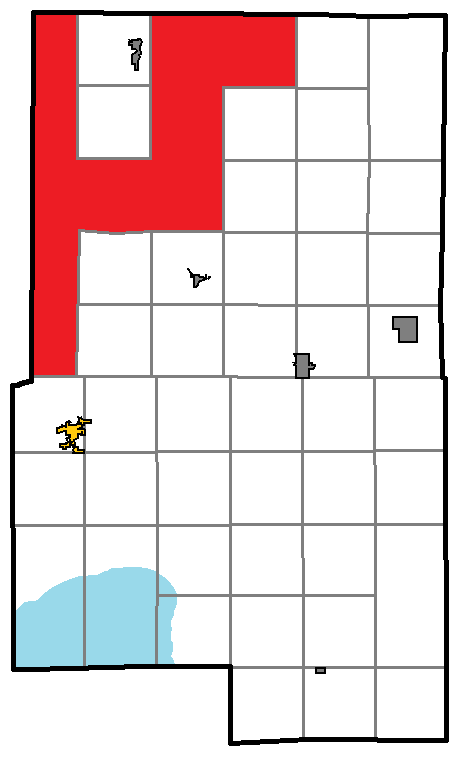
- Location of Northwest Aitkin within Aitkin County, Minnesota
- Country: United States
- State: Minnesota
- County: Aitkin

Area
  - Total: 292.0 sq mi (756 km^{2})
  - Land: 287.86 sq mi (745.6 km^{2})
  - Water: 5.14 sq mi (13.3 km^{2})

Population (2020)
  - Total: 355
  - Density: 1.23/sq mi (0.476/km^{2})
- Time zone: UTC-6 (Central (CST))
  - Summer (DST): UTC-5 (CDT)
- Area code: 218

Northwest Aitkin is an unorganized territory in Aitkin County, Minnesota, United States. The population was 355 at the 2020 census.

== Geography ==
According to the United States Census Bureau, the unorganized territory has a total area of 293.0 square miles (758.8 km^{2}), of which 287.8 square miles (745.5 km^{2}) is land and 5.1 square miles (13.2 km^{2}), or 1.75%, is water.

== Demographics ==
At the 2000 census there were 335 people, 125 households, and 101 families in the unorganized territory. The population density was 1.2 inhabitants per square mile (0.46/km^{2}). There were 289 housing units at an average density of 1.0 per square mile (0.39/km^{2}). The racial makeup of the unorganized territory was 97.31% White, 0.90% Native American, and 1.79% from two or more races. Hispanic or Latino of any race were 2.09%.

Of the 125 households 26.4% had children under the age of 18 living with them, 72.8% were married couples living together, 7.2% had a female householder with no husband present, and 18.4% were non-families. 15.2% of households were one person and 7.2% were one person aged 65 or older. The average household size was 2.68 and the average family size was 2.98.

The age distribution was 24.5% under the age of 18, 5.4% from 18 to 24, 25.1% from 25 to 44, 29.0% from 45 to 64, and 16.1% 65 or older. The median age was 42 years. For every 100 females, there were 106.8 males. For every 100 females age 18 and over, there were 99.2 males.

The median household income was $32,292 and the median family income was $34,167. Males had a median income of $28,571 versus $18,125 for females. The per capita income for the unorganized territory was $14,180. About 1.9% of families and 3.6% of the population were below the poverty line, including none of those under age 18 and 10.3% of those age 65 or over.
