= Hazelton Township, Aitkin County, Minnesota =

Township in Minnesota, United States

Hazelton Township
- Township
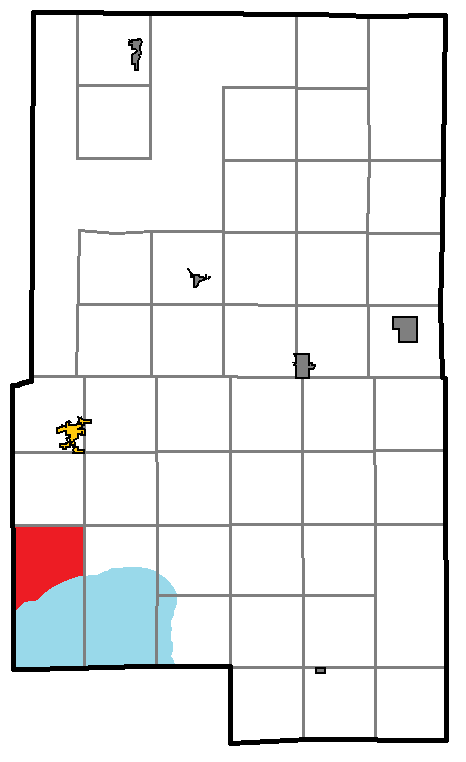
- Location of Hazelton Township, within Aitkin County, Minnesota

- Location within the state of Minnesota
- Coordinates: 46°22′7″N 93°46′18″W
- Country: United States
- State: Minnesota
- County: Aitkin

Area
  - Total: 70.8 sq mi (183.3 km^{2})
  - Land: 28.1 sq mi (72.9 km^{2})
  - Water: 42.6 sq mi (110.4 km^{2})
- Elevation: 1,263 ft (385 m)

Population (2020)
  - Total: 792
  - Density: 28.1/sq mi (10.9/km^{2})
- Time zone: UTC-6 (Central (CST))
  - Summer (DST): UTC-5 (CDT)
- FIPS code: 27-28052
- GNIS feature ID: 0664432

Hazelton Township is a township in Aitkin County, Minnesota, United States. The population was 792 as of the 2020 census.

== History ==
Hazelton Township was named for early county commissioner Cutler J. Hazelton.

== Geography ==
According to the United States Census Bureau, the township has a total area of 70.8 square miles (183.3 km^{2}), of which 28.1 square miles (72.9 km^{2}) is land and 42.6 square miles (110.4 km^{2}), or 60.24%, is water. Most of the township's extensive water area is within Mille Lacs Lake, the second-largest inland lake in Minnesota.

=== Major highways ===
- U.S. Highway 169
- Minnesota State Highway 18

=== Lakes ===
- Big Pine Lake
- Birch Lake
- Bobseen Lake
- Camp Lake
- Constance Lake
- Cranberry Lake
- Farm Island Lake (south quarter)
- Gregg Lake
- Horseshoe Lake
- Jacobs Lake
- Johnson Lake
- Kelly Lake
- Laurel Lake
- Little Spruce Lake
- Mallard Lake
- Mille Lacs Lake (west half)
- Petes Lakes
- Round Lake
- Sanders Lake
- Spectacle Lake
- Spruce Lake
- Tame Fish Lake
- Taylor Lake
- Thirteen Lake

=== Adjacent townships ===
- Farm Island Township (north)
- Nordland Township (northeast)
- Wealthwood Township (east)
- South Harbor Township, Mille Lacs County (southeast)
- Kathio Township, Mille Lacs County (south)
- Bay Lake Township, Crow Wing County (west)
- Garrison Township, Crow Wing County (west)
- Deerwood Township, Crow Wing County (northwest)

=== Cemeteries ===
The township contains Bennettville Cemetery.

== Demographics ==
As of the census of 2000, there were 712 people, 345 households, and 233 families residing in the township. The population density was 25.3 inhabitants per square mile (9.8/km^{2}). There were 850 housing units at an average density of 30.2 per square mile (11.7/km^{2}). The racial makeup of the township was 96.21% White, 0.56% African American, 2.53% Native American, 0.14% from other races, and 0.56% from two or more races. Hispanic or Latino of any race were 0.14% of the population.

There were 345 households, out of which 15.9% had children under the age of 18 living with them, 59.1% were married couples living together, 6.7% had a female householder with no husband present, and 32.2% were non-families. 28.7% of all households were made up of individuals, and 15.9% had someone living alone who was 65 years of age or older. The average household size was 2.06 and the average family size was 2.44.

In the township the population was spread out, with 13.9% under the age of 18, 4.4% from 18 to 24, 18.0% from 25 to 44, 34.7% from 45 to 64, and 29.1% who were 65 years of age or older. The median age was 54 years. For every 100 females, there were 116.4 males. For every 100 females age 18 and over, there were 111.4 males.

The median income for a household in the township was $33,056, and the median income for a family was $35,577. Males had a median income of $35,263 versus $28,750 for females. The per capita income for the township was $20,731. About 6.3% of families and 10.4% of the population were below the poverty line, including 19.8% of those under age 18 and 4.0% of those age 65 or over.
