= Malmo, Minnesota =

Unincorporated community in Minnesota, US

Malmo
- Unincorporated community
- Location within Minnesota Location within the United States
- Coordinates: 46°20′02″N 93°31′10″W
- Country: United States
- State: Minnesota
- County: Aitkin
- Township: Malmo Township and Lakeside Township
- Elevation: 1,260 ft (380 m)
- Time zone: UTC-6 (Central (CST))
  - Summer (DST): UTC-5 (CDT)
- ZIP code: 56431 and 56342
- Area code: 320
- GNIS feature ID: 647416

Malmo (/ˈmælmoʊ/ MAL-moh) is an unincorporated community and business district in Aitkin County, Minnesota, United States. The community is located on the northeast corner of Mille Lacs Lake at the junction of State Highway 18, State Highway 47, and Aitkin County Road 2.

Malmo is located within Malmo Township and Lakeside Township. Nearby places include Isle, Glen, Garrison, and Aitkin. The community is located 21 miles southeast of the city of Aitkin. Malmo is named after the Swedish city of Malmö.
