= Deerwood Township, Crow Wing County, Minnesota =

Township in Minnesota, United States

Deerwood Township
- Township
- Deerwood Township Hall

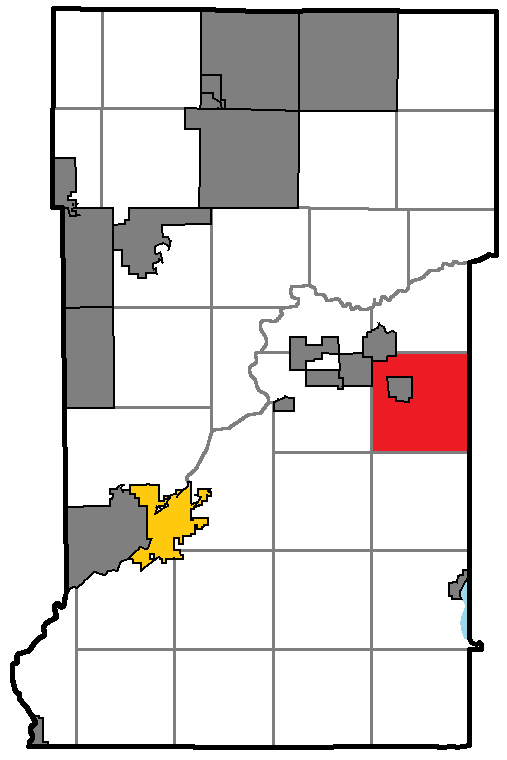
- Location of Deerwood Township within Crow Wing County, Minnesota
- Coordinates: 46°28′4″N 93°52′1″W
- Country: United States
- State: Minnesota
- County: Crow Wing

Area
  - Total: 33.5 sq mi (86.8 km^{2})
  - Land: 28.4 sq mi (73.5 km^{2})
  - Water: 5.1 sq mi (13.2 km^{2})
- Elevation: 1,250 ft (381 m)

Population (2020)
  - Total: 1,309
  - Density: 46.1/sq mi (17.8/km^{2})
- Time zone: UTC-6 (Central (CST))
  - Summer (DST): UTC-5 (CDT)
- ZIP code: 56444
- Area code: 218
- FIPS code: 27-15364
- GNIS feature ID: 0663951
- Website: Township website

Deerwood Township is a township in Crow Wing County, Minnesota, United States. The population was 1,309 at the 2020 census.

== Geography ==
According to the United States Census Bureau, the township has a total area of 33.5 square miles (87 km^{2}), of which 28.4 square miles (74 km^{2}) is land and 5.1 square miles (13 km^{2}) (15.22%) is water.

The city of Deerwood is geographically within Deerwood Township but is a separate entity.

== Demographics ==
As of the census of 2000, there were 1,244 people, 479 households, and 390 families residing in the township. The population density was 43.8 inhabitants per square mile (16.9/km^{2}). There were 728 housing units at an average density of 25.6 per square mile (9.9/km^{2}). The racial makeup of the township was 98.47% White, 0.32% African American, 0.40% Native American, 0.24% Asian, and 0.56% from two or more races. Hispanic or Latino of any race were 0.88% of the population.

There were 479 households, out of which 29.0% had children under the age of 18 living with them, 76.6% were married couples living together, 2.9% had a female householder with no husband present, and 18.4% were non-families. 14.2% of all households were made up of individuals, and 7.9% had someone living alone who was 65 years of age or older. The average household size was 2.60 and the average family size was 2.87.

In the township the population was spread out, with 23.3% under the age of 18, 6.0% from 18 to 24, 22.6% from 25 to 44, 30.3% from 45 to 64, and 17.8% who were 65 years of age or older. The median age was 44 years. For every 100 females, there were 101.0 males. For every 100 females age 18 and over, there were 101.3 males.

The median income for a household in the township was $46,429, and the median income for a family was $51,625. Males had a median income of $34,239 versus $26,389 for females. The per capita income for the township was $21,403. About 3.9% of families and 7.3% of the population were below the poverty line, including 12.2% of those under age 18 and 11.7% of those age 65 or over.
