= Willow River (Mississippi River tributary) =

Coordinates: 46.6727°N 93.5925°W

The Willow River is a tributary of the Mississippi River, approximately 76 mi (122 km) long, in northern Minnesota in the United States.

It rises in It is formed by the confluence of the North Fork Willow River and South Fork Willow River in East Cass.

Willow River was so named from the growth of willows in what were swampy areas.

== See also ==
- List of Minnesota rivers
