= Tamarack, Minnesota =

City in Minnesota, United States

- City
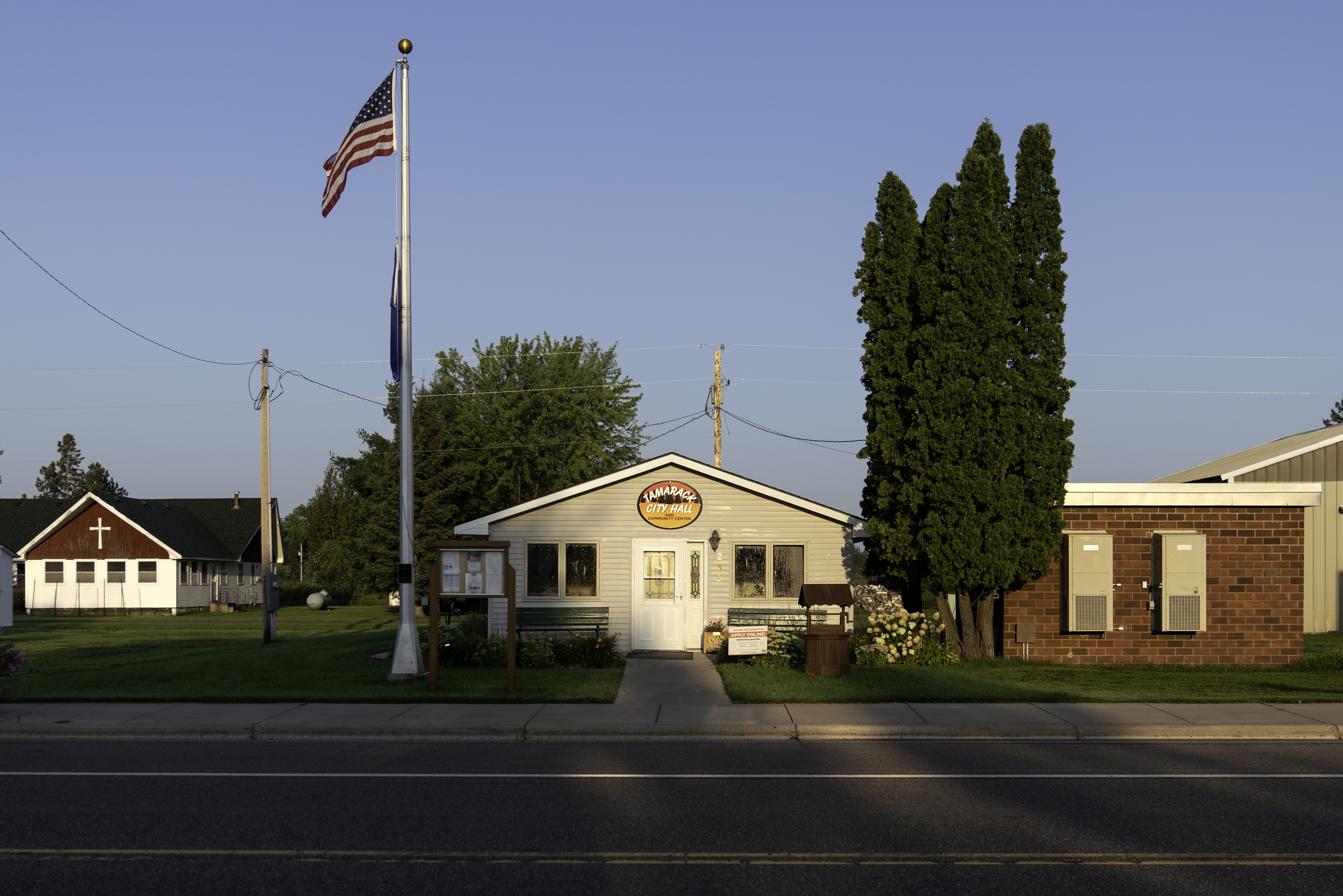
- Tamarack City Hall

- Location of the city of Tamarack within Aitkin County, Minnesota
- Coordinates: 46°39′12″N 93°08′00″W
- Country: United States
- State: Minnesota
- County: Aitkin
- Settled: c.1874
- Incorporated: July 26, 1921

Area
  - Total: 3.50 sq mi (9.07 km^{2})
  - Land: 3.50 sq mi (9.07 km^{2})
  - Water: 0 sq mi (0.00 km^{2})
- Elevation: 1,266 ft (386 m)

Population (2020)
  - Total: 62
  - Density: 17.7/sq mi (6.84/km^{2})
- Time zone: UTC-6 (Central (CST))
  - Summer (DST): UTC-5 (CDT)
- ZIP code: 55787
- Area code: 218
- FIPS code: 27-64156
- GNIS feature ID: 2396028

Tamarack is a city in Aitkin County, Minnesota, United States. The population was 57 at the 2020 census. Tamarack is located along Minnesota State Highway 210 at the junction with Aitkin County Roads 6 and 16. Other routes include Main Street.

== History ==
Tamarack was first settled circa 1874 as Sicottes. The post office began in 1898. Tamarack was incorporated in 1921. The community was established when the Northern Pacific Railway laid track from Duluth to Brainerd.

== Geography ==
According to the United States Census Bureau, the city has a total area of 3.58 square miles (9.27 km^{2}), all land.

== Demographics ==
Historical population
Census	Pop.	Note	%±
1930	145		—
1940	150		3.4%
1950	132		−12.0%
1960	112		−15.2%
1970	100		−10.7%
1980	83		−17.0%
1990	53		−36.1%
2000	59		11.3%
2010	94		59.3%
2020	62		−34.0%
U.S. Decennial Census

=== 2010 census ===
As of the census of 2010, there were 94 people, 40 households, and 23 families living in the city. The population density was 26.3 inhabitants per square mile (10.2/km^{2}). There were 49 housing units at an average density of 13.7 per square mile (5.3/km^{2}). The racial makeup of the city was 97.9% White, 1.1% Native American, and 1.1% from two or more races.

There were 40 households, of which 27.5% had children under the age of 18 living with them, 45.0% were married couples living together, 2.5% had a female householder with no husband present, 10.0% had a male householder with no wife present, and 42.5% were non-families. 37.5% of all households were made up of individuals, and 15% had someone living alone who was 65 years of age or older. The average household size was 2.35 and the average family size was 2.83.

The median age in the city was 36.4 years. 27.7% of residents were under the age of 18; 4.3% were between the ages of 18 and 24; 28.7% were from 25 to 44; 23.4% were from 45 to 64; and 16% were 65 years of age or older. The gender makeup of the city was 53.2% male and 46.8% female.

=== 2000 census ===
As of the census of 2000, there were 59 people, 30 households, and 18 families living in the city. The population density was 16.4 people per square mile (6.3 people/km^{2}). There were 48 housing units at an average density of 13.3 per square mile (5.1/km^{2}). The racial makeup of the city was 93.22% White, 1.69% African American, and 5.08% from two or more races. 29.8% were of Norwegian, 21.1% Finnish, 19.3% Irish, 8.8% Polish, 8.8% Swedish, 7.0% German and 5.3% Scottish ancestry according to Census 2000.

There were 30 households, out of which 23.3% had children under the age of 18 living with them, 43.3% were married couples living together, 13.3% had a female householder with no husband present, and 40.0% were non-families. 40.0% of all households were made up of individuals, and 16.7% had someone living alone who was 65 years of age or older. The average household size was 1.97 and the average family size was 2.56.

In the city, the population was spread out, with 20.3% under the age of 18, 3.4% from 18 to 24, 22.0% from 25 to 44, 33.9% from 45 to 64, and 20.3% who were 65 years of age or older. The median age was 49 years. For every 100 females, there were 110.7 males. For every 100 females age 18 and over, there were 113.6 males.

The median income for a household in the city was $20,625, and the median income for a family was $21,875. Males had a median income of $22,083 versus $7,083 for females. The per capita income for the city was $35,197. There were 8.7% of families and 10.6% of the population living below the poverty line, including no under eighteens and 13.6% of those over 64.

== Economy ==
In 2020, highly valuable nickel, copper and cobalt occurrences were discovered near Tamarack. Environmental groups have expressed concerns over the potential pollution of the Kettle River headwaters, and the Mississippi watershed. The Environmental Protection Agency considers hardrock mining the top polluting industry in the US, and there is a long history of toxic emission problems at such operations around the world. Exploratory drilling occurred near Tamarack occurred in 2022.
