= Minnesota State Highway 18 =

State highway in Minnesota, United States

Trunk Highway 18
- MN 18 highlighted in red

Route information
- Maintained by MnDOT
- Length: 78.207 mi (125.862 km)
- Existed: November 2, 1920–present
- Tourist routes: Lake Mille Lacs Scenic Byway

Major junctions
- West end: MN 25 in Brainerd
- MN 6 at Bay Lake Township; US 169 at Garrison; MN 47 at Malmo; MN 27 / MN 65 near McGrath
- East end: MN 23 in Finlayson Township

Location
- Country: United States
- State: Minnesota
- Counties: Crow Wing, Aitkin, Mille Lacs, Pine

Highway system
- Minnesota Trunk Highway System; Interstate; US; State; Legislative; Scenic
← MN 16	→ MN 19

Minnesota State Highway 18 (MN 18) is a 78.207-mile-long (125.862 km) highway in east-central Minnesota, which runs from its intersection with State Highway 25 in Brainerd and continues east to its eastern terminus at its intersection with State Highway 23 in Finlayson Township near Askov and Sandstone. The eastern terminus of Highway 18 is less than 1/2 mile west of an interchange with Interstate Highway 35 along Highway 23.

For part of its route (5 miles), Highway 18 runs concurrent with U.S. Highway 169 in Crow Wing and Aitkin counties around the northwest side of Mille Lacs Lake.

Highway 18 also runs together with State Highway 47 for 9 miles (14 km) in Aitkin and Mille Lacs counties around the northeast side of Mille Lacs Lake.

== Route description ==
State Highway 18 serves as an east–west route between Brainerd, Garrison, Mille Lacs Lake, and Finlayson in east-central Minnesota. The route passes around the north end of Mille Lacs Lake, which is a popular fishing and recreational destination in Minnesota.

The section of Highway 18 from Brainerd to Garrison is officially designated the POW / MIA Memorial Highway. A section of U.S. Highway 169 in Minnesota also takes on this same memorial name designation.

Highway 18 passes through the Wealthwood State Forest in Aitkin County.

Banning State Park is located east of the junction of Highways 18 and 23; opposite the I-35 freeway near Askov and Sandstone.

== History ==
The section of State Highway 18 between Brainerd and U.S. 169 at Garrison was authorized on November 2, 1920. The remainder of the route was authorized in 1933 and 1963.

From 1933 until the mid-1950s, the eastern terminus of Highway 18 was at the present day junction of State Highway 27 and State Highway 47 (then State Highway 56) at Isle.

Before 1963, the present day section of Highway 18 between State Highway 47 and State Highway 65 was originally numbered as State Highway 27; and the present day section of Highway 18 between State Highway 65 and State Highway 23 (near Sandstone) was originally numbered as State Highway 66 (essentially east of Mille Lacs Lake).

By 1940, the only paved section of Highway 18 was between Brainerd and Garrison. The last unpaved section of Highway 18 was east of State Highway 47 to State Highway 65, paved in the late 1960s.

At one time, Highway 18 had continued farther west of State Highway 25 in Brainerd. This section was turned back to the city of Brainerd maintenance in 2001 after completion of the nearby Highway 371 Brainerd bypass.

== Major intersections ==
County	Location	mi	km	Destinations	Notes
Crow Wing	Brainerd	0.000	0.000	MN 210	Programmed mile 0; former western terminus
Crow Wing	Brainerd	0.435	0.700	MN 322	
Crow Wing	Brainerd	2.327	3.745	MN 25	Western terminus
Crow Wing	Brainerd	2.565	4.128	State Avenue-Minnesota Department of Human Servies	Former MN 309
Crow Wing	Bay Lake Township	16.111	25.928	MN 6 north – Deerwood	Southern terminus of MN 6
Crow Wing	Garrison	20.445	32.903	US 169 south (Lake Mille Lacs Scenic Byway) – Onamia	Western end of US 169 concurrency
Aitkin	Hazelton Township	25.709	41.375	US 169 north – Aitkin	Eastern end of US 169 concurrency
Aitkin	Malmo	38.348	61.715	MN 47 north / CSAH 2 east – Aitkin	Western end of MN 47 concurrency
Mille Lacs	East Side Township	47.413	76.304	MN 47 south (Lake Mille Lacs Scenic Byway) – Isle	Eastern end of MN 47 concurrency
Aitkin	Williams Township	55.756	89.731	MN 27 / MN 65 – Mora, McGregor	
Pine	Finlayson Township	78.951	127.059	CSAH 61 north / Old US 61 – Rutledge	Western end of CSAH 61 concurrency
Pine	Finlayson Township	80.516	129.578	MN 23 / CSAH 61 south / Old US 61 to I-35 – Askov, Sandstone	Eastern terminus; eastern end of CSAH 61 concurrency
1.000 mi = 1.609 km; 1.000 km = 0.621 mi: Closed/former; Concurrency terminus
