= Aitkin County, Minnesota =

County in Minnesota, United States

- County
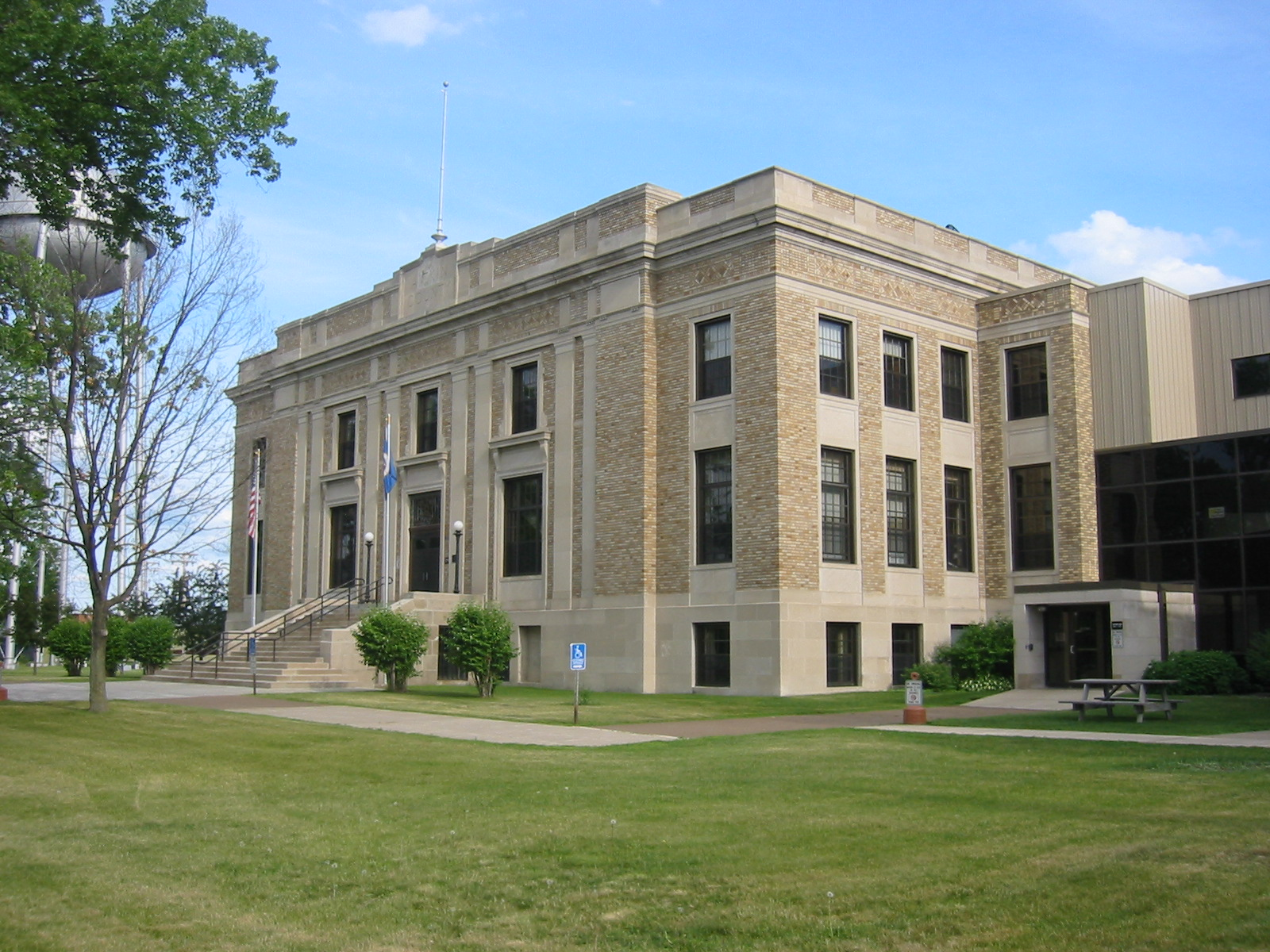
- Aitkin County Courthouse

- Location within the U.S. state of Minnesota
- Coordinates: 46°37′N 93°25′W
- Country: United States
- State: Minnesota
- Created: May 23, 1857
- Organized: June 30, 1871
- Named for: William Alexander Aitken
- Seat: Aitkin
- Largest city: Aitkin

Area
  - Total: 1,995 sq mi (5,170 km^{2})
  - Land: 1,822 sq mi (4,720 km^{2})
  - Water: 174 sq mi (450 km^{2}) 8.7%

Population (2020)
  - Total: 15,697
  - Estimate (2025): 16,252 ▲
  - Density: 8.69/sq mi (3.36/km^{2})
- Time zone: UTC−6 (Central)
  - Summer (DST): UTC−5 (CDT)
- Congressional district: 8th
- Website: www.co.aitkin.mn.us

Aitkin County (/ˈeɪkɪn/ AY-kin) is a county in the U.S. state of Minnesota. As of the 2020 census, the population was 15,697. Its county seat is Aitkin. Part of the Mille Lacs Indian Reservation is in the county. The county was created in 1857 and organized in 1871.

== History ==
Aitkin County was established in 1857 as Aiken County. The current spelling was adopted in 1872. It was named for William Alexander Aitken, a fur trader for the American Fur Company, under John Jacob Astor. Formed from Ramsey and Pine counties, Aiken County originally consisted of the 17 townships closest to Mille Lacs Lake. It acquired outlands of Ramsey, Itasca and Pine Counties to its north and east. It was organized in 1871, taking up lands from Cass and Itasca Counties and losing a point in the southwestern corner to Crow Wing County to form its current boundaries.

In the 1970s and '80s, Aitkin County became home of three short-lived lesbian feminist farmsteads: Rising Moon Farm (1973 - 1980s), Mel’s Place (1974-5), and Del Lago Farm (1975-6), inspired by the commune, housing cooperative, and back-to-the-land movements. Rising Moon, built in 1972 by lesbian activists Jane Stedman, Linda Page, and Trudy Fulton Smith, operated a food co-op, and welcomed other lesbians included writers Dianna Hunter and Kathy McConnell. It operated off-the-grid, and lacked running water and electricity. In 1973, the farm burned down, and was quickly rebuilt by its owners, however some residents moved to Mel’s Place, and then to Del Lago Farm.

== Geography ==
The Mississippi River flows southward through the west central part of the county. The county terrain consists of wooded rolling hills, dotted with lakes and ponds. The terrain slopes to the south; its highest point is Quadna Mountain, 2.5 miles (4.0 km) south-southeast of Hill City, at 1,591 ft (485 m) ASL. Otherwise the highest terrain is near its northwestern corner, at 1,388 ft (423 m) ASL. The county has a total area of 1,995 square miles (5,170 km^{2}), of which 1,822 square miles (4,720 km^{2}) is land and 174 square miles (450 km^{2}) (8.7%) is water.

Soils of Aitkin County

=== Major highways ===
- U.S. Highway 2
- U.S. Highway 169
- Minnesota State Highway 18
- Minnesota State Highway 27
- Minnesota State Highway 47
- Minnesota State Highway 65
- Minnesota State Highway 200
- Minnesota State Highway 210

=== Adjacent counties ===
- Itasca County - north
- Saint Louis County - northeast
- Carlton County - east
- Pine County - southeast
- Kanabec County - south
- Mille Lacs County - southwest
- Crow Wing County - west
- Cass County - northwest

=== Protected areas ===
- Grayling State Wildlife Management Area
- Hill River State Forest
- Kimberly State Wildlife Management Area
- McGregor Marsh Scientific and Natural Area
- Rice Lake National Wildlife Refuge
- Ripple River State Wildlife Management Area
- Salo Marsh State Wildlife Management Area
- Savanna Portage State Park
- Snake River County Park
- Solana State Forest

== Climate and weather ==
Aitkin, Minnesota

Climate chart (precipitation, max. and min. temperature)
J	F	M	A	M	J	J	A	S	O	N	D
1 20 0	0.8 26 4	1.7 38 16	2.6 54 30	3.1 66 40	4.5 75 51	4.2 80 56	3.2 77 53	3.3 68 45	2.9 55 34	1.6 38 21	1 24 7
- █ Average max. and min. temperatures in °F
- █ Precipitation totals in inches
- Source: The Weather Channel
Metric conversion
J	F	M	A	M	J	J	A	S	O	N	D
25 −7 −18	20 −3 −16	43 3 −9	66 12 −1	79 19 4	113 24 11	105 27 13	81 25 12	84 20 7	73 13 1	40 3 −6	26 −4 −14
- █ Average max. and min. temperatures in °C
- █ Precipitation totals in mm

In recent years, average temperatures in the county seat of Aitkin have ranged from a low of 0 °F (−18 °C) in January to a high of 80 °F (27 °C) in July, although a record low of −47 °F (−44 °C) was recorded in January 1972 and a record high of 100 °F (38 °C) was recorded in August 1976. Although these records are the official records, temperatures above 100 °F (38 °C) has been detected numerous times throughout Aitkin County and surrounding areas. Average monthly precipitation ranged from 0.79 inches (20 mm) in February to 4.46 inches (113 mm) in June.

== Demographics ==
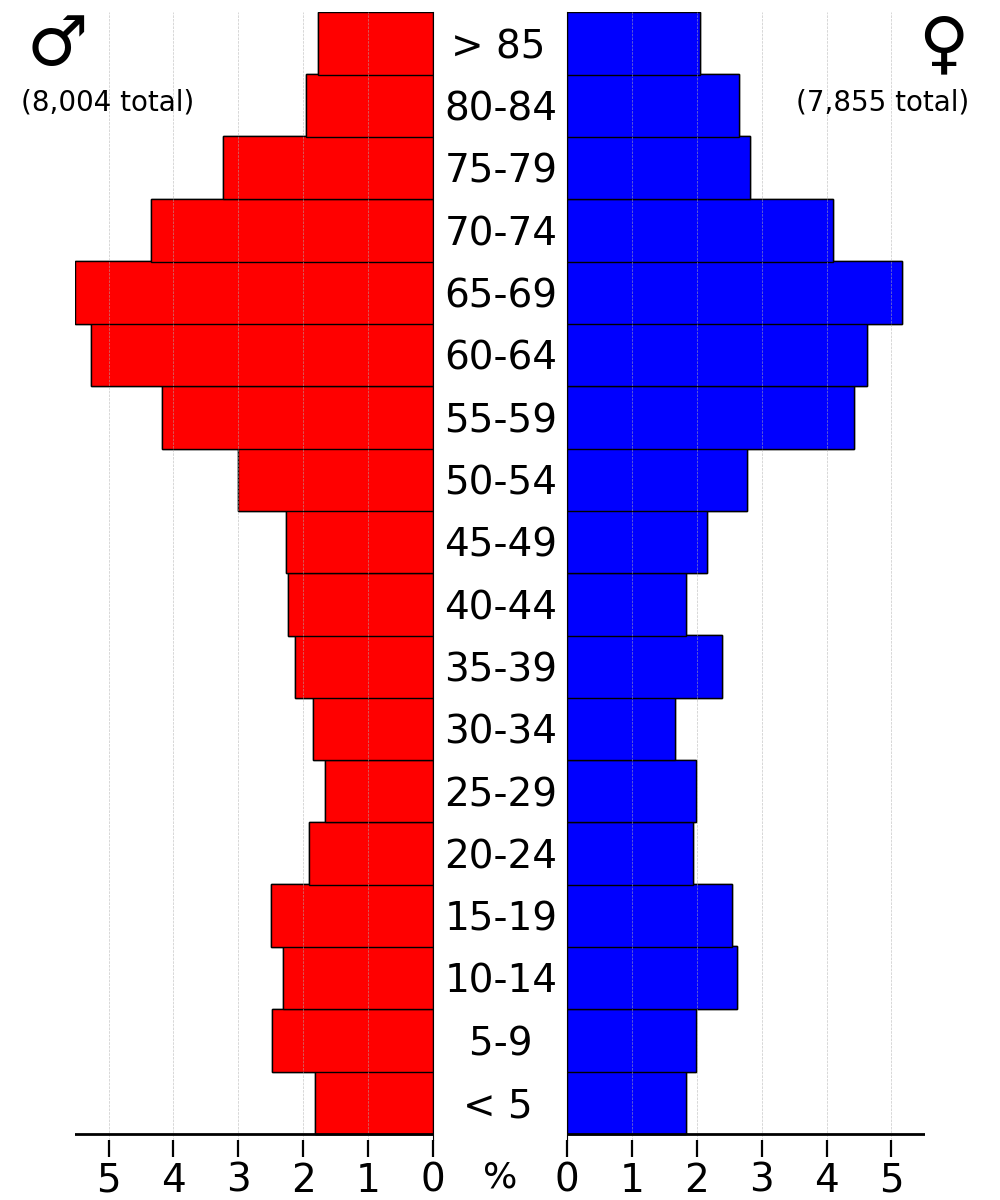
2022 US Census population pyramid for Aitkin County from ACS 5-year estimates

Historical population
Census	Pop.	Note	%±
1860	2		—
1870	178		8,800.0%
1880	366		105.6%
1890	2,462		572.7%
1900	6,473		162.9%
1910	10,371		60.2%
1920	15,043		45.0%
1930	15,009		−0.2%
1940	17,865		19.0%
1950	14,327		−19.8%
1960	12,162		−15.1%
1970	11,403		−6.2%
1980	13,404		17.5%
1990	12,425		−7.3%
2000	15,301		23.1%
2010	16,202		5.9%
2020	15,697		−3.1%
2025 (est.)	16,252	▲	3.5%
U.S. Decennial Census; 1790-1960 1900-1990; 1990-2000 2010-2020

=== Racial and ethnic composition ===
Aitkin County, Minnesota – Racial and ethnic composition Note: the US Census treats Hispanic/Latino as an ethnic category. This table excludes Latinos from the racial categories and assigns them to a separate category. Hispanics/Latinos may be of any race.
Race / Ethnicity (NH = Non-Hispanic)	Pop 1980	Pop 1990	Pop 2000	Pop 2010	Pop 2020	% 1980	% 1990	% 2000	% 2010	% 2020
White alone (NH)	13,195	12,176	14,698	15,398	14,479	98.44%	98.00%	96.06%	95.04%	92.24%
Black or African American alone (NH)	12	13	31	53	58	0.09%	0.10%	0.20%	0.33%	0.37%
Native American or Alaska Native alone (NH)	127	169	340	376	376	0.95%	1.36%	2.22%	2.32%	2.40%
Asian alone (NH)	20	30	27	27	38	0.15%	0.24%	0.18%	0.17%	0.24%
Native Hawaiian or Pacific Islander alone (NH)	x	x	3	4	1	x	x	0.02%	0.02%	0.01%
Other race alone (NH)	4	2	7	5	25	0.03%	0.02%	0.05%	0.03%	0.16%
Mixed race or Multiracial (NH)	x	x	103	188	500	x	x	0.67%	1.16%	3.19%
Hispanic or Latino (any race)	46	35	92	151	220	0.34%	0.28%	0.60%	0.93%	1.40%
Total	13,404	12,425	15,301	16,202	15,697	100.00%	100.00%	100.00%	100.00%	100.00%

=== 2020 census ===
As of the 2020 census, the county had a population of 15,697. The median age was 56.2 years. 17.0% of residents were under the age of 18 and 32.9% of residents were 65 years of age or older. For every 100 females there were 102.6 males, and for every 100 females age 18 and over there were 101.8 males age 18 and over.

The racial makeup of the county was 92.6% White, 0.4% Black or African American, 2.5% American Indian and Alaska Native, 0.2% Asian, <0.1% Native Hawaiian and Pacific Islander, 0.4% from some other race, and 3.8% from two or more races. Hispanic or Latino residents of any race comprised 1.4% of the population.

<0.1% of residents lived in urban areas, while 100.0% lived in rural areas.

There were 7,199 households in the county, of which 18.2% had children under the age of 18 living in them. Of all households, 49.0% were married-couple households, 21.6% were households with a male householder and no spouse or partner present, and 21.8% were households with a female householder and no spouse or partner present. About 33.2% of all households were made up of individuals and 18.2% had someone living alone who was 65 years of age or older.

There were 13,944 housing units, of which 48.4% were vacant. Among occupied housing units, 82.0% were owner-occupied and 18.0% were renter-occupied. The homeowner vacancy rate was 1.6% and the rental vacancy rate was 7.9%.

=== 2010 census ===
As of the census of 2010, there were 16,202 people, 7,542 households, and 4,458 families in the county. The population density was 8.89 per square mile (3.43/km^{2}). There were 16,626 housing units at an average density of 9.13 per square mile (3.53/km^{2}). The racial makeup of the county was 95.63% or 15,494 people White, 0.35% or 57 people Black or African American, 2.4% or 390 people Native American, 0.17% or 27 people Asian, 0.025% or 4 people Pacific Islander, 0.13% or 21 people from other races, and 1.29% or 209 people from two or more races. Of the population with two or more races, 0.9% of the population were Hispanic or Latino of any race. 29.5% were of German, 14.3% Norwegian, 13.0% Swedish, 6.2% Irish, 5.3% United States or American and 5.2% Finnish ancestry.

There were 6,644 households, out of which 22.60% had children under the age of 18 living with them, 57.50% were married couples living together, 6.30% had a female householder with no husband present, and 32.90% were non-families. 28.70% of all households were made up of individuals, and 14.00% had someone living alone who was 65 years of age or older. The average household size was 2.28 and the average family size was 2.76.

The county population contained 20.90% under the age of 18, 5.50% from 18 to 24, 21.60% from 25 to 44, 29.10% from 45 to 64, and 23.00% who were 65 years of age or older. The median age was 46 years. For every 100 females there were 101.60 males. For every 100 females age 18 and over, there were 99.90 males.

The median income for a household in the county was $44,139, and the median income for a family was $58,290. Males had a median income of $51,604 versus $30,633 for females. The per capita income for the county was $21,848. About 5.20% of families and 7.60% of the population were below the poverty line, including 15.50% of those under age 18 and 11.00% of those age 65 or over.

== Communities ==
=== Cities ===
- Aitkin
- Hill City
- McGrath
- McGregor
- Palisade
- Tamarack

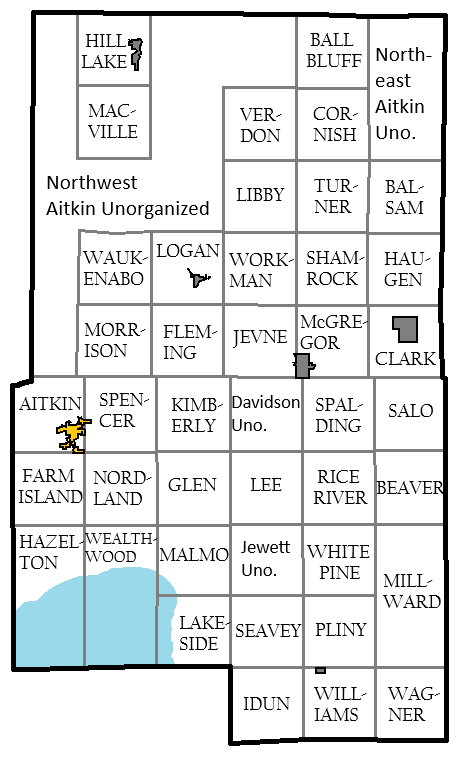
Townships and unorganized territories of Aitkin County

=== Townships ===
- Aitkin Township
- Ball Bluff Township
- Balsam Township
- Beaver Township
- Clark Township
- Cornish Township
- Farm Island Township
- Fleming Township
- Glen Township
- Haugen Township
- Hazelton Township
- Hill Lake Township
- Idun Township
- Jevne Township
- Kimberly Township
- Lakeside Township
- Lee Township
- Libby Township
- Logan Township
- Macville Township
- Malmo Township
- McGregor Township
- Millward Township
- Morrison Township
- Nordland Township
- Pliny Township
- Rice River Township
- Salo Township
- Seavey Township
- Shamrock Township
- Spalding Township
- Spencer Township
- Turner Township
- Verdon Township
- Wagner Township
- Waukenabo Township
- Wealthwood Township
- White Pine Township
- Williams Township
- Workman Township

=== Unorganized territories ===
- Davidson
- Jewett
- Northeast Aitkin
- Northwest Aitkin

=== Unincorporated communities ===
- Arthyde
- Ball Bluff
- Bennettville
- Cutler
- Dads Corner
- East Lake (Minisinaakwaang)
- Giese
- Glen
- Glory
- Hassman
- Haypoint
- Jacobson
- Kimberly
- Lawler
- Libby
- Malmo
- Minnewawa
- Nichols
- Rabey
- Red Top
- Ronald
- Rossburg
- Sandy Lake (Gaa-mitaawangaagamaag)
- Sheshebee
- Shovel Lake
- Swatara
- Thor
- Waukenabo
- Wealthwood

== Government and politics ==
Aitkin County voters have selected the Democratic Party candidate in 62.5% of national elections since 1960, as of 2020. Recent presidential elections have shifted to the Republican Party, with their candidate winning five of the last six elections as of 2024 and their lone loss in that span coming by just 6 votes.

United States presidential election results for Aitkin County, Minnesota
Year	Republican		Democratic		Third party(ies)	
Year	No.	%	No.	%	No.	%
1892	445	62.59%	217	30.52%	49	6.89%
1896	855	69.46%	344	27.94%	32	2.60%
1900	988	77.31%	262	20.50%	28	2.19%
1904	1,327	80.96%	191	11.65%	121	7.38%
1908	1,205	67.02%	389	21.64%	204	11.35%
1912	362	17.38%	413	19.83%	1,308	62.79%
1916	1,122	46.23%	877	36.14%	428	17.63%
1920	2,933	70.15%	613	14.66%	635	15.19%
1924	2,720	53.67%	212	4.18%	2,136	42.15%
1928	3,951	70.10%	1,428	25.34%	257	4.56%
1932	2,341	40.76%	2,945	51.28%	457	7.96%
1936	2,466	37.30%	3,806	57.57%	339	5.13%
1940	3,744	50.12%	3,610	48.33%	116	1.55%
1944	2,720	49.37%	2,743	49.79%	46	0.83%
1948	2,466	41.05%	3,277	54.55%	264	4.39%
1952	3,384	55.93%	2,577	42.60%	89	1.47%
1956	2,762	50.18%	2,733	49.65%	9	0.16%
1960	3,097	50.66%	2,980	48.75%	36	0.59%
1964	2,000	33.96%	3,874	65.77%	16	0.27%
1968	2,254	39.84%	3,094	54.69%	309	5.46%
1972	3,241	53.73%	2,687	44.55%	104	1.72%
1976	2,476	35.63%	4,308	61.99%	165	2.37%
1980	3,396	44.28%	3,677	47.94%	597	7.78%
1984	3,422	46.14%	3,943	53.17%	51	0.69%
1988	3,011	43.37%	3,863	55.65%	68	0.98%
1992	2,151	28.46%	3,400	44.98%	2,008	26.56%
1996	2,327	31.43%	3,810	51.46%	1,267	17.11%
2000	3,755	45.46%	3,830	46.37%	675	8.17%
2004	4,768	50.44%	4,539	48.02%	145	1.53%
2008	4,589	48.77%	4,595	48.83%	226	2.40%
2012	4,533	49.58%	4,412	48.26%	197	2.15%
2016	5,516	59.76%	3,134	33.95%	581	6.29%
2020	6,258	62.42%	3,607	35.98%	160	1.60%
2024	6,741	64.53%	3,524	33.74%	181	1.73%

County Board of Commissioners
Position	Name	District
Commissioner and Chairperson	J. Mark Wedel	District 1
Commissioner	Laurie Westerlund	District 2
Commissioner and Vice Chair	Travis Leiviska	District 3
Commissioner	Bret Sample	District 4
Commissioner	Michael Kearney	District 5

State Legislature (2018–2020)
Position	Name	Affiliation	District
Senate	Carrie Ruud	Republican	District 10
House of Representatives	Dale Lueck	Republican	District 10B

U.S. Congress (2018–2020)
Position	Name	Affiliation	District
House of Representatives	Pete Stauber	Republican	8th
Senate	Amy Klobuchar	Democrat	N/A
Senate	Tina Smith	Democrat	N/A

== See also ==
- National Register of Historic Places listings in Aitkin County, Minnesota
