= Palisade, Minnesota =

City in Minnesota, United States

- City
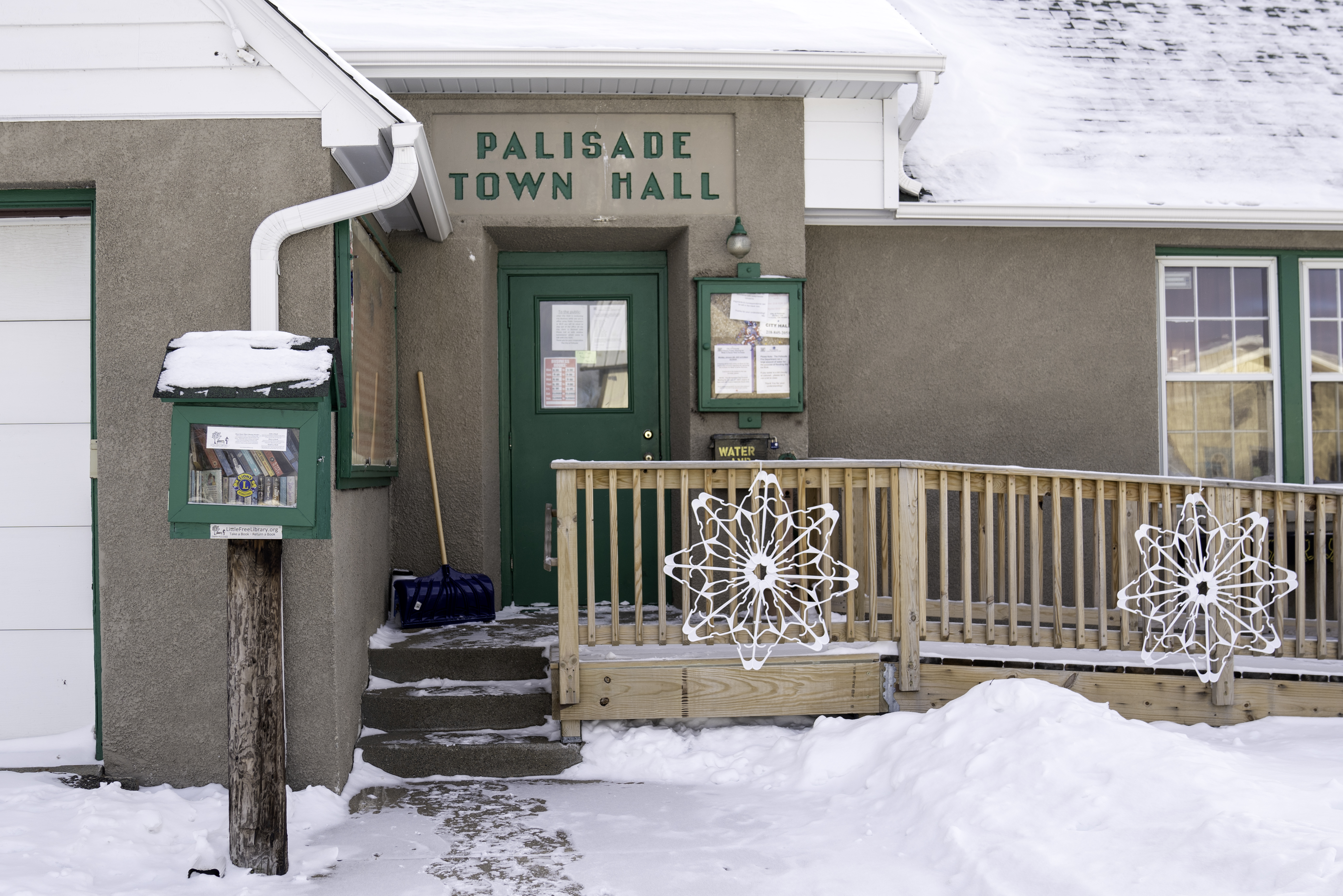
- Palisade Town Hall

- Location of the city of Palisade within Aitkin County, Minnesota
- Coordinates: 46°42′50″N 93°29′52″W
- Country: United States
- State: Minnesota
- County: Aitkin
- Incorporated: July 7, 1922

Government
  - Mayor: Pamela Nordstrom

Area
  - Total: 0.685 sq mi (1.774 km^{2})
  - Land: 0.685 sq mi (1.773 km^{2})
  - Water: 0.0012 sq mi (0.003 km^{2})
- Elevation: 1,250 ft (380 m)

Population (2020)
  - Total: 162
  - Estimate (2022): 166
  - Density: 236.7/sq mi (91.38/km^{2})
- Time zone: UTC−6 (Central (CST))
  - Summer (DST): UTC−5 (CDT)
- ZIP Code: 56469
- Area code: 218
- FIPS code: 27-49498
- GNIS feature ID: 2396128
- Sales tax: 6.875%

Palisade is a city in Aitkin County, Minnesota, United States. The population was 162 at the 2020 census. The Mississippi River flows through the area.

== History ==
Palisade was incorporated in 1922. The post office began in 1910. Palisade was named by an official of the Soo Line Railroad for the high embankment on either side of the Mississippi River.

== Geography ==
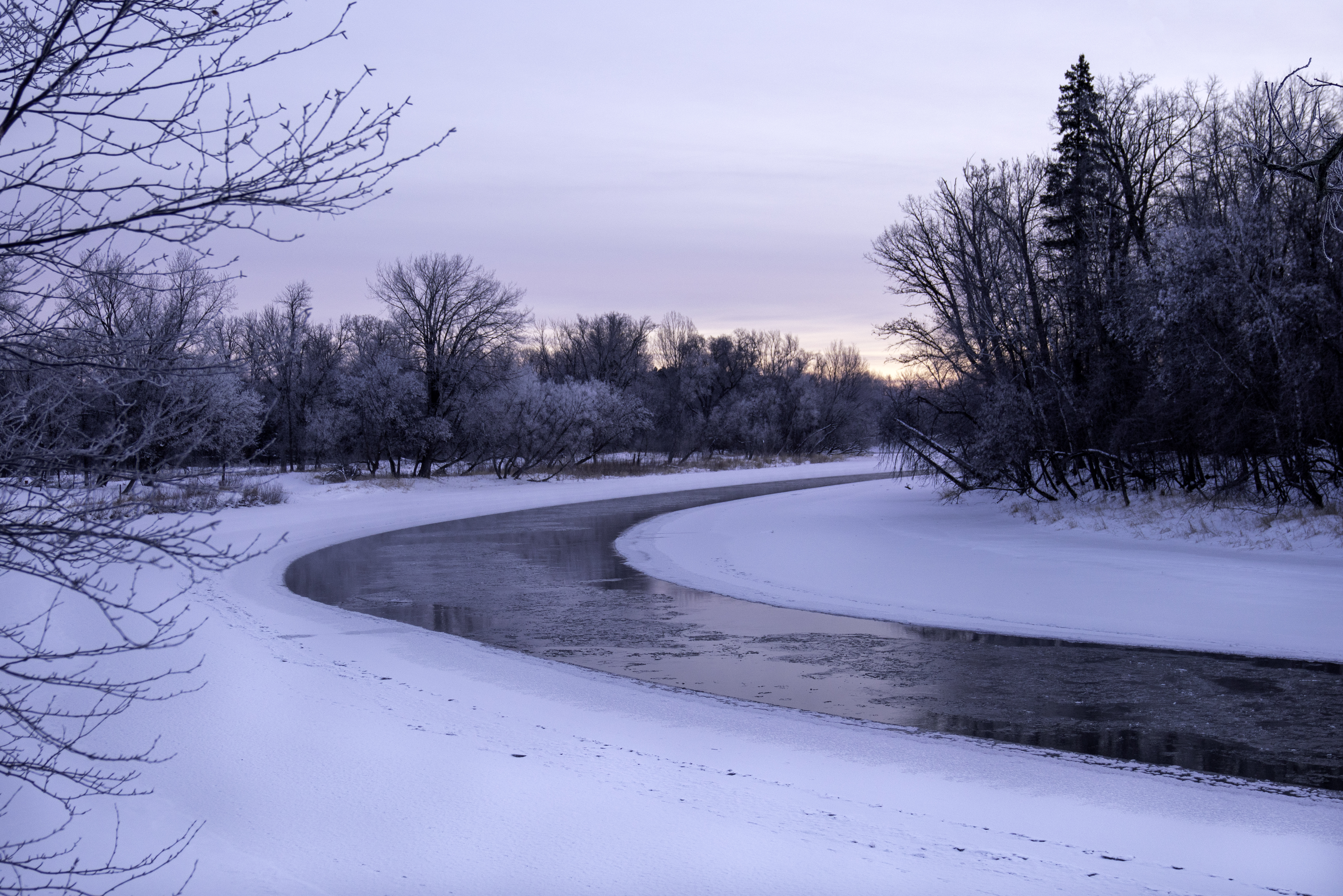
Mississippi River at sunset in Palisade

According to the United States Census Bureau, the city has a total area of 0.684 square miles (1.77 km^{2}), all land.

Palisade is located northeast of the city of Aitkin at the junction of Aitkin County Roads 3, 5, and 10.

Old State Highway 232 (MN 232) from Palisade to the junction of Highway 65 at nearby Shamrock Township has been deeded over to Aitkin County maintenance, and is now designated as an extension of County Road 3.

Aitkin County Road 3 is also known as Main Street in Palisade.

Palisade is 20 miles (32 km) northeast of the city of Aitkin and 42 miles (68 km) south of Grand Rapids.

Nearby routes include U.S. Highway 169 (U.S. 169), State Highway 65 (MN 65), and State Highway 210 (MN 210).

Palisade is located within Logan Township geographically but is a separate entity. The Soo Line North ATV Trail is nearby.

== Demographics ==
Historical population
Census	Pop.	Note	%±
1930	162		—
1940	202		24.7%
1950	212		5.0%
1960	180		−15.1%
1970	149		−17.2%
1980	155		4.0%
1990	144		−7.1%
2000	118		−18.1%
2010	167		41.5%
2020	162		−3.0%
2022 (est.)	166		2.5%
U.S. Decennial Census; 2020 Census

=== 2010 census ===
As of the 2010 census, there were 167 people, 74 households, and 51 families living in the city. The population density was 256.9 inhabitants per square mile (99.2/km^{2}). There were 85 housing units at an average density of 130.8 per square mile (50.5/km^{2}). The racial makeup of the city was 92.2% White, 0.6% African American, 6.6% Native American, and 0.6% from other races. Hispanic or Latino of any race were 0.6% of the population.

There were 74 households, of which 21.6% had children under the age of 18 living with them, 51.4% were married couples living together, 12.2% had a female householder with no husband present, 5.4% had a male householder with no wife present, and 31.1% were non-families. 27.0% of all households were made up of individuals, and 10.8% had someone living alone who was 65 years of age or older. The average household size was 2.26 and the average family size was 2.65.

The median age in the city was 50.2 years. 19.8% of residents were under the age of 18; 3% were between the ages of 18 and 24; 22.2% were from 25 to 44; 36% were from 45 to 64; and 19.2% were 65 years of age or older. The gender makeup of the city was 53.9% male and 46.1% female.

=== 2000 census ===
As of the 2000 census, there were 118 people, 53 households, and 38 families living in the city. The population density was 259.9 inhabitants per square mile (100.3/km^{2}). There were 67 housing units at an average density of 147.6 per square mile (57.0/km^{2}). The racial makeup of the city was 98.31% White, 0.85% Native American, and 0.85% from two or more races. 23.5% were of German, 23.5% Norwegian, 11.8% French, 8.8% Pennsylvania German and 5.9% Scottish ancestry.

There were 53 households, out of which 24.5% had children under the age of 18 living with them, 47.2% were married couples living together, 17.0% had a female householder with no husband present, and 28.3% were non-families. 26.4% of all households were made up of individuals, and 18.9% had someone living alone who was 65 years of age or older. The average household size was 2.23 and the average family size was 2.58.

In the city, the population was spread out, with 16.9% under the age of 18, 12.7% from 18 to 24, 22.0% from 25 to 44, 24.6% from 45 to 64, and 23.7% who were 65 years of age or older. The median age was 44 years. For every 100 females, there were 96.7 males. For every 100 females age 18 and over, there were 104.2 males.

The median income for a household in the city was $27,083, and the median income for a family was $29,375. Males had a median income of $40,625 versus $15,417 for females. The per capita income for the city was $11,702. There were no families and 12.5% of the population living below the poverty line, including no under eighteens and 29.4% of those over 64.

== Culture ==
Palisade is the birthplace of writer Jonathan Franzen's father. The main characters in Franzen's novel "Freedom" are named the Berglunds, likely after the Berglund Park Campground in Palisade.
