= Minnesota State Highway 232 =

State highway in Minnesota, United States

Trunk Highway 232
- MN 232 highlighted in red

Route information
- Maintained by MnDOT
- Length: 9.540 mi (15.353 km)
- Existed: July 1, 1949–April 15, 2012

Major junctions
- West end: CR 3 at Palisade
- East end: MN 65 at Shamrock Township

Location
- Country: United States
- State: Minnesota
- Counties: Aitkin

Highway system
- Minnesota Trunk Highway System; Interstate; US; State; Legislative; Scenic
← MN 228	→ MN 235

Minnesota State Highway 232 (MN 232) was a 9.540-mile-long (15.353 km) highway in northeast Minnesota, which ran from its intersection with Aitkin County Road 3 on the east edge of Palisade and continued east to its eastern terminus at its intersection with State Highway 65 and Aitkin County Road 14 in Shamrock Township, near Big Sandy Lake and the town of McGregor. Almost sixteen years after the Minnesota Legislature repealed MN 232's route definition in 1996, MnDOT and Aitkin County finally came to an agreement in April 2012 to transfer the road to the county, which became an extension of Aitkin County Road 3.

== Route description ==
Highway 232 served as an east–west route in northeast Minnesota between Palisade and State Highway 65. It crosses the Mississippi River at Palisade.

Savanna Portage State Park is located 11 miles northeast of the junction of former MN 232, MN 65, and County Road 14 (CR 14) in Shamrock Township. The park entrance is located on CR 14 in nearby Balsam Township.

== History ==
Highway 232 was authorized on July 1, 1949.

The route was paved in 1959.

In 1996, the Minnesota Legislature approved removal of Route 232 from the state trunk highway system, becoming effective when MnDOT and Aitkin County agreed on a turnback plan; however, no agreement was reached. An article in the Aitkin newspaper in mid-June 1999 stated that only in recent months had MnDOT offered to give the county $4.3 million to repair and take control of the route. A $1.7 million Mississippi River bridge replacement in 2000 might have been part of the turnback agreement.

Finally, on April 15, 2012, MnDOT and Aitkin County finalized an agreement to transfer the road to county control. Despite the agreement, MN 232 continued to be present in MnDOT route logs as recently as February 2013, but it was finally removed from the November 2013 release.

== Major intersections ==
The entire route is in Aitkin County.

Location	mi	km	Destinations	Notes
Palisade	0.000	0.000	CR 3 (Main Street)	
Palisade	0.045	0.072	CR 5 north	
Palisade	0.231	0.372	CR 10	
Mississippi River	0.287– 0.341	0.462– 0.549	480th Street Bridge	
Logan Township	0.599	0.964	CR 5 south	
Workman Township	6.619	10.652	CR 62	
Workman Township	8.332	13.409	CR 63	
Shamrock Township	9.213– 9.257	14.827– 14.898	Flowage Lake	
Shamrock Township	9.558	15.382	MN 65 / CR 14 east	
1.000 mi = 1.609 km; 1.000 km = 0.621 mi
