= East Savanna River =

River in Minnesota, United States

Coordinates: 46°55′21″N 92°54′18″W

Location
- Country: United States

Physical characteristics
- Source
  - location: Wolf Lake, Aitkin County, Minnesota
  - elevation: 1,266 feet (386 m)
- Mouth
  - elevation: 1,230 feet (370 m)

The East Savanna River is a small yet historic stream in Aitkin and Saint Louis counties in the U.S. state of Minnesota. With a total length of 15.3 miles (24.6 km), the river rises in Wolf Lake, a small body of water within a spruce bog in Savanna Portage State Park, and flows northeasterly to the Saint Louis River at Floodwood, whence its waters flow to Lake Superior through the Great Lakes and the Saint Lawrence River to the Atlantic Ocean. A few thousand years ago the East Savanna was part of the Mississippi River itself, originating in northeast Minnesota and flowing southwesterly to Big Sandy Lake, from which the great river drained down its present valley to the Gulf of Mexico.

The low divide which now separates the Mississippi tributaries from the East Savanna was part of a historic trade route connecting the Saint Lawrence and Great Lakes to the Mississippi basin, used by fur traders and explorers. Part of that route, including the headwaters of the East and West Savanna Rivers, is now within Savanna Portage State Park.

== Name ==
The river, and the West Savanna River located a half-mile (0.8 km) to the west of Wolf Lake, on the other side of the Saint Lawrence River Divide, kept the name given by French explorers, la Savanne. This French word for savanna originally is of Native American origin, and meant a "treeless area". The word was used here to refer to the marshy grasslands where the river begins and through which it flows. The Ojibwe name, Mashkiig-onigami-ziibi, was more precise, being translated as "marsh-portage river".

== Geology ==
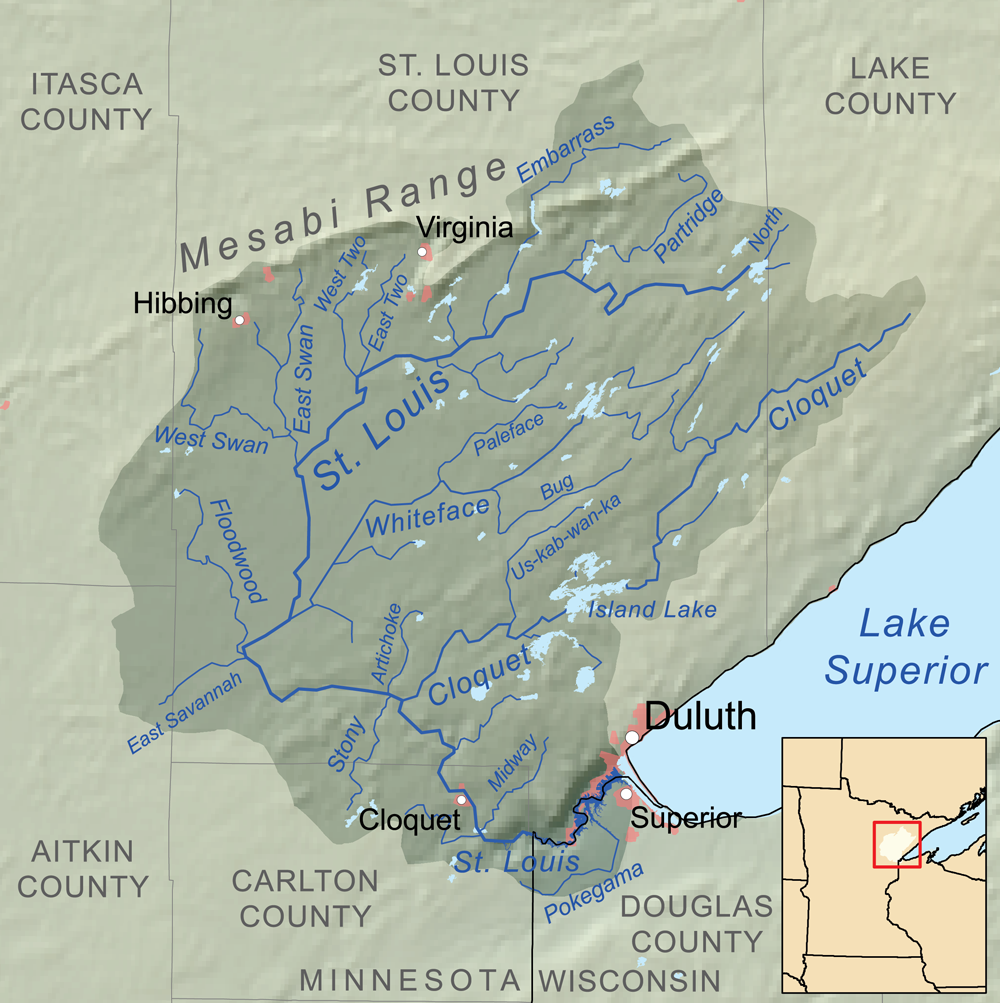
Saint Louis River and tributaries; East Savanna River originates in Aitkin County (at left)

As the last continental glacier melted, Lake Upham was formed from its glacial meltwaters. As that lake receded, its watershed at first was drained by the Mississippi River, which rose from the northeast at the present headwaters of the Saint Louis River, and flowed southwest to Sandy Lake along the course of the East Savanna. By the process of stream piracy, the smaller Saint Louis River captured the Cloquet River and then the Mississippi east of the present divide, diverting their waters southeast to Lake Superior. In fact, the river now known as the East Savanna reversed its course; it once was the far upper Mississippi, flowing southwesterly here on its journey to the Gulf of Mexico, but after the Saint Louis River eroded its way upward to Floodwood, it became the present small, northeastward-flowing tributary of the Saint Louis in the Saint Lawrence watershed.

== Ecology ==
The Lake Upham lacustrine plain is part of the Tamarack Lowlands Subsection within the Northern Minnesota Drift Plains Section of the Laurentian Mixed Forest. Sediments deposited by the glacial lake are parent to the present soils of peats, silt, and sand; the peats are in marshes which dominate the upper reaches of the river. These marshes, in which the river rises and through which it flows, were known as the "Great Savannah". The lower course was a winding stream with clay banks through a mixed forest; beavers dropped many trees into and across the river.

The river now flows through a channel, following the section line from Wolf Lake east for about four miles (six km), then angling northeast and east through what is now prosaically named "Judicial Ditch No. 3". The ditching neither drained the marsh nor made it suitable for agriculture: "The land is still hopeless swamp, and so far as anyone can now see will always remain so." As the river leaves the east boundary of Savanna Portage State Park and enters Saint Louis County, local relief begins to increase, and the channel crosses and obliterates the meanders and oxbows of the former naturally-flowing river.

== History ==
"The stream wound sluggishly between low banks covered with long grass, from which shot lofty trees, aspen, maple, ash, elm, birch, hemlock, pine, and fir, that met overhead, and formed an agreeable shade from the noonday sun. . . .
After we had followed the tortuous river for some miles, we suddenly found ourselves in a labyrinth of channels winding among long rushes, and we were informed that we had entered the Great Savannah itself. As, however, the rushes almost met overhead, it was impossible to form any impression of it . . . [W]e . . . found ourselves upon a small circular island, . . . from which we could take an inspection of the Savannah, which was nothing more than a boundless swamp . . . ."
—Laurence Oliphant, Minnesota and the Far West, 1855

The stream was part of the Northwest Trail, and led to the Savanna Portage, a historic trade route between the Great Lakes and the Mississippi River basin in central North America. Members of the First Nations, and later fur traders, missionaries, and explorers, ascended the Saint Louis River from its mouth at Fond du Lac (in modern Duluth, Minnesota), then went up the East Savanna to the portage, crossed the portage and the divide to the West Savanna, and descended that stream to the Prairie River and Big Sandy Lake to the Mississippi.

In preindustrial times, the winding river was some 24 miles (about 40 km) from the Saint Louis to the start of the portage. Prior to the channelization of the river described above, Muskeg Lake, several miles to the south of the start of the portage, was considered to be the source. In truth, both Wolf and Muskeg Lakes were open areas of water in the same enormous and impassable marsh then known as the "Great Savannah", and travellers took the portage to avoid the worst part of this marsh. With the channelization of the river, Muskeg Lake is no longer open water, and the actual distance from the start of the portage to the river's outlet is only 15.3 miles (24.6 km), as the meanders have been substantially eliminated.

== See also ==
- List of rivers of Minnesota
