= Floodwood =

Floodwood may refer to a location in the United States:

- Floodwood, Michigan, a community in Sagola Township, Dickinson County
- Floodwood, Minnesota, a city in St. Louis County
- Floodwood Township, St. Louis County, Minnesota
- Floodwood Mountain Reservation, a Boy Scouts of America site in Saranac Lake, New York
- Floodwood River (Michigan), in Ontonagon County
- Floodwood River (Minnesota)
