= Sandy Lake, Minnesota =

Unincorporated community in Minnesota, US

Sandy Lake Gaa-mitaawangaagamaag
- Unincorporated community
- Location within Minnesota Location within the United States
- Coordinates: 46°47′57.5″N 93°15′03.5″W
- Country: United States
- State: Minnesota
- County: Aitkin
- Township: Turner Township
- Elevation: 1,230 ft (370 m)
- Time zone: UTC-6 (Central (CST))
  - Summer (DST): UTC-5 (CDT)
- ZIP code: 55760
- Area code: 218
- GNIS feature ID: 2419129

Sandy Lake is an unincorporated community Native American village located in Turner Township, Aitkin County, Minnesota, United States. Its name in the Ojibwe language is Gaa-mitaawangaagamaag, meaning "Place of the Sandy-shored Lake". The village is administrative center for the Sandy Lake Band of Mississippi Chippewa, though the administration of the Mille Lacs Indian Reservation, District II, is located in the nearby East Lake.

== History ==
The original village was seasonally mobile, located anywhere along the shores of Big Sandy Lake or along the Savanna Portage, fostering both trade along the portage and of hunting, fishing and gathering of foods, medicine and other materials. In 1850, without much notice Sandy Lake hosted the United States' annuity payments to the Ojibwe. However, due to intentional poor planning on behalf of the United States, Sandy Lake experienced the Sandy Lake Tragedy that led to the death of over 300 guests of the community.

In 1855, the Gaa-mitaawangaagamaag Ishkonigan (Sandy Lake Indian Reservation) was established under the 1855 Treaty of Washington (10 Stat. 1165), along with five other Indian Reservations for the Mississippi Chippewas and three Indian Reservations for the Pillager Chippewas. With the Dakota War of 1862, the Sandy Lake Band went with the Mille Lacs band to Fort Ripley to offer to fight the Sioux. Consequently, the Sandy Lake Band was not forced to relocate elsewhere. However, many were pressured to do so, with many members relocating to the White Oak Point Indian Reservation. Those who remained were in such a minority the Sandy Lake Indian Reservation allotments under the Nelson Act and forced land-sales illegally erased the Reservation off the maps. In 1915, with the assistance from the neighboring Fond du Lac Band, the Sandy Lake Cemetery was again secured. In 1940, the current village site was secured.
