= Floodwood River =

Floodwood River may refer to:

- Floodwood River (Michigan)
- Floodwood River (Minnesota)
