= Minnesota State Highway 235 =

State highway in Minnesota, United States

Trunk Highway 235
- MN 235 highlighted in red

Route information
- Maintained by MnDOT
- Length: 10.027 mi (16.137 km)
- Existed: July 1, 1949–2013

Major junctions
- West end: CR 59 at Urbank
- East end: MN 29 at Parkers Prairie

Location
- Country: United States
- State: Minnesota
- Counties: Otter Tail

Highway system
- Minnesota Trunk Highway System; Interstate; US; State; Legislative; Scenic
← MN 232	→ MN 237

Minnesota State Highway 235 (MN 235) was a 10.027-mile-long (16.137 km) highway in west-central Minnesota, which ran from its intersection with Otter Tail County Road 59 in Urbank and continued east to its eastern terminus at its intersection with State Highway 29 in Parkers Prairie. In 2013, the route was removed from the state highway system. The route became an extension of Otter Tail County Road 38.

== Route description ==
Highway 235 served as an east–west connector route in west-central Minnesota between Urbank and Parkers Prairie.

Highway 235 was also known as West Main Street in Parkers Prairie and Main Street in Urbank.

Inspiration Peak State Wayside Park was located 4 miles west of the junction of Highway 235 and County State-Aid Highway 38 at Urbank. The park entrance is located on County State-Aid Highway 38 in nearby Leaf Mountain Township.

The route was legally defined as Route 235 in the Minnesota Statutes until 2013.

== History ==
Highway 235 was authorized on July 1, 1949.

The eastern half of the route was paved in 1950. The remainder was paved in 1952.

== Major intersections ==
The entire route is in Otter Tail County.

Location	mi	km	Destinations	Notes
Urbank	0.000	0.000	CR 59 (Central Avenue), CR 38 (Main Street) west	
Effington Township	3.045	4.900	CR 63	
Effington Township	5.718	9.202	CR 129	
Parkers Prairie Township	7.660	12.328	CR 79	
Parkers Prairie	10.027	16.137	MN 29 (Otter Avenue), CR 46 (E. Main Street) east	
1.000 mi = 1.609 km; 1.000 km = 0.621 mi
