= Spencer Township, Aitkin County, Minnesota =

Township in Minnesota, United States

Spencer Township
- Township
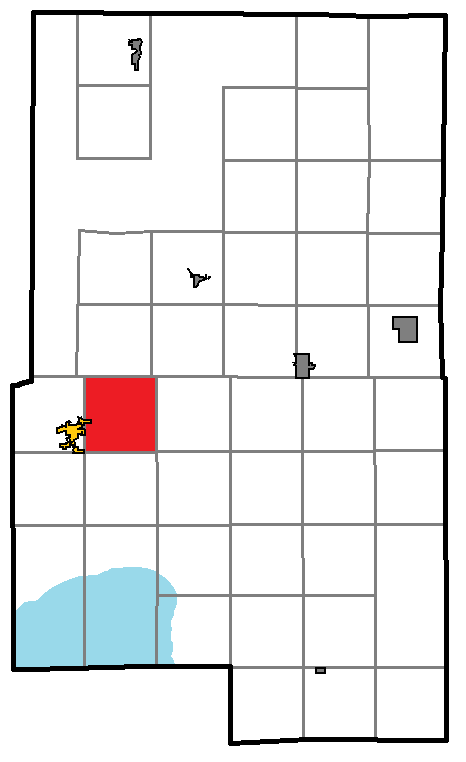
- Location of Spencer Township, within Aitkin County, Minnesota
- Coordinates: 46°32′11″N 93°37′49″W
- Country: United States
- State: Minnesota
- County: Aitkin

Area
  - Total: 37.7 sq mi (97.6 km^{2})
  - Land: 36.9 sq mi (95.7 km^{2})
  - Water: 0.73 sq mi (1.9 km^{2})
- Elevation: 1,211 ft (369 m)

Population (2020)
  - Total: 522
  - Density: 14.1/sq mi (5.45/km^{2})
- Time zone: UTC-6 (Central (CST))
  - Summer (DST): UTC-5 (CDT)
- ZIP code: 56431
- Area code: 218
- FIPS code: 27-61654
- GNIS feature ID: 0665661

Spencer Township is a township in Aitkin County, Minnesota, United States. The population was 522 as of the 2020 census.

== Geography ==
According to the United States Census Bureau, the township has a total area of 37.7 square miles (97.6 km^{2}), of which 36.9 square miles (95.7 km^{2}) is land and 0.73 square miles (1.9 km^{2}), or 1.96%, is water.

The east edge of the city of Aitkin extends into the township, but is a separate entity.

=== Major highways ===
- U.S. Highway 169
- Minnesota State Highway 47
- Minnesota State Highway 210

=== Lakes ===
- Hanson Lake
- Johnson Lake
- Little Hanson Lake
- Olson Lake
- Sisabagamah Lake (north half)
- Soderman Lakes (northeast quarter)

=== Adjacent townships ===
- Morrison Township (north)
- Fleming Township (northeast)
- Kimberly Township (east)
- Glen Township (southeast)
- Nordland Township (south)
- Farm Island Township (southwest)
- Aitkin Township (west)

=== Cemeteries ===
The township contains these three cemeteries: Church of the Blessed Virgin, Evergreen and Spencer.

== Demographics ==
As of the census of 2000, there were 602 people, 222 households, and 166 families residing in the township. The population density was 16.3 people per square mile (6.3/km^{2}). There were 258 housing units at an average density of 7.0/sq mi (2.7/km^{2}). The racial makeup of the township was 97.51% White, 1.16% Native American, 0.33% Asian, 0.17% Pacific Islander, 0.50% from other races, and 0.33% from two or more races. Hispanic or Latino of any race were 0.66% of the population.

There were 222 households, out of which 38.3% had children under the age of 18 living with them, 67.1% were married couples living together, 3.6% had a female householder with no husband present, and 25.2% were non-families. 19.4% of all households were made up of individuals, and 8.1% had someone living alone who was 65 years of age or older. The average household size was 2.71 and the average family size was 3.11.

In the township the population was spread out, with 28.4% under the age of 18, 5.0% from 18 to 24, 24.8% from 25 to 44, 29.2% from 45 to 64, and 12.6% who were 65 years of age or older. The median age was 39 years. For every 100 females, there were 102.7 males. For every 100 females age 18 and over, there were 99.5 males.

The median income for a household in the township was $63,542, and the median income for a family was $73,365. Males had a median income of $77,708 versus $41,875 for females. The per capita income for the township was $37,396. About 1.6% of families and 3.7% of the population were below the poverty line, including 8.5% of those under age 18 and 8.7% of those age 65 or over.
