= Ball Bluff Township, Aitkin County, Minnesota =

Township in Minnesota, United States

Ball Bluff Township
- Township
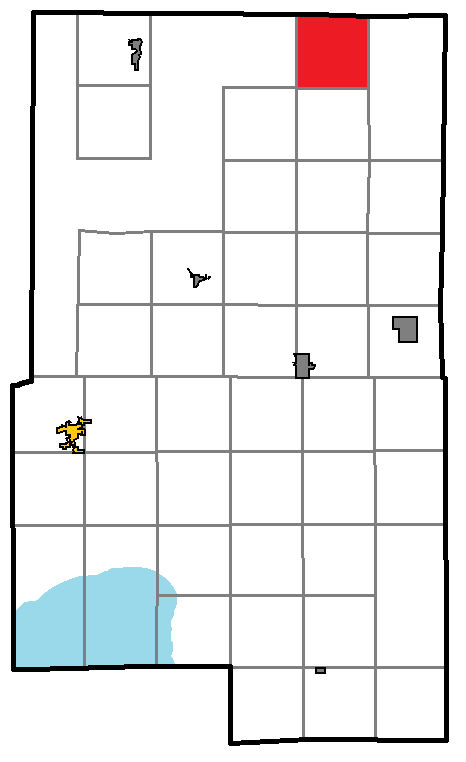
- Location of Ball Bluff Township within Aitkin County, Minnesota
- Coordinates: 46°59′38″N 93°15′46″W
- Country: United States
- State: Minnesota
- County: Aitkin

Area
  - Total: 35.2 sq mi (91.2 km^{2})
  - Land: 33.9 sq mi (87.9 km^{2})
  - Water: 1.3 sq mi (3.3 km^{2})
- Elevation: 1,273 ft (388 m)

Population (2020)
  - Total: 270
  - Density: 8.0/sq mi (3.1/km^{2})
- Time zone: UTC-6 (Central (CST))
  - Summer (DST): UTC-5 (CDT)
- ZIP code: 55752
- Area code: 218
- FIPS code: 27-03358
- GNIS feature ID: 0663498

Ball Bluff Township is a township in Aitkin County, Minnesota, United States. The population was 270 as of the 2020 census. The 2021 population estimate is 274.

== History ==
Ball Bluff is a corruption of Bald Bluff, a glacial morainic drift with a treeless, grassy top. It was incorporated May 26, 1900.

== Geography ==
According to the United States Census Bureau, the township has a total area of 35.2 square miles (91.2 km^{2}), of which 87.9 square kilometres (33.9 sq mi) is land and 1.3 square miles (3.3 km^{2}), or 3.62%, is water.

=== Major highways ===
- Minnesota State Highway 65
- Minnesota State Highway 200

=== Lakes ===
- Hay Lake
- Little Ball Bluff Lake (north quarter)
- Vanduse Lake

=== Adjacent townships ===
- Sago Township, Itasca County (north)
- Wawina Township, Itasca County (northeast)
- Cornish Township (south)
- Verdon Township (southwest)

=== Cemeteries ===
The township contains Ball Bluff Cemetery.

== Demographics ==
As of the census of 2000, there were 300 people, 121 households, and 86 families residing in the township. The population density was 8.9 inhabitants per square mile (3.4/km^{2}). There were 207 housing units at an average density of 6.1 per square mile (2.4/km^{2}). The racial makeup of the township was 98.67% White, 0.67% Native American, and 0.67% from two or more races.

There were 121 households, out of which 28.9% had children under the age of 18 living with them, 62.0% were married couples living together, 3.3% had a female householder with no husband present, and 28.9% were non-families. 25.6% of all households were made up of individuals, and 8.3% had someone living alone who was 65 years of age or older. The average household size was 2.48 and the average family size was 2.92.

In the township the population was spread out, with 22.7% under the age of 18, 4.7% from 18 to 24, 25.3% from 25 to 44, 31.3% from 45 to 64, and 16.0% who were 65 years of age or older. The median age was 43 years. For every 100 females, there were 102.7 males. For every 100 females age 18 and over, there were 101.7 males.

The median income for a household in the township was $33,750, and the median income for a family was $45,625. Males had a median income of $36,667 versus $21,500 for females. The per capita income for the township was $16,602. About 19.6% of families and 28.4% of the population were below the poverty line, including 47.9% of those under the age of eighteen and 10.5% of those 65 or over.
