= McGregor Township, Aitkin County, Minnesota =

Township in Minnesota, United States

McGregor Township
- Township
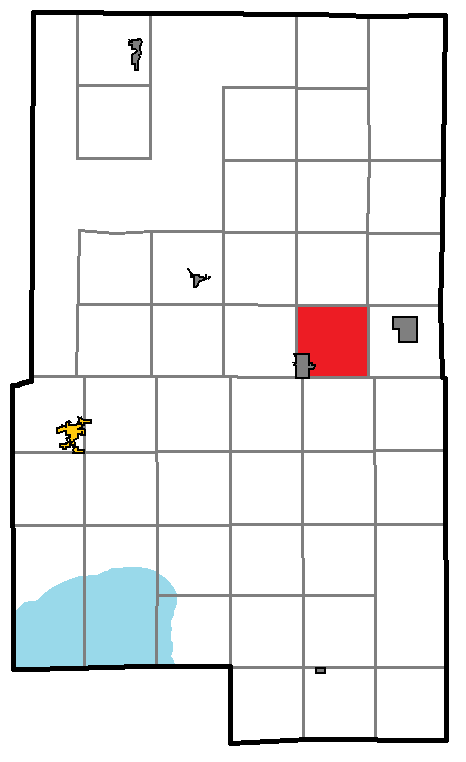
- Location of McGregor Township, within Aitkin County, Minnesota
- Coordinates: 46°37′19″N 93°16′0″W
- Country: United States
- State: Minnesota
- County: Aitkin

Area
  - Total: 34.2 sq mi (88.5 km^{2})
  - Land: 33.0 sq mi (85.5 km^{2})
  - Water: 1.2 sq mi (3.1 km^{2})
- Elevation: 1,230 ft (375 m)

Population (2020)
  - Total: 96
  - Density: 2.9/sq mi (1.1/km^{2})
- Time zone: UTC-6 (Central (CST))
  - Summer (DST): UTC-5 (CDT)
- ZIP code: 55760
- Area code: 218
- FIPS code: 27-39032
- GNIS feature ID: 0664860

McGregor Township is a township in Aitkin County, Minnesota, United States. The population was 96 as of the 2020 census.

== Geography ==
According to the United States Census Bureau, the township has a total area of 34.2 square miles (88.5 km^{2}), of which 33.0 square miles (85.5 km^{2}) is land and 1.2 square miles (3.1 km^{2}), or 3.46%, is water.

The city of McGregor lies within the township but is a separate entity.

=== Major highways ===
- Minnesota State Highway 65
- Minnesota State Highway 210

=== Lakes ===
- Mud Lake

=== Adjacent townships ===
- Shamrock Township (north)
- Haugen Township (northeast)
- Clark Township (east)
- Spalding Township (south)
- Jevne Township (west)
- Workman Township (northwest)

=== Cemeteries ===
The township contains the following cemeteries: Carr Memorial, Grayling and Union.

== Demographics ==
As of the census of 2000, there were 116 people, 51 households, and 31 families residing in the township. The population density was 3.5 people per square mile (1.4/km^{2}). There were 66 housing units at an average density of 2.0/sq mi (0.8/km^{2}). The racial makeup of the township was 98.28% White and 1.72% Native American.

There were 51 households, out of which 25.5% had children under the age of 18 living with them, 56.9% were married couples living together, 2.0% had a female householder with no husband present, and 37.3% were non-families. 33.3% of all households were made up of individuals, and 13.7% had someone living alone who was 65 years of age or older. The average household size was 2.27 and the average family size was 2.94.

In the township the population was spread out, with 21.6% under the age of 18, 4.3% from 18 to 24, 25.9% from 25 to 44, 29.3% from 45 to 64, and 19.0% who were 65 years of age or older. The median age was 42 years. For every 100 females, there were 90.2 males. For every 100 females age 18 and over, there were 102.2 males.

The median income for a household in the township was $28,542, and the median income for a family was $31,563. Males had a median income of $18,750 versus $26,250 for females. The per capita income for the township was $13,003. None of the population and none of the families were below the poverty line.
