= Cornish Township, Aitkin County, Minnesota =

Township in Minnesota, United States

Cornish Township
- Township
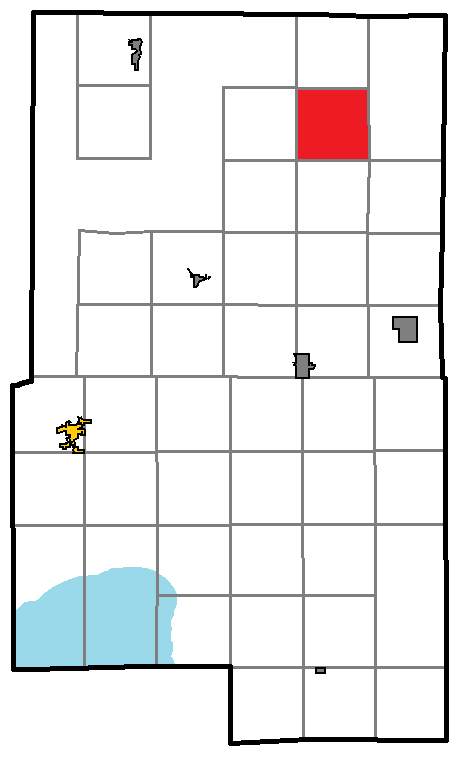
- Location of Cornish Township, within Aitkin County, Minnesota
- Coordinates: 46°53′49″N 93°17′0″W
- Country: United States
- State: Minnesota
- County: Aitkin

Area
  - Total: 35.9 sq mi (92.9 km^{2})
  - Land: 34.4 sq mi (89.0 km^{2})
  - Water: 1.5 sq mi (3.9 km^{2})
- Elevation: 1,299 ft (396 m)

Population (2020)
  - Total: 45
  - Density: 1.3/sq mi (0.51/km^{2})
- Time zone: UTC-6 (Central (CST))
  - Summer (DST): UTC-5 (CDT)
- FIPS code: 27-13330
- GNIS feature ID: 0663874

Cornish Township is a township in Aitkin County, Minnesota, United States. The population was 45 as of the 2020 census.

== History ==
Cornish Township was named for Charles E. and Milo F. Cornish, early settlers. It was incorporated on August 6, 1906.

== Geography ==
According to the United States Census Bureau, the township has a total area of 35.9 square miles (92.9 km^{2}), of which 34.4 square miles (89.0 km^{2}) is land and 1.5 square miles (3.9 km^{2}), or 4.22%, is water.

=== Major highway ===
- Minnesota State Highway 65

=== Lakes ===
- Ball Bluff Lake
- Bay Lake
- Blackface Lake
- Boot Lake
- Cutaway Lake
- Little Ball Bluff Lake (south three-quarters)
- Little Red Horse Lake
- Long Lake
- Rat House Lake

=== Adjacent townships ===
- Ball Bluff Township (north)
- Balsam Township (southeast)
- Turner Township (south)
- Libby Township (southwest)
- Verdon Township (west)

== Demographics ==
As of the census of 2000, there were 27 people, 13 households, and 10 families residing in the township. The population density was 0.8 inhabitants per square mile (0.31/km^{2}). There were 66 housing units at an average density of 1.9 per square mile (0.73/km^{2}). The racial makeup of the township was 100.00% White. Hispanic or Latino of any race were 3.70% of the population.

There were 13 households, out of which none had children under the age of 18 living with them, 69.2% were married couples living together, 7.7% had a female householder with no husband present, and 15.4% were non-families. 15.4% of all households were made up of individuals, and 7.7% had someone living alone who was 65 years of age or older. The average household size was 2.08 and the average family size was 2.27.

In the township the population was spread out, with 7.4% from 18 to 24, 11.1% from 25 to 44, 51.9% from 45 to 64, and 29.6% who were 65 years of age or older. The median age was 61 years. For every 100 females, there were 107.7 males. For every 100 females age 18 and over, there were 107.7 males.

The median income for a household in the township was $28,500, and the median income for a family was $29,000. Males had a median income of $28,750 versus $17,500 for females. The per capita income for the township was $16,188. None of the population and none of the families were below the poverty line.
