= Savanna State Forest =

State forest in Minnesota, United States

- Location within Minnesota
- Interactive map of Savanna State Forest

Geography
- Location: Aitkin and Saint Louis counties, Minnesota, United States
- Coordinates: 46°49′05″N 93°10′36″W
- Area: 218,450 acres (88,400 ha)

Administration
- Authority: Minnesota DNR
- Website: www.dnr.state.mn.us/state_forests/forest.html?id=sft00046#homepage

The Savanna State Forest is located in Aitkin and Saint Louis counties in the U.S. State of Minnesota. Comprising over 238,000 acres, the forest is bisected by the Upper Mississippi River, and contains Savanna Portage State Park, which preserves a historic trade route connecting the Mississippi River with upper reaches of the Saint Lawrence River drainage basin.

The forest has white-tailed deer, ruffed grouse, waterfowl, songbirds, and many other species. The most popular fish in Big Sandy Lake and other lakes in the forest are bass, panfish, walleye, and northern pike.
