= Savanna Portage State Park =

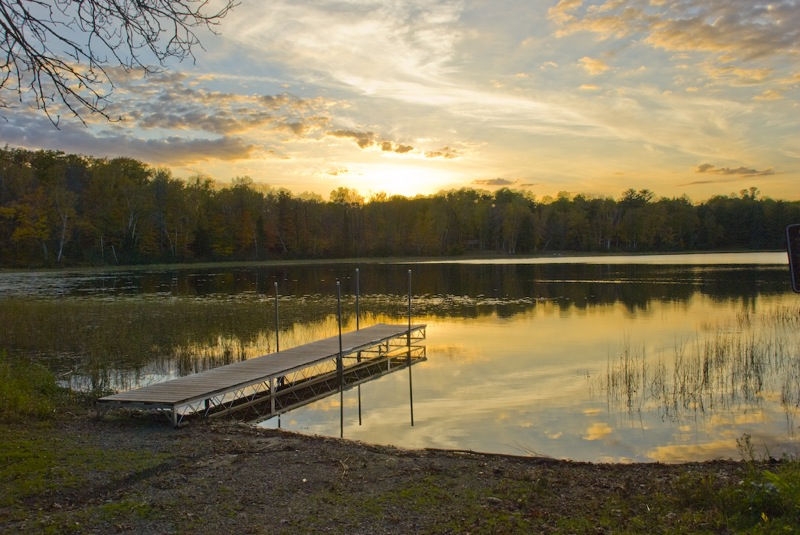
- Boat launch on Lake Shumway

- Location within Minnesota Location within the United States
- Location: Minnesota, United States
- Coordinates: 46°50′15″N 93°9′24″W
- Area: 15,200 acres (62 km^{2})
- Elevation: 1,280 ft (390 m)
- Established: 1961; 65 years ago
- Governing body: Minnesota Department of Natural Resources
- Website: Savanna Portage State Park

- Savanna Portage
- U.S. National Register of Historic Places
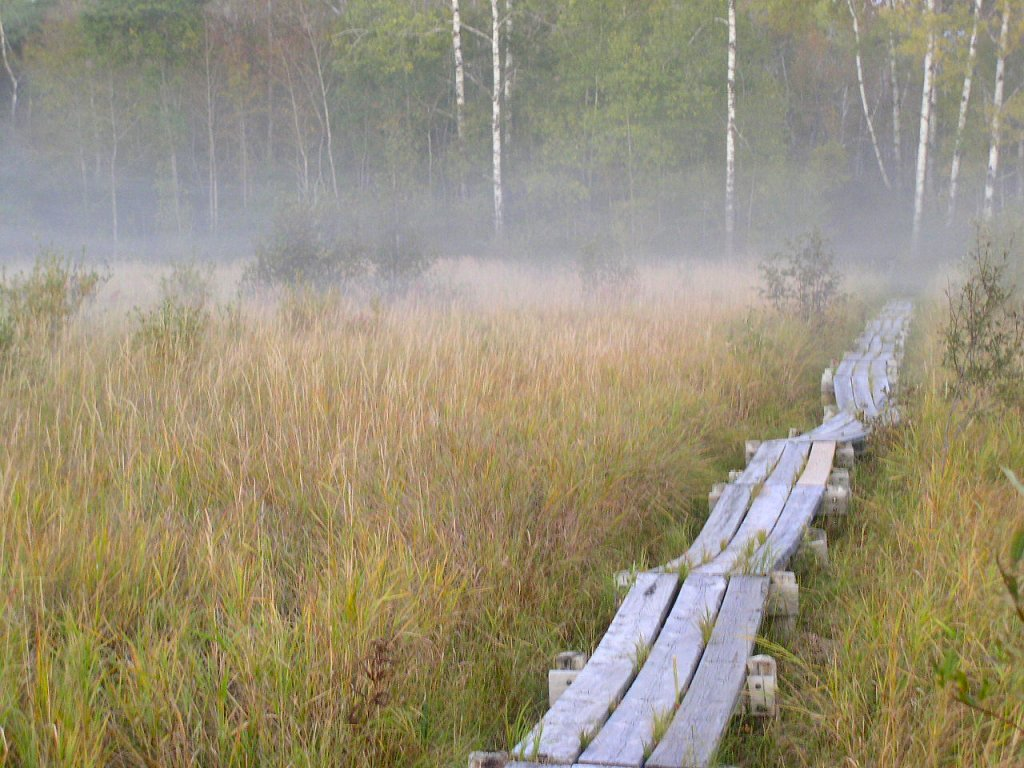
- The Savanna Portage crossed this marsh without benefit of this modern boardwalk
- Location: Balsam Township, Minnesota
- Area: 3,200 acres (1,300 ha)
- NRHP reference No.: 73000963
- Added to NRHP: April 23, 1973; 53 years ago

Savanna Portage State Park is a state park in the U.S. State of Minnesota established in 1961 to preserve the historic Savanna Portage, a difficult 6-mile (9.7 km) trail connecting the watersheds of the Mississippi River and Lake Superior. The portage trail crosses a drainage divide separating the West Savanna River, which drains to the Mississippi River and the Gulf of Mexico, from the East Savanna River, which flows in an opposite direction to the Saint Louis River, Lake Superior and the Great Lakes, and the Saint Lawrence River to the Atlantic Ocean.

Savanna Portage was a canoe portage used by Native Americans for centuries before being used by European explorers, fur traders, Voyageurs, coureurs des bois, and missionaries of the 18th and 19th centuries. It was a vital link connecting the Mississippi waterways to the west with the Great Lakes to the east. The portage was listed on the National Register of Historic Places in 1973 for having state-level significance in the themes of commerce, exploration/settlement, and transportation. The park which contains it is 17 miles (27 km) north and east of McGregor, Minnesota, and approximately 50 miles (80 km) west of Duluth, Minnesota.

== Geology and topography ==
The park is located on the divide between the watersheds of the Great Lakes and the Gulf of Mexico, both of which drain to the Atlantic Ocean. The area is a low-relief plain which was once a glacial lakebed. During the last phase of the Wisconsinan glaciation, the deteriorating continental glacier left behind connected lakes, known as Glacial Lakes Aitkin and Upham. Formed by the retreat of the Saint Louis Sublobe of the Superior Lobe of the glacier, Lake Upham drained through Lake Aitkin to the Mississippi River through Big Sandy Lake. The retreating glacier and the lakes deposited sand and sediments in the lakebed. As the lakes drained these sediments became the present plain.

The plain at first was drained by the Cloquet River, which then ran west to the Mississippi River. By the process of stream piracy, the smaller Saint Louis River, which runs to Lake Superior, captured the Cloquet River and most of its drainage basin. This left behind the East Savanna River which drains into the Saint Louis River, Lake Superior, the lower Great Lakes, and the Saint Lawrence River, and to the west, the West Savanna River, which is tributary to the Mississippi River via the Prairie River and Big Sandy Lake.

The old lake plain is part of the Tamarack Lowlands Subsection within the Northern Minnesota Drift Plains Section of the Laurentian Mixed Forest. Lacustrine sediments deposited by the glacial lake are parent to the present soils of peats, silt, and sand; the peats are in marshes which form large parts of the park. These wet lowlands adjoin rolling hills which are end moraines of the recent glaciation. The moraines are part of the Saint Louis Moraines Subdivision of the Northern Minnesota Drift Plain.

== Savanna Portage ==
The plain in the old lakebed provided a low and very swampy overland route across the divide between the East and West Savanna Rivers. Wolf Lake, source of the East Savanna River, is only about 800 yards (730 m) east of Savanna Lake on the West Savanna. As the areas adjoining Wolf Lake and the upper East Savanna River are quite wet, the route selected for the portage trail departed from the river further downstream, shortening the distance to be traveled through the bog. The portage, some 6 miles (9.7 km) long, starts in the swamp and then goes west in a wooded upland to reach the West Savanna River.

Long used by Native Americans, it became a thoroughfare between the Great Lakes and the Mississippi Valley for explorers, missionaries, and fur traders. Travelers from the east exited Lake Superior near Fond du Lac ("end of the lake", or more idiomatically "head of the lake", where Duluth is now located), and ascended the steep, rocky, and difficult gorge of the lower Saint Louis River, which falls some 450 feet (140 m) from the location of Carlton, Minnesota, through what is now Jay Cooke State Park to its outlet at the lake. Above Carlton travelers proceeded upstream through quieter stretches to the location of Floodwood, Minnesota, where they turned southwest up the sluggish East Savanna River in the bed of Glacial Lake Upham. Coming to a small rise, the travelers commenced the portage, which in its eastern reaches was marshy, mosquito-infested, and among the most unpleasant and tortuous of all the routes taken by the voyageurs. Struggling waist-deep through the morass of the "boundless swamp", travelers eventually reached a hardwood forest, through which the trail ran to the West Savanna River, which drains Prairie Lake to Big Sandy Lake and the Upper Mississippi River. In times of low water, the portage was drier but the river became too shallow for canoes, so voyageurs would continue to hike overland to the northeast bay of Big Sandy Lake.

The portage likely was used by Europeans as early as 1679, when Daniel Greysolon, Sieur du Lhut visited a Sioux village at Big Sandy Lake during his exploration of the Lake Superior region and the Upper Mississippi River. Among the portage's users were fur traders who operated in the upper Mississippi River valley. Some went no further than the American Fur Company's large regional trading post on Big Sandy Lake operated by William Aitkin in the 1820s and 1830s, the years of peak usage of the route. Explorers and scientists crossing the portage included David Thompson, British explorer of Canada and North West Fur Company cartographer, in 1798; Zebulon Pike, early explorer of the American west, in 1805; Lewis Cass, American general and explorer, in his unsuccessful 1820 search for the source of the Mississippi River; Henry Schoolcraft, geologist and explorer, who accompanied Cass in 1820 and led an expedition in 1832 to find the Mississippi River's source; Joseph Nicollet, French geographer and cartographer of the Upper Mississippi River, in 1836; and Laurence Oliphant, a British explorer and writer, in 1854. Tourists, including Count Ferdinand von Zeppelin, who crossed in 1863, also used the portage.

When the Northern Pacific Railroad, building west from Duluth reached nearby McGregor in 1870, the portage fell out of use for through traffic, but continued to be used for local trade and access to the interior. The trail's location was traced and marked in 1926 and in the 1940s through the 1960s, and with the use of archaeological techniques, it was more precisely marked in 1981. Most of the route is now maintained as a hiking trail.

== State park ==
The interest created by investigations into the trail's route inspired creation of Savanna Portage State Park in 1961. It is 14,000 acres (57 km^{2}) in size, and is the third-largest park in the state park system. It is nearly surrounded by the Savanna State Forest. At some 13.5 miles (21.7 km) long and nowhere more than 4 miles (6.4 km) wide, its shape is dictated in part by the portage corridor. 15,818 acres (64 km^{2}) of hills, lakes, and bogs now comprise the park. Activities include summer and winter camping, hiking, snowshoeing, and ski touring on the old portage and other trails, mountain biking, and snowmobiling, as well as swimming, fishing, canoeing, and boating on Loon Lake.

== Flora and fauna ==
Named for its open marshy grassland, the park's peat bogs and marshes include sedges and black spruce, tamarack, and white cedar. Uplands host a mixed hardwood and conifer forest of maple, oak, poplar, birch, white pine, and red pine.

Land animals in the area include moose, black bears, deer, wolves, coyotes, skunks, amphibians, and wood turtles. Birds include bald eagles, sharp-tailed grouse, warblers, boreal owls from Canada which winter in the area, sandhill cranes, trumpeter swans, and loons.

== See also ==
- National Register of Historic Places listings in Aitkin County, Minnesota
