= Fleming Township, Aitkin County, Minnesota =

Township in Minnesota, United States

Fleming Township
- Township
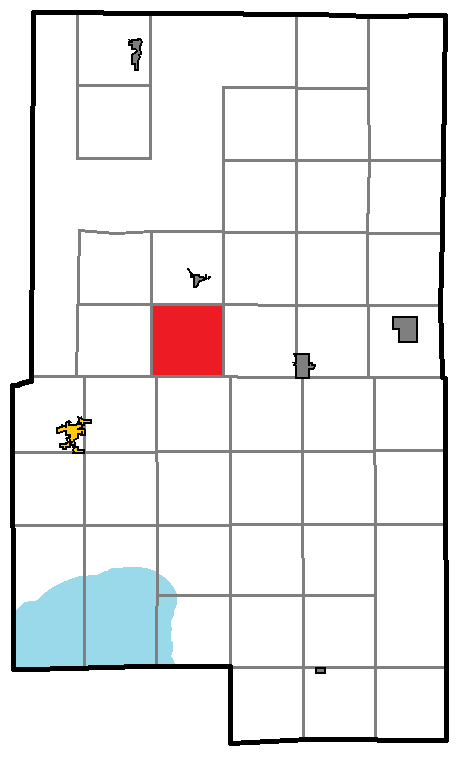
- Location of Fleming Township, within Aitkin County, Minnesota
- Coordinates: 46°38′17″N 93°30′40″W
- Country: United States
- State: Minnesota
- County: Aitkin

Area
  - Total: 36.3 sq mi (94.0 km^{2})
  - Land: 33.6 sq mi (87.0 km^{2})
  - Water: 2.7 sq mi (7.0 km^{2})
- Elevation: 1,220 ft (372 m)

Population (2020)
  - Total: 329
  - Density: 9.79/sq mi (3.78/km^{2})
- Time zone: UTC-6 (Central (CST))
  - Summer (DST): UTC-5 (CDT)
- FIPS code: 27-21230
- GNIS feature ID: 0664173

Fleming Township is a township in Aitkin County, Minnesota, United States. The population was 329 as of the 2020 census.

== History ==
Fleming Township was named for an early settler. A post office in Fleming Lake operated from 1909 to 1930.

== Geography ==
According to the United States Census Bureau, the township has a total area of 36.3 square miles (94.0 km^{2}), of which 33.6 square miles (87.0 km^{2}) and 2.7 square miles (7.0 km^{2}), or 7.40%, is water.

=== Major highway ===
- Minnesota State Highway 210

=== Lakes ===
- Fleming Lake
- French Lake
- Gun Lake
- Jenkins Lake
- Long Lake
- Town Line Lake (west edge)
- Whispering Lake
- Wilkins Lake

=== Adjacent townships ===
- Logan Township (north)
- Workman Township (northeast)
- Jevne Township (east)
- Kimberly Township (south)
- Spencer Township (southwest)
- Morrison Township (west)
- Waukenabo Township (northwest)

=== Cemeteries ===
The township contains Fleming Cemetery.

== Demographics ==
As of the census of 2000, there were 327 people, 151 households, and 107 families residing in the township. The population density was 9.7 inhabitants per square mile (3.7/km^{2}). There were 481 housing units at an average density of 14.3 per square mile (5.5/km^{2}). The racial makeup of the township was 98.17% White, 0.92% African American, 0.31% Native American, and 0.61% from two or more races. Hispanic or Latino of any race were 0.31% of the population.

There were 151 households, out of which 12.6% had children under the age of 18 living with them, 63.6% were married couples living together, 2.0% had a female householder with no husband present, and 28.5% were non-families. 22.5% of all households were made up of individuals, and 7.9% had someone living alone who was 65 years of age or older. The average household size was 2.17 and the average family size was 2.46.

In the township the population was spread out, with 12.5% under the age of 18, 4.6% from 18 to 24, 19.0% from 25 to 44, 36.4% from 45 to 64, and 27.5% who were 65 years of age or older. The median age was 52 years. For every 100 females, there were 112.3 males. For every 100 females age 18 and over, there were 120.0 males.

The median income for a household in the township was $37,500, and the median income for a family was $37,500. Males had a median income of $28,750 versus $21,250 for females. The per capita income for the township was $24,298. None of the families and 1.7% of the population were living below the poverty line, including no under eighteens and none of those over 64.
