= Shamrock Township, Aitkin County, Minnesota =

Township in Minnesota, United States

Shamrock Township
- Township
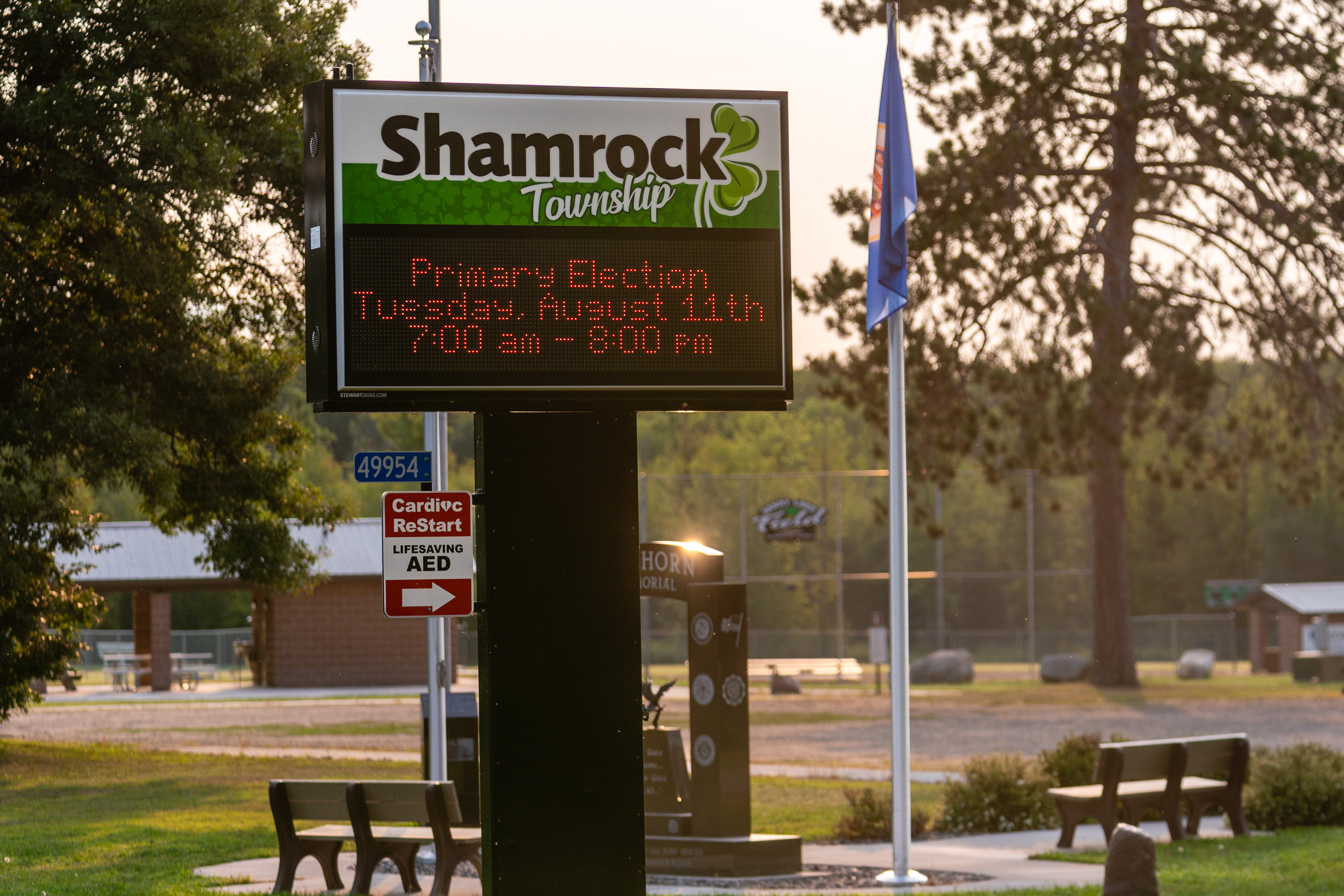
- Primary Election sign
- Motto: "A Township on the Grow"
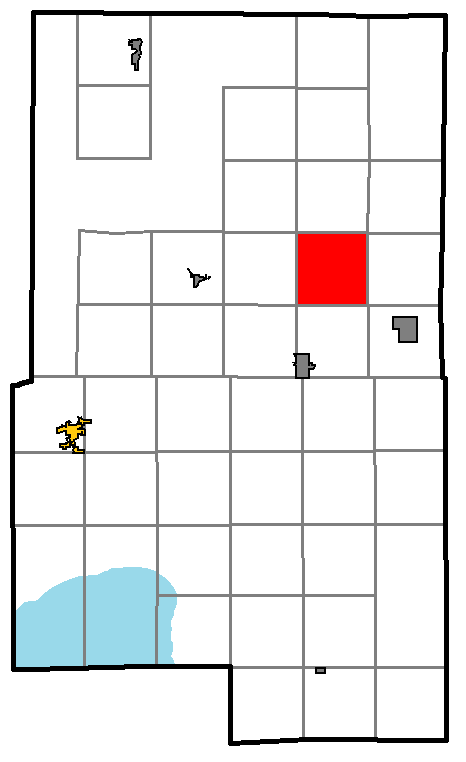
- Location of Shamrock Township, within Aitkin County, Minnesota
- Coordinates: 46°43′41″N 93°16′25″W
- Country: United States
- State: Minnesota
- County: Aitkin

Area
  - Total: 35.6 sq mi (92.1 km^{2})
  - Land: 24.5 sq mi (63.5 km^{2})
  - Water: 11.0 sq mi (28.5 km^{2})
- Elevation: 1,224 ft (373 m)

Population (2020)
  - Total: 1,215
  - Density: 49.6/sq mi (19.1/km^{2})
- Time zone: UTC-6 (Central (CST))
  - Summer (DST): UTC-5 (CDT)
- ZIP code: 55760
- Area code: 218
- FIPS code: 27-59368
- GNIS feature ID: 0665582
- Website: www.townofshamrock.org

Shamrock Township is a township in Aitkin County, Minnesota, United States. The population was 1,215 as of the 2020 census.

== History ==
Settled by Irish immigrants, Shamrock Township was named for the Shamrock, a national symbol of Ireland.

== Geography ==
According to the United States Census Bureau, the township has a total area of 35.6 square miles (92.1 km^{2}), of which 24.5 square miles (63.5 km^{2}) is land and 11.0 square miles (28.5 km^{2}), or 31.00%, is water. Several lakes are responsible for the high percentage of water area in the township; the largest are Big Sandy Lake and Lake Minnewawa.

=== Major highway ===
- Minnesota State Highway 65

=== Lakes ===
- Anderson Lake
- Big Sandy Lake (southeast half)
- Camp Lake
- Dollar Lake
- Flowage Lake (east quarter)
- Horseshoe Lake
- Island Lake (west quarter)
- Lake Minnewawa
- Mud Lake
- Round Lake (west half)
- Sandy River Lake (east half)

=== Adjacent townships ===
- Turner Township (north)
- Balsam Township (northeast)
- Haugen Township (east)
- Clark Township (southeast)
- McGregor Township (south)
- Jevne Township (southwest)
- Workman Township (west)
- Libby Township (northwest)

=== Cemeteries ===
The township contains these two cemeteries: Round Lake and Shamrock.

== Demographics ==
As of the census of 2000, there were 1,172 people, 557 households, and 365 families residing in the township. The population density was 47.8 inhabitants per square mile (18.5/km^{2}). There were 2,061 housing units at an average density of 84.1 per square mile (32.5/km^{2}). The racial makeup of the township was 93.52% White, 0.17% African American, 5.63% Native American, 0.09% Asian, 0.09% from other races, and 0.51% from two or more races. Hispanic or Latino of any race were 0.43% of the population.

There were 557 households, out of which 16.2% had children under the age of 18 living with them, 58.5% were married couples living together, 5.7% had a female householder with no husband present, and 34.3% were non-families. 29.1% of all households were made up of individuals, and 14.5% had someone living alone who was 65 years of age or older. The average household size was 2.10 and the average family size was 2.54.

In the township the population was spread out, with 16.4% under the age of 18, 4.2% from 18 to 24, 17.4% from 25 to 44, 31.3% from 45 to 64, and 30.7% who were 65 years of age or older. The median age was 54 years. For every 100 females, there were 107.4 males. For every 100 females age 18 and over, there were 103.7 males.

The median income for a household in the township was $29,688, and the median income for a family was $34,135. Males had a median income of $40,893 versus $22,614 for females. The per capita income for the township was $18,485. About 6.5% of families and 11.6% of the population were below the poverty line, including 19.3% of those under age 18 and 8.5% of those age 65 or over.
