= Verdon Township, Aitkin County, Minnesota =

Township in Minnesota, United States

Verdon Township
- Township
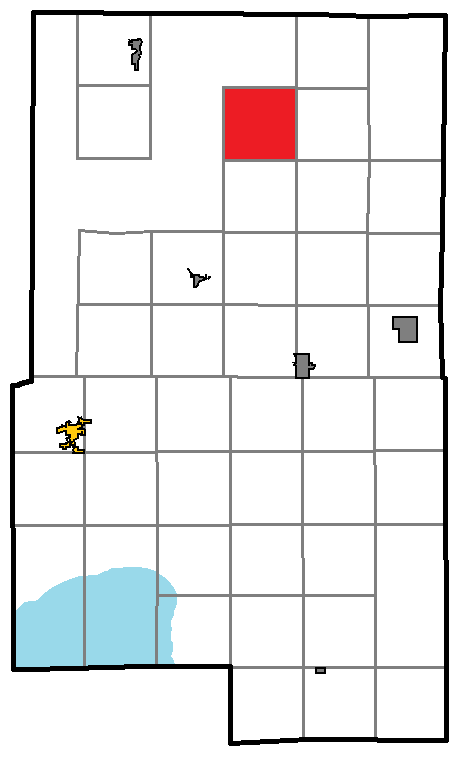
- Location of Verdon Township, within Aitkin County, Minnesota
- Coordinates: 46°52′52″N 93°21′48″W
- Country: United States
- State: Minnesota
- County: Aitkin

Area
  - Total: 36.2 sq mi (93.8 km^{2})
  - Land: 35.8 sq mi (92.6 km^{2})
  - Water: 0.46 sq mi (1.2 km^{2})
- Elevation: 1,250 ft (381 m)

Population (2020)
  - Total: 40
  - Density: 6.7/sq mi (2.59/km^{2})
- Time zone: UTC-6 (Central (CST))
  - Summer (DST): UTC-5 (CDT)
- ZIP code: 56469
- Area code: 218
- FIPS code: 27-66748
- GNIS feature ID: 0665856

Verdon Township is a township in Aitkin County, Minnesota, United States. The population was 40 in the 2020 census.

== Etymology ==
Verdon Township was named for Verdon Wells, son of the town's postmaster, E. B. Wells.

== Geography ==
According to the United States Census Bureau, the township has a total area of 36.2 square miles (93.8 km^{2}), of which 35.8 square miles (92.6 km^{2}) is land and 0.46 square miles (1.2 km^{2}), or 1.31%, is water.

=== Major highway ===
- Minnesota State Highway 65

=== Lakes ===
- Oxbow Lake

=== Adjacent townships ===
- Ball Bluff Township (northeast)
- Cornish Township (east)
- Turner Township (southeast)
- Libby Township (south)

=== Cemeteries ===
The township contains Verdon Cemetery.

== Demographics ==
At the 2020 census, there were 40 people and 14 families residing in the township. The population density was 1.1 per square mile (0.42/km^{2}). There were 43 housing units at an average density of 1.18 per square mile (0.46/km^{2}). The racial make-up of the township was 88.37% White, 9.30% Hispanic, and 2.32% American Indian.

There were 16 households, of which none had children under the age of 18 living with them, 37.50% were married couples living together and 62.50% were non-families. 34.8% of all households were made up of individuals. The average household size was 3.0.

The median household income was not listed and 3.1% of the population living below the poverty line.
