= Libby Township, Aitkin County, Minnesota =

Township in Minnesota, United States

Libby Township
- Township
- Location in Aitkin County

- Location within the state of Minnesota
- Coordinates: 46°47′49″N 93°21′13″W
- Country: United States
- State: Minnesota
- County: Aitkin

Area
  - Total: 36.1 sq mi (93.5 km^{2})
  - Land: 34.7 sq mi (90.0 km^{2})
  - Water: 1.4 sq mi (3.5 km^{2})
- Elevation: 1,237 ft (377 m)

Population (2020)
  - Total: 43
  - Density: 1.2/sq mi (0.48/km^{2})
- Time zone: UTC-6 (Central (CST))
  - Summer (DST): UTC-5 (CDT)
- ZIP code: 56469
- Area code: 218
- FIPS code: 27-36908
- GNIS feature ID: 0664774

Libby Township is a township in Aitkin County, Minnesota, United States. The population was 43 as of the 2020 census.

== History ==
Libby Township was named for Mark Libby, a fur trader in the 19th century.

== Geography ==
According to the United States Census Bureau, the township has a total area of 36.1 square miles (93.5 km^{2}), of which 34.7 square miles (90.0 km^{2}) is land and 1.4 square miles (3.5 km^{2}), or 3.76%, is water.

=== Major highway ===
- Minnesota State Highway 65

=== Lakes ===
- Aitkin Lake (west edge)
- Big Sandy Lake (west edge)
- Brown Lake (northwest quarter)
- Libby Lake

=== Adjacent townships ===
- Verdon Township (north)
- Cornish Township (northeast)
- Turner Township (east)
- Shamrock Township (southeast)
- Workman Township (south)
- Logan Township (southwest)

== Demographics ==
As of the census of 2000, there were 47 people, 25 households, and 15 families residing in the township. The population density was 1.4 inhabitants per square mile (0.54/km^{2}). There were 85 housing units at an average density of 2.5 per square mile (0.97/km^{2}). The racial makeup of the township was 100.00% White.

There were 25 households, out of which 12.0% had children under the age of 18 living with them, 56.0% were married couples living together, and 40.0% were non-families. 32.0% of all households were made up of individuals, and 12.0% had someone living alone who was 65 years of age or older. The average household size was 1.88 and the average family size was 2.20.

In the township the population was spread out, with 8.5% under the age of 18, 2.1% from 18 to 24, 19.1% from 25 to 44, 40.4% from 45 to 64, and 29.8% who were 65 years of age or older. The median age was 58 years. For every 100 females, there were 95.8 males. For every 100 females age 18 and over, there were 104.8 males.

The median income for a household in the township was $23,750, and the median income for a family was $53,750. Males had a median income of $38,750 versus $23,750 for females. The per capita income for the township was $25,971. There were 12.5% of families and 21.4% of the population living below the poverty line, including 100.0% of under eighteens and 22.2% of those over 64.
