= Floodwood, Minnesota =

City in Minnesota, United States

Floodwood
- City
- City of Floodwood
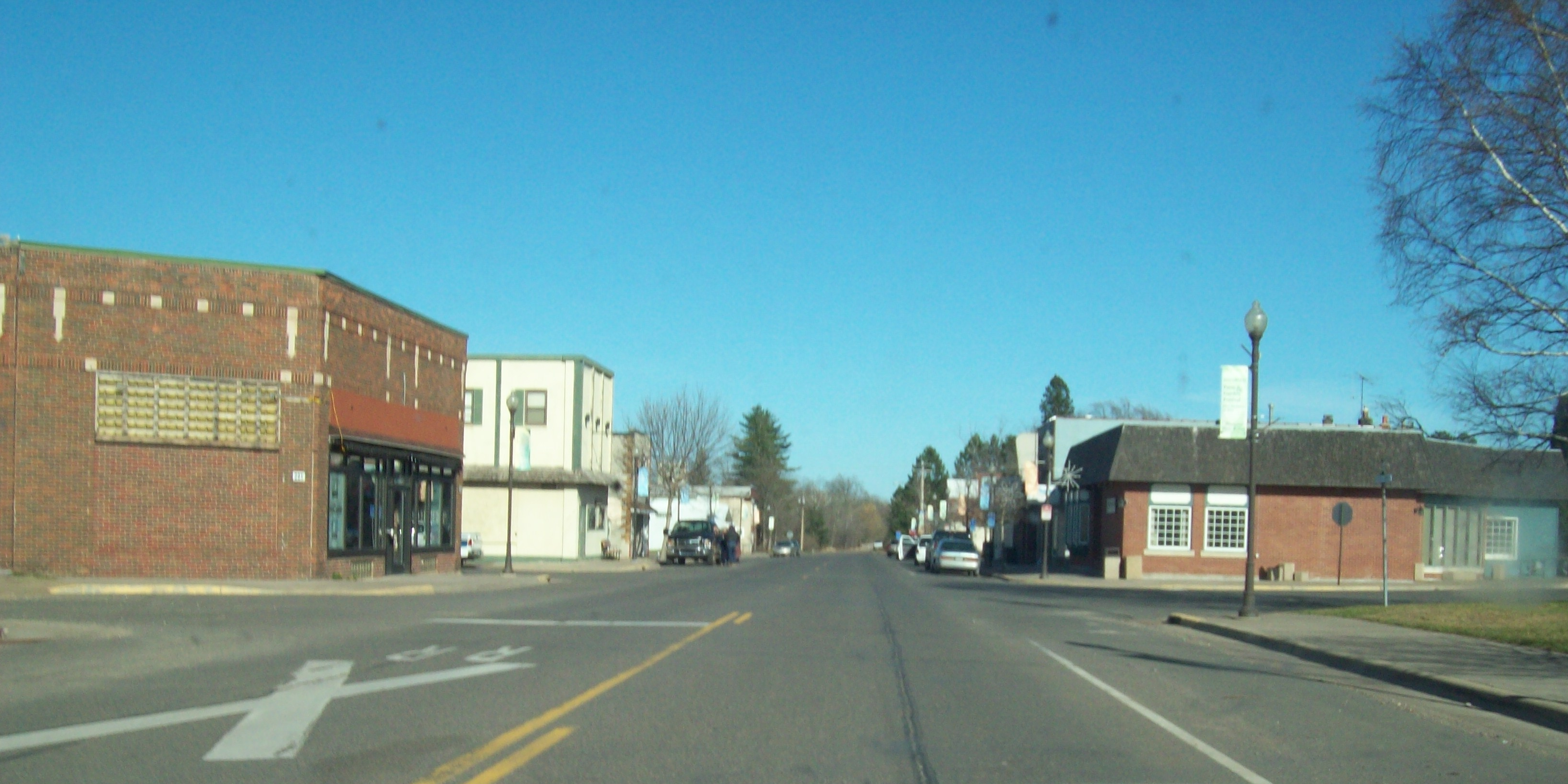
- Nickname: The Catfish Capital of the World
- Motto: A City for All Seasons
- Location of the city of Floodwood within Saint Louis County, Minnesota
- Coordinates: 46°55′37″N 92°54′57″W
- Country: United States
- State: Minnesota
- County: Saint Louis
- Incorporated: 1899

Government
  - Mayor: Tad Farrell

Area
  - Total: 1.51 sq mi (3.91 km^{2})
  - Land: 1.51 sq mi (3.91 km^{2})
  - Water: 0 sq mi (0.00 km^{2})
- Elevation: 1,250 ft (380 m)

Population (2020)
  - Total: 517
  - Density: 342.3/sq mi (132.18/km^{2})
- Time zone: UTC-6 (Central (CST))
  - Summer (DST): UTC-5 (CDT)
- ZIP code: 55736
- Area code: 218
- FIPS code: 27-21338
- GNIS feature ID: 0661287
- Website: https://floodwoodmn.gov/

Floodwood is a city in Saint Louis County, Minnesota, United States. The population was 518 as of September 2025

Originally a logging community, Floodwood was a dairy community for most of its history, but could now be best described as a bedroom community, since most of its working population finds employment in nearby Duluth, Grand Rapids, Hibbing and Cloquet. The city calls itself "The Catfish Capital of the World", a nickname it gave itself following the introduction of its annual Catfish Days festival.

U.S. Highway 2 and State Highway 73 (MN 73) are two of the main routes in Floodwood.

== History ==
Long before the city of Floodwood existed, the intersection of the East Savanna River with the Saint Louis River made what later became Floodwood a strategic economic location. The Savanna Portage was a major route for transportation in the southern Arrowhead, but its importance was magnified greatly with the arrival of European fur traders, who used the route to access rich resources of beaver and other fur animals in the upper Mississippi valley. As early as 1679, Europeans were passing by the modern location of Floodwood as they turned from the Saint Louis River to the East Savanna River on their way to the portage.

It was not until the late 19th century that homesteads began to appear in the area. In 1889, it was announced that a railroad would pass through the area. This led to a local population boom in anticipation of the opportunities the railroad would bring. In 1890, J. C. Campbell began large-scale logging operations in the area, and the C. N. Nelson Lumber Company of Cloquet built a logging railroad in the area (the logging railroad operated only in the winter; in the summer, the logging operations used the Saint Louis River to transport timber to mills in Cloquet).

In 1893, the year that local government was first organized, the first Floodwood School building was constructed of logs. The next year, the Nelson Company was purchased by what six years later became the Weyerhaeuser Timber Company, continuing the intensification of logging activities in the area. The community continued to grow and was finally incorporated in 1899.

By the time the 1900 United States census was conducted, Floodwood had a population of 224, which, within the next 10 years, more than doubled to 481. In 1911, the Floodwood School, which had previously been a county school, became Independent School District No. 19 (after 1958, Independent School District 698), and a new six-room brick building was built for it. The community continued to grow until the 1918 Cloquet Fire nearly ended the city's history.

Like most of its neighbors, Floodwood survived the fire and began a slow recovery. But the practical importance of the rivers, Floodwood's greatest economic resource, ended. By 1926, the era of large-scale timber operations in the area had come to a close. With the logging operations gone, Floodwood's survival was again in peril.

The solution had already been present since 1911: as the surrounding areas had pastures suitable for supporting dairy cattle, the community's economy turned to dairy production. In 1911, the Floodwood Creamery Cooperative was organized. The creamery became the main support of the local economy, selling dairy products across the world until it closed in the late 1960s. Dairy cattle are still a major part of the local economy.

The 1970 census showed, for the first time since 1920, that Floodwood's population had decreased. This began a trend that has endured to the present: the last time a census showed an increase in Floodwood's population was in 1960.

== Geography ==
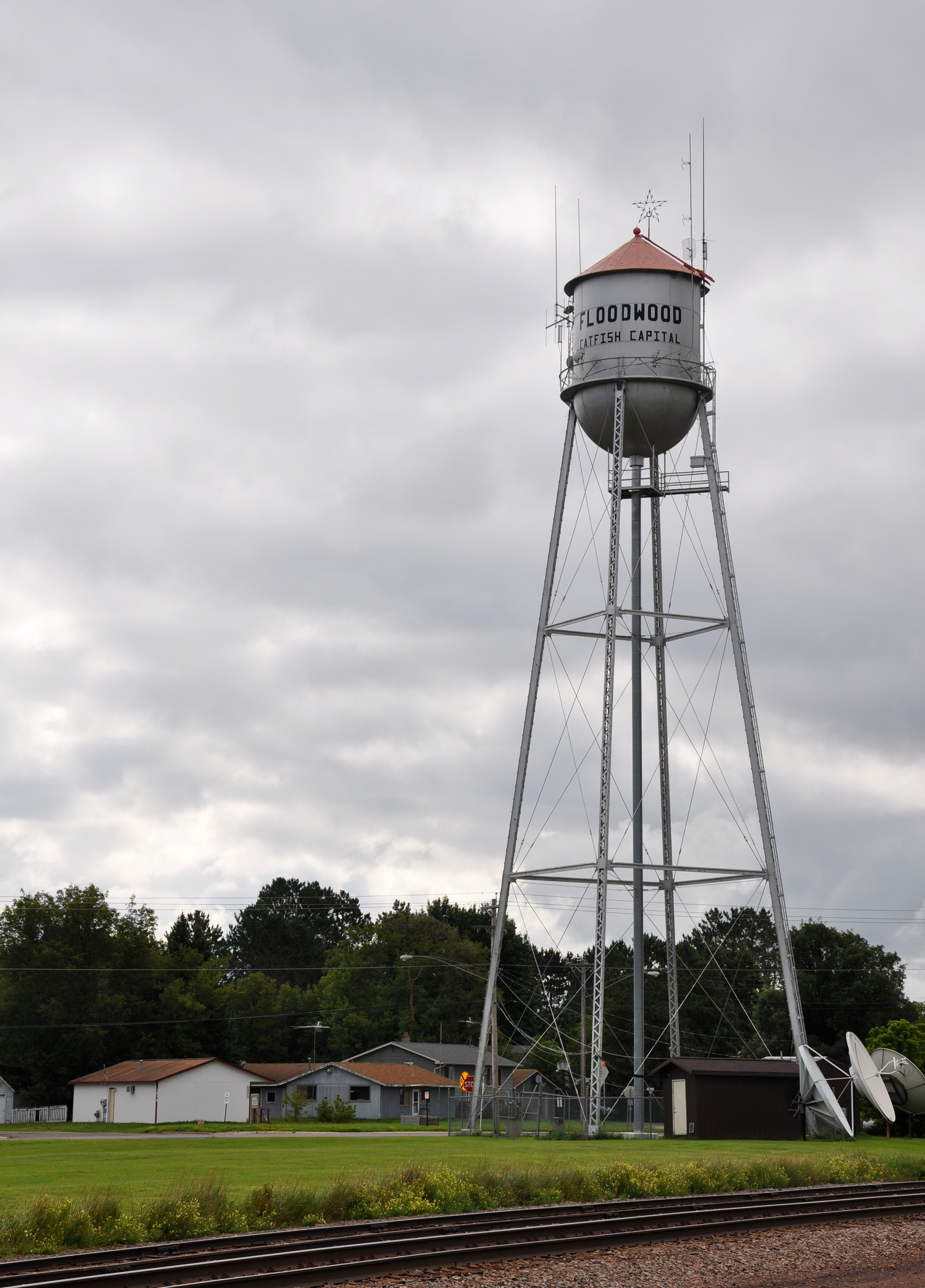
Floodwood water tower

According to the United States Census Bureau, the city has an area of 1.42 square miles (3.68 km^{2}), all land.

Floodwood sits at the junction of U.S. Highway 2 and Minnesota State Highway 73. It is roughly halfway between Duluth and Grand Rapids along U.S. Highway 2 and roughly halfway between Hibbing and Moose Lake along State Highway 73. Also nearby is the city of Cloquet.

Floodwood is 46 miles (74 km) northwest of Duluth and 37 miles (60 km) southeast of Grand Rapids. It is 33 miles (53 km) northwest of Cloquet and 40 miles (64 km) south of Hibbing.

The city sits at the junctions of the Floodwood River and the East Savanna River with the Saint Louis River. The area surrounding the city largely comprises forests, wetlands and, where conditions permit, dairy farms. Nearby peat bogs employ many people from Floodwood, Meadowlands and other communities in southwest Saint Louis County. Protected areas near Floodwood include Savanna Portage State Park, the Savanna State Forest, and the Floodwood Game Reserve. The Savanna Portage, together with the three rivers that meet in the city, contributes much to local culture.

== Climate ==
According to the Köppen Climate Classification system, Floodwood has a warm-summer humid continental climate, abbreviated "Dfb" on climate maps. The hottest temperature recorded in Floodwood was 99 °F (37.2 °C) on July 27, 1988, while the coldest temperature recorded was −50 °F (−45.6 °C) on January 20, 1996.

Climate data for Floodwood, Minnesota, 1991–2020 normals, extremes 1903–present
Month	Jan	Feb	Mar	Apr	May	Jun	Jul	Aug	Sep	Oct	Nov	Dec	Year
Record high °F (°C)	51 (11)	57 (14)	77 (25)	86 (30)	89 (32)	93 (34)	99 (37)	97 (36)	95 (35)	87 (31)	74 (23)	53 (12)	99 (37)
Mean maximum °F (°C)	38.2 (3.4)	44.4 (6.9)	58.1 (14.5)	72.1 (22.3)	82.5 (28.1)	86.5 (30.3)	87.9 (31.1)	86.5 (30.3)	82.2 (27.9)	75.0 (23.9)	55.9 (13.3)	41.2 (5.1)	89.5 (31.9)
Mean daily maximum °F (°C)	17.9 (−7.8)	23.7 (−4.6)	36.3 (2.4)	50.1 (10.1)	63.7 (17.6)	72.5 (22.5)	77.1 (25.1)	75.5 (24.2)	67.0 (19.4)	52.5 (11.4)	36.0 (2.2)	23.1 (−4.9)	49.6 (9.8)
Daily mean °F (°C)	7.1 (−13.8)	11.4 (−11.4)	24.6 (−4.1)	38.4 (3.6)	51.1 (10.6)	60.4 (15.8)	65.0 (18.3)	63.4 (17.4)	55.2 (12.9)	42.2 (5.7)	27.6 (−2.4)	14.3 (−9.8)	38.4 (3.6)
Mean daily minimum °F (°C)	−3.7 (−19.8)	−0.8 (−18.2)	13.0 (−10.6)	26.8 (−2.9)	38.6 (3.7)	48.3 (9.1)	53.0 (11.7)	51.2 (10.7)	43.5 (6.4)	31.9 (−0.1)	19.2 (−7.1)	5.5 (−14.7)	27.2 (−2.6)
Mean minimum °F (°C)	−30.2 (−34.6)	−24.9 (−31.6)	−14.8 (−26.0)	11.5 (−11.4)	24.2 (−4.3)	32.9 (0.5)	40.0 (4.4)	38.3 (3.5)	27.6 (−2.4)	17.6 (−8.0)	−1.8 (−18.8)	−21.4 (−29.7)	−33.1 (−36.2)
Record low °F (°C)	−50 (−46)	−43 (−42)	−35 (−37)	−4 (−20)	15 (−9)	25 (−4)	35 (2)	30 (−1)	20 (−7)	6 (−14)	−17 (−27)	−40 (−40)	−50 (−46)
Average precipitation inches (mm)	0.63 (16)	0.66 (17)	1.15 (29)	2.29 (58)	2.93 (74)	4.92 (125)	3.89 (99)	3.17 (81)	3.50 (89)	2.78 (71)	1.24 (31)	0.99 (25)	28.15 (715)
Average snowfall inches (cm)	10.5 (27)	8.5 (22)	6.8 (17)	6.6 (17)	0.2 (0.51)	0.0 (0.0)	0.0 (0.0)	0.0 (0.0)	0.0 (0.0)	2.3 (5.8)	8.0 (20)	13.5 (34)	56.4 (143.31)
Average extreme snow depth inches (cm)	13.2 (34)	15.8 (40)	14.5 (37)	6.6 (17)	0.2 (0.51)	0.0 (0.0)	0.0 (0.0)	0.0 (0.0)	0.0 (0.0)	1.4 (3.6)	5.4 (14)	8.8 (22)	18.1 (46)
Average precipitation days (≥ 0.01 in)	6.1	4.8	5.9	7.4	10.6	11.8	11.1	8.6	9.3	9.5	6.4	7.3	98.8
Average snowy days (≥ 0.1 in)	6.7	5.2	4.0	2.7	0.2	0.0	0.0	0.0	0.0	0.9	4.0	7.2	30.9
Source 1: NOAA
Source 2: National Weather Service

== Demographics ==
Historical population
Census	Pop.	Note	%±
1900	224		—
1910	481		114.7%
1920	277		−42.4%
1930	343		23.8%
1940	571		66.5%
1950	667		16.8%
1960	677		1.5%
1970	650		−4.0%
1980	648		−0.3%
1990	574		−11.4%
2000	503		−12.4%
2010	528		5.0%
2020	517		−2.1%
U.S. Decennial Census

=== 2010 census ===
As of the census of 2010, there were 528 people, 257 households, and 118 families living in the city. The population density was 371.8 inhabitants per square mile (143.6/km^{2}). There were 292 housing units at an average density of 205.6 per square mile (79.4/km^{2}). The racial makeup of the city was 93.9% White, 0.8% African American, 0.6% Native American, 0.4% from other races, and 4.4% from two or more races. Hispanic or Latino of any race were 1.1% of the population.

There were 257 households, of which 23.7% had children under the age of 18 living with them, 30.0% were married couples living together, 10.5% had a female householder with no husband present, 5.4% had a male householder with no wife present, and 54.1% were non-families. 47.5% of all households were made up of individuals, and 21.4% had someone living alone who was 65 years of age or older. The average household size was 2.03 and the average family size was 2.92.

The median age in the city was 40.9 years. 21.4% of residents were under the age of 18; 9.3% were between the ages of 18 and 24; 24.8% were from 25 to 44; 24.5% were from 45 to 64; and 20.1% were 65 years of age or older. The gender makeup of the city was 50.4% male and 49.6% female.

=== 2000 census ===
As of the census of 2000, there were 503 people (as of 2009, it was estimated to have 530), 254 households, and 112 families living in the city. The population density was 1,131.9 inhabitants per square mile (437.0/km^{2}). There were 290 housing units at an average density of 652.6 per square mile (252.0/km^{2}). The racial makeup of the city was 97.22% White, 0.99% Native American, 0.20% Asian, and 1.59% from two or more races. Hispanic or Latino of any race were 0.80% of the population. 48.5% were of Finnish, 18.5% German, 6.5% Swedish and 5.9% Polish ancestry.

There were 254 households, out of which 22.0% had children under the age of 18 living with them, 28.7% were married couples living together, 9.8% had a female householder with no husband present, and 55.9% were non-families. 49.2% of all households were made up of individuals, and 26.0% had someone living alone who was 65 years of age or older. The average household size was 1.98 and the average family size was 2.88.

In the city, the population was spread out, with 23.7% under the age of 18, 8.9% from 18 to 24, 26.0% from 25 to 44, 16.9% from 45 to 64, and 24.5% who were 65 years of age or older. The median age was 39 years. For every 100 females, there were 91.3 males. For every 100 females age 18 and over, there were 89.2 males.

The median income for a household in the city was $18,977, and the median income for a family was $30,833. Males had a median income of $30,179 versus $19,375 for females. The per capita income for the city was $14,649. About 12.0% of families and 19.4% of the population were below the poverty line, including 17.9% of those under age 18 and 25.4% of those age 65 or over.

== Government ==
Floodwood has a mayor-council government and operates under the provisions of state statutes concerning city government (which is true of every Minnesota city that has no home-rule charter). The mayor is Tad Farell, who presides over meetings of the city council. The position of City Administrator, created in 2002 to handle the day-to-day operations of the city's administration, is held by Jess Rich.

In May 2009, when city leaders from throughout Minnesota made the trek to the State Capitol, Mayor Kletscher made statewide news when he said: "My toolbox is empty. We've been facing this for years. We're a very poor city and we can't afford to see tax rates go up." City leaders were arguing against cuts to state funding for communities in Governor Tim Pawlenty's budget cuts. Kletscher, among others, argued that smaller communities did not have things like libraries that they could close to save funds and that the only way they could continue to function in the face of cuts in state funding would be to raise property taxes, which they did not want to do because residents of these communities are often poor, and they feared the burden would be too much for them to handle.

== Notable people ==
- Joe Polo — American curler in the 2006 Winter Olympics and 2018 Winter Olympics gold medalist, spent some of his early childhood years in Floodwood
- John Raymond Ylitalo — diplomat and 29th United States Ambassador to Paraguay, born in Floodwood

== See also ==
- Savanna Portage State Park
- Saint Louis River
- Floodwood River
- East Savanna River
