= Kimberly Township, Aitkin County, Minnesota =

Township in Minnesota, United States

Kimberly Township
- Township
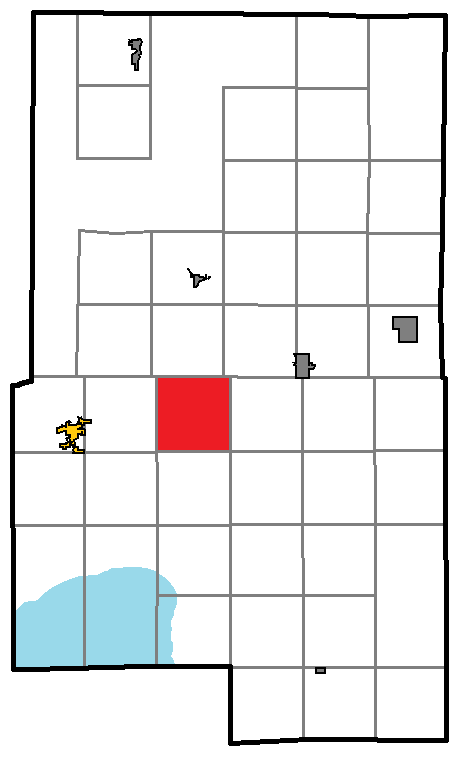
- Location of Kimberly Township, within Aitkin County, Minnesota
- Coordinates: 46°32′59″N 93°29′30″W
- Country: United States
- State: Minnesota
- County: Aitkin

Area
  - Total: 36.9 sq mi (95.7 km^{2})
  - Land: 35.9 sq mi (93.0 km^{2})
  - Water: 1.0 sq mi (2.7 km^{2})
- Elevation: 1,230 ft (375 m)

Population (2020)
  - Total: 188
  - Density: 5.24/sq mi (2.02/km^{2})
- Time zone: UTC-6 (Central (CST))
  - Summer (DST): UTC-5 (CDT)
- FIPS code: 27-33218
- GNIS feature ID: 0664633

Kimberly Township is a township in Aitkin County, Minnesota, United States. The population was 188 as of the 2020 census.

== History ==
Kimberly Township was named for Moses C. Kimberly, an official of the Northern Pacific Railway.

== Geography ==
According to the United States Census Bureau, the township has a total area of 36.9 square miles (95.7 km^{2}), of which 35.9 square miles (93.0 km^{2}) is land and 1.0 square mile (2.7 km^{2}), or 2.82%, is water.

=== Lakes ===
- Camp Lake
- Dam Lake (northwest three-quarters)
- Newstrom Lake

=== Adjacent townships ===
- Fleming Township (north)
- Jevne Township (northeast)
- Lee Township (southeast)
- Glen Township (south)
- Nordland Township (southwest)
- Spencer Township (west)

=== Cemeteries ===
The township contains the following cemeteries: Anderson, Forest and Howard Private.

== Demographics ==
As of the census of 2000, there were 245 people, 97 households, and 73 families residing in the township. The population density was 6.8 inhabitants per square mile (2.6/km^{2}). There were 177 housing units at an average density of 4.9 per square mile (1.9/km^{2}). The racial makeup of the township was 100.00% White.

There were 97 households, out of which 27.8% had children under the age of 18 living with them, 68.0% were married couples living together, 2.1% had a female householder with no husband present, and 24.7% were non-families. 21.6% of all households were made up of individuals, and 9.3% had someone living alone who was 65 years of age or older. The average household size was 2.53 and the average family size was 2.92.

In the township the population was spread out, with 23.7% under the age of 18, 4.9% from 18 to 24, 20.0% from 25 to 44, 35.1% from 45 to 64, and 16.3% who were 65 years of age or older. The median age was 46 years. For every 100 females, there were 116.8 males. For every 100 females age 18 and over, there were 112.5 males.

The median income for a household in the township was $32,500, and the median income for a family was $45,625. Males had a median income of $25,357 versus $20,625 for females. The per capita income for the township was $16,161. About 10.9% of families and 15.4% of the population were below the poverty line, including 15.6% of those under the age of eighteen and 28.3% of those 65 or over.
