= Jevne Township, Aitkin County, Minnesota =

Township in Minnesota, United States

Jevne Township
- Township
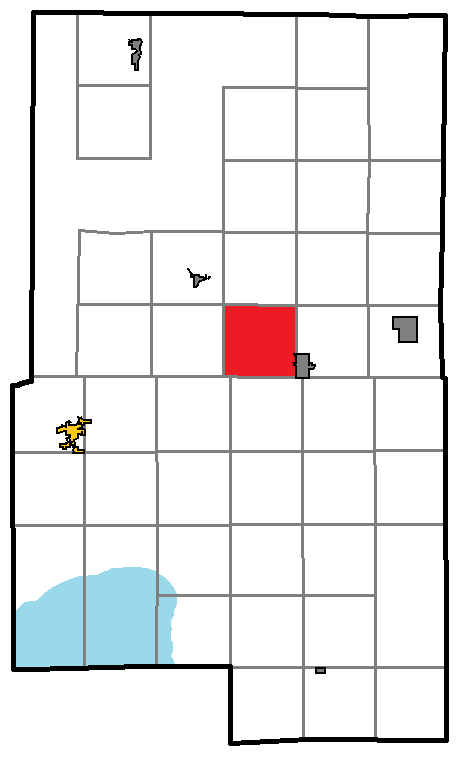
- Location of Jevne Township, within Aitkin County, Minnesota
- Coordinates: 46°38′31″N 93°22′32″W
- Country: United States
- State: Minnesota
- County: Aitkin

Area
  - Total: 35.9 sq mi (92.9 km^{2})
  - Land: 34.2 sq mi (88.6 km^{2})
  - Water: 1.6 sq mi (4.2 km^{2})
- Elevation: 1,224 ft (373 m)

Population (2020)
  - Total: 334
  - Density: 9.76/sq mi (3.77/km^{2})
- Time zone: UTC-6 (Central (CST))
  - Summer (DST): UTC-5 (CDT)
- ZIP code: 55760
- Area code: 218
- FIPS code: 27-31958
- GNIS feature ID: 0664582

Jevne Township is a township in Aitkin County, Minnesota, United States. The population was 334 as of the 2020 census.

== History ==
Jevene was the name of a pioneer family of Scandinavian settlers.

== Geography ==
According to the United States Census Bureau, the township has a total area of 35.9 square miles (92.9 km^{2}), of which 34.2 square miles (88.6 km^{2}) is land and 1.6 square miles (4.2 km^{2}), or 4.55%, is water.

A portion of the city of McGregor extends into the township but is a separate entity.

=== Major highways ===
- Minnesota State Highway 65
- Minnesota State Highway 210

=== Lakes ===
- Bass Lake
- Davis Lake
- Portage Lake (northeast quarter)
- Rock Lake
- Round Lake
- Steamboat Lake
- Town Line Lake (vast majority)
- Turner Lake

=== Adjacent townships ===
- Workman Township (north)
- Shamrock Township (northeast)
- McGregor Township (east)
- Kimberly Township (southwest)
- Fleming Township (west)
- Logan Township (northwest)

=== Cemeteries ===
The township contains Lansford Cemetery.

== Demographics ==
As of the census of 2000, there were 321 people, 131 households, and 94 families residing in the township. The population density was 9.4 inhabitants per square mile (3.6/km^{2}). There were 298 housing units at an average density of 8.7 per square mile (3.4/km^{2}). The racial makeup of the township was 98.44% White, 0.31% Native American, 0.62% Asian, and 0.62% from two or more races.

There were 131 households, out of which 29.0% had children under the age of 18 living with them, 63.4% were married couples living together, 3.8% had a female householder with no husband present, and 28.2% were non-families. 26.0% of all households were made up of individuals, and 7.6% had someone living alone who was 65 years of age or older. The average household size was 2.45 and the average family size was 2.91.

In the township the population was spread out, with 27.1% under the age of 18, 3.7% from 18 to 24, 22.4% from 25 to 44, 29.6% from 45 to 64, and 17.1% who were 65 years of age or older. The median age was 42 years. For every 100 females, there were 115.4 males. For every 100 females age 18 and over, there were 122.9 males.

The median income for a household in the township was $33,333, and the median income for a family was $41,500. Males had a median income of $31,964 versus $18,750 for females. The per capita income for the township was $15,689. About 4.8% of families and 15.9% of the population were below the poverty line, including 21.4% of those under age 18 and 13.3% of those age 65 or over.
