= Workman Township, Aitkin County, Minnesota =

Township in Minnesota, United States

Workman Township
- Township
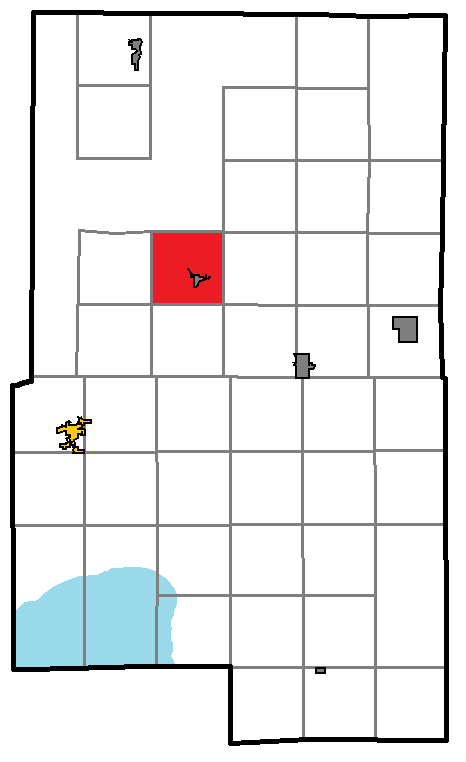
- Location of Workman Township, within Aitkin County, Minnesota
- Coordinates: 46°43′54″N 93°22′25″W
- Country: United States
- State: Minnesota
- County: Aitkin

Area
  - Total: 35.6 sq mi (92.3 km^{2})
  - Land: 32.9 sq mi (85.2 km^{2})
  - Water: 2.7 sq mi (7.1 km^{2})
- Elevation: 1,250 ft (381 m)

Population (2020)
  - Total: 212
  - Density: 6.44/sq mi (2.49/km^{2})
- Time zone: UTC-6 (Central (CST))
  - Summer (DST): UTC-5 (CDT)
- ZIP code: 56469
- Area code: 218
- FIPS code: 27-71716
- GNIS feature ID: 0666051
- Website: https://workmantownship.com/

Workman Township is a township in Aitkin County, Minnesota, United States. The population was 212 as of the 2020 census.

== Geography ==
According to the United States Census Bureau, the township has a total area of 35.6 square miles (92.3 km^{2}), of which 32.9 square miles (85.2 km^{2}) is land and 2.7 square miles (7.1 km^{2}), or 7.68%, is water.

=== Major highway ===
- Minnesota State Highway 65

=== Lakes ===
- Big Sandy Lake (west edge)
- Brown Lake (southwest three-quarters)
- Flowage Lake (west three-quarters)
- Rat Lake
- Sanders Lake
- Sandy River Lake (west half)

=== Rivers ===
- Mississippi River
- Sandy River

=== Adjacent townships ===
- Libby Township (north)
- Turner Township (northeast)
- Shamrock Township (east)
- McGregor Township (southeast)
- Jevne Township (south)
- Fleming Township (southwest)
- Logan Township (west)

=== Cemeteries ===
The township contains Lakeview Cemetery.

== Demographics ==
As of the census of 2000, there were 194 people, 90 households, and 64 families residing in the township. The population density was 5.9 inhabitants per square mile (2.3/km^{2}). There were 250 housing units at an average density of 7.6 per square mile (2.9/km^{2}). The racial makeup of the township was 95.36% White, 3.61% Native American, 0.52% Asian, and 0.52% from two or more races. Hispanic or Latino of any race were 0.52% of the population.

There were 90 households, out of which 18.9% had children under the age of 18 living with them, 65.6% were married couples living together, 5.6% had a female householder with no husband present, and 27.8% were non-families. 22.2% of all households were made up of individuals, and 10.0% had someone living alone who was 65 years of age or older. The average household size was 2.16 and the average family size was 2.48.

In the township the population was spread out, with 13.9% under the age of 18, 4.1% from 18 to 24, 21.1% from 25 to 44, 33.0% from 45 to 64, and 27.8% who were 65 years of age or older. The median age was 56 years. For every 100 females, there were 100.0 males. For every 100 females age 18 and over, there were 103.7 males.

The median income for a household in the township was $35,833, and the median income for a family was $37,083. Males had a median income of $28,750 versus $21,607 for females. The per capita income for the township was $18,518. About 6.2% of families and 6.2% of the population were below the poverty line, including 3.4% of those under the age of eighteen and 15.6% of those 65 or over.
