= Mineral River =

River in Michigan, United States

Coordinates: 46.83550°N 89.54821°W

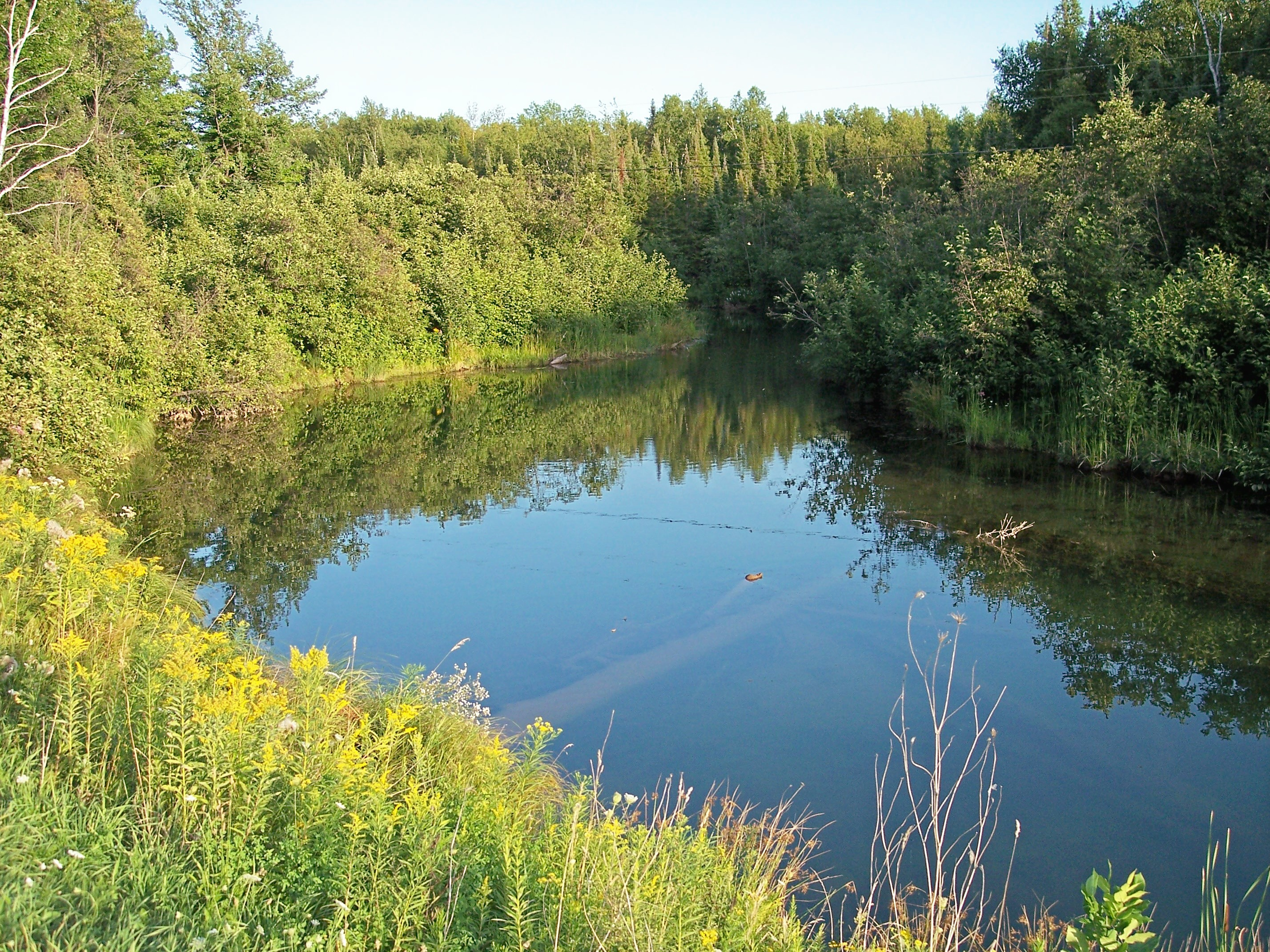
The Mineral River near its mouth at Lake Superior, as viewed upstream

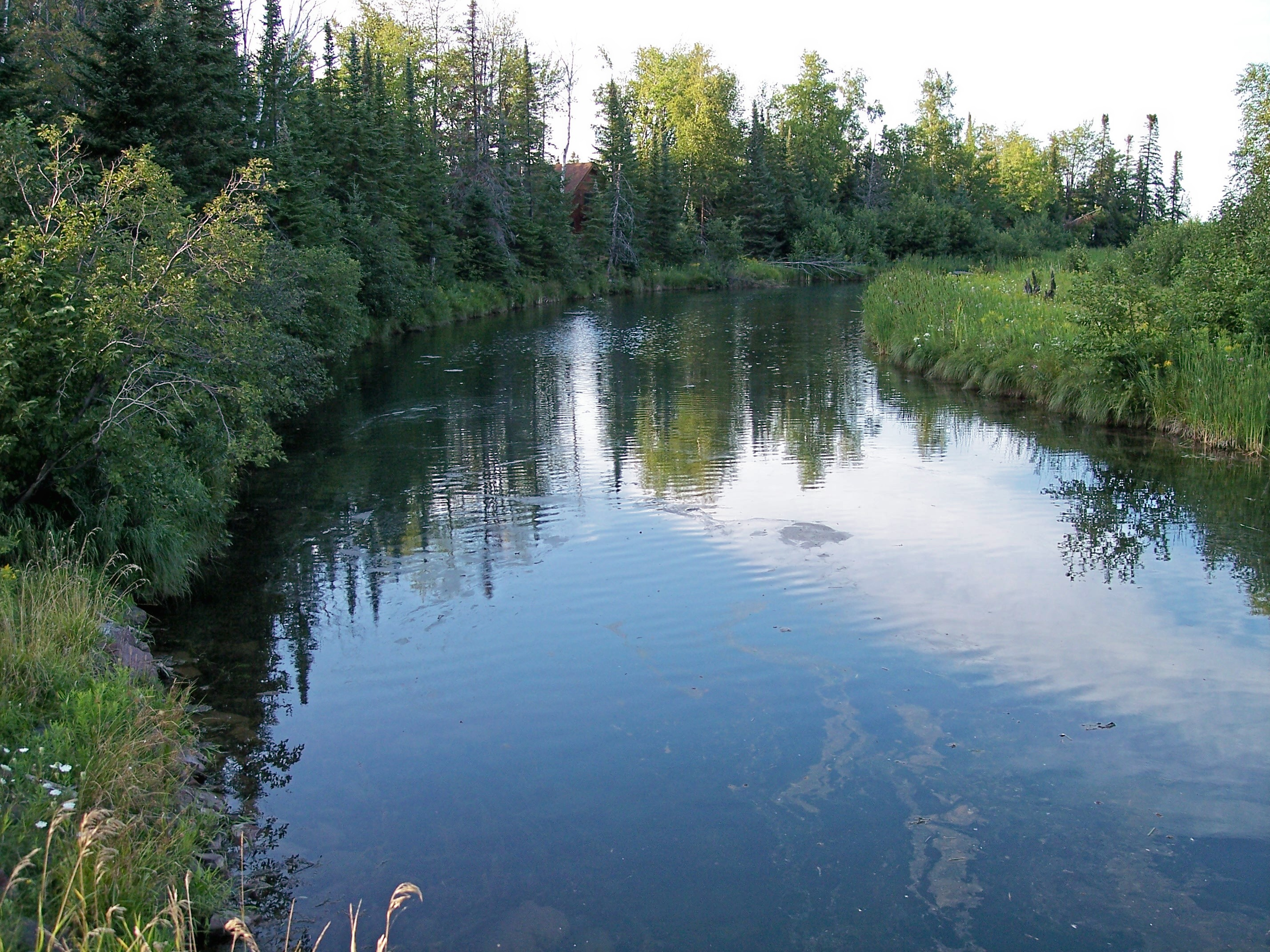
The Mineral River near its mouth at Lake Superior, as viewed downstream

The Mineral River is an 18.7-mile-long (30.1 km) tributary of Lake Superior on the western Upper Peninsula of Michigan in the United States. It flows for its entire length in western Ontonagon County, rising in the Ottawa National Forest and flowing generally northward to meet Lake Superior about 11 miles (18 km) west-southwest of Ontonagon. The United States Board on Geographic Names settled on "Mineral River" as the stream's name in 1976; according to the Geographic Names Information System it has also been known historically as "Beaver Creek".

== See also ==
- List of Michigan rivers
