= Floodwood River (Michigan) =

River in the United States of America

Location
- Country: United States

Physical characteristics
- Source
  - location: Ontonagon County
- Mouth
  - location: Lake Superior
  - elevation: 600 ft (180 m)

Floodwood River is an 11.0-mile-long (17.7 km) river in Ontonagon County in the U.S. state of Michigan.

The Floodwood River rises from the highlands of southern Ontonagon Township at and flows north into Lake Superior at approximately 4 miles (6.4 km) west of the village of Ontonagon.

The Floodwood is one of several nearly parallel streams draining the highlands of Ontonagon Township. Other nearby rivers (from west to east) include:

- Little Iron River
- Iron River
- Mineral River
- Little Cranberry River
- Cranberry River
- Floodwood River
- Potato River
