= Logan Township, Aitkin County, Minnesota =

Township in Minnesota, United States

Logan Township
- Township
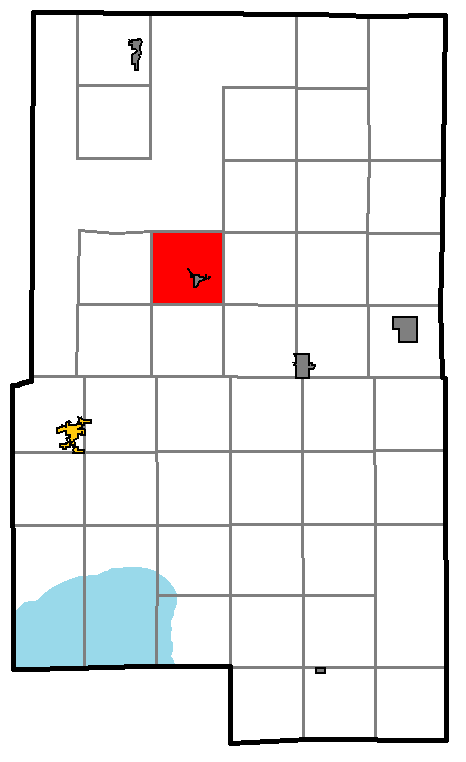
- Location of Logan Township, within Aitkin County, Minnesota
- Coordinates: 46°42′40″N 93°29′5″W
- Country: United States
- State: Minnesota
- County: Aitkin

Area
  - Total: 35.5 sq mi (92.0 km^{2})
  - Land: 35.0 sq mi (90.7 km^{2})
  - Water: 0.50 sq mi (1.3 km^{2})
- Elevation: 1,217 ft (371 m)

Population (2020)
  - Total: 185
  - Density: 5.28/sq mi (2.04/km^{2})
- Time zone: UTC-6 (Central (CST))
  - Summer (DST): UTC-5 (CDT)
- ZIP code: 56469
- Area code: 218
- FIPS code: 27-37844
- GNIS feature ID: 0664811

Logan Township is a township in Aitkin County, Minnesota, United States. The population was 185 as of the 2020 census.

== Geography ==
According to the United States Census Bureau, the township has a total area of 35.5 square miles (92.0 km^{2}), of which 35.0 square miles (90.7 km^{2}) is land and 0.50 square miles (1.3 km^{2}), or 1.39%, is water.

The city of Palisade lies within the township but is a separate entity.

=== Lakes ===
- Clear Lake
- Red Lake

=== Adjacent townships ===
- Libby Township (northeast)
- Workman Township (east)
- Jevne Township (southeast)
- Fleming Township (south)
- Morrison Township (southwest)
- Waukenabo Township (west)

=== Cemeteries ===
The township contains Pine Grove Cemetery.

== Demographics ==
As of the census of 2000, there were 231 people, 95 households, and 70 families residing in the township. The population density was 6.6 people per square mile (2.5/km^{2}). There were 174 housing units at an average density of 4.9/sq mi (1.9/km^{2}). The racial makeup of the township was 98.70% White and 1.30% African American. Hispanic or Latino of any race were 1.30% of the population.

There were 95 households, out of which 23.2% had children under the age of 18 living with them, 63.2% were married couples living together, 7.4% had a female householder with no husband present, and 25.3% were non-families. 23.2% of all households were made up of individuals, and 9.5% had someone living alone who was 65 years of age or older. The average household size was 2.43 and the average family size was 2.79.

In the township the population was spread out, with 20.3% under the age of 18, 4.8% from 18 to 24, 23.4% from 25 to 44, 30.3% from 45 to 64, and 21.2% who were 65 years of age or older. The median age was 46 years. For every 100 females, there were 102.6 males. For every 100 females age 18 and over, there were 106.7 males.

The median income for a household in the township was $34,444, and the median income for a family was $35,750. Males had a median income of $43,125 versus $25,179 for females. The per capita income for the township was $15,404. About 9.9% of families and 10.8% of the population were below the poverty line, including 14.8% of those under the age of eighteen and none of those sixty five or over.
