= Urbank, Minnesota =

City in Minnesota, United States

- City
- Location of Urbank, Minnesota
- Coordinates: 46°07′27″N 95°30′38″W
- Country: United States
- State: Minnesota
- County: Otter Tail
- Incorporated: August 16, 1947

Government
  - Mayor: Steve Nordlund

Area
  - Total: 0.661 sq mi (1.713 km^{2})
  - Land: 0.661 sq mi (1.711 km^{2})
  - Water: 0.00077 sq mi (0.002 km^{2})
- Elevation: 1,467 ft (447 m)

Population (2020)
  - Total: 52
  - Estimate (2022): 50
  - Density: 78.6/sq mi (30.36/km^{2})
- Time zone: UTC−6 (Central (CST))
  - Summer (DST): UTC−5 (CDT)
- ZIP Code: 56588
- Area code: 218
- FIPS code: 27-66388
- GNIS feature ID: 2397101
- Sales tax: 7.375%

Urbank is a city in Otter Tail County, Minnesota, United States. The population was 52 at the 2020 census.

== Geography ==
According to the United States Census Bureau, the city has a total area of 1.713 square miles (4.44 km^{2}), of which 1.711 square miles (4.43 km^{2}) is land and 0.002 square miles (0.01 km^{2}) is water.

Otter Tail County Roads 38 and 59 are the main routes in the community.

== Demographics ==
Historical population
Census	Pop.	Note	%±
1950	162		—
1960	177		9.3%
1970	125		−29.4%
1980	95		−24.0%
1990	73		−23.2%
2000	59		−19.2%
2010	54		−8.5%
2020	52		−3.7%
2022 (est.)	50		−3.8%
U.S. Decennial Census; 2020 Census

=== 2010 census ===
As of the 2010 census, there were 54 people, 27 households, and 13 families living in the city. The population density was 75.0 inhabitants per square mile (29.0/km^{2}). There were 34 housing units at an average density of 47.2 per square mile (18.2/km^{2}). The racial makeup of the city was 100.0% White.

There were 27 households, of which 18.5% had children under the age of 18 living with them, 37.0% were married couples living together, 3.7% had a female householder with no husband present, 7.4% had a male householder with no wife present, and 51.9% were non-families. 51.9% of all households were made up of individuals, and 25.9% had someone living alone who was 65 years of age or older. The average household size was 2.00 and the average family size was 3.00.

The median age in the city was 40.5 years. 20.4% of residents were under the age of 18; 9.3% were between the ages of 18 and 24; 20.5% were from 25 to 44; 26% were from 45 to 64; and 24.1% were 65 years of age or older. The gender makeup of the city was 55.6% male and 44.4% female.

=== 2000 census ===
As of the 2000 census, there were 59 people, 32 households, and 16 families living in the city. The population density was 80.7 inhabitants per square mile (31.2/km^{2}). There were 33 housing units at an average density of 45.1 per square mile (17.4/km^{2}). The racial makeup of the city was 100.00% White.

There were 32 households, out of which 21.9% had children under the age of 18 living with them, 43.8% were married couples living together, 3.1% had a female householder with no husband present, and 46.9% were non-families. 46.9% of all households were made up of individuals, and 25.0% had someone living alone who was 65 years of age or older. The average household size was 1.84 and the average family size was 2.59.

In the city, the population was spread out, with 15.3% under the age of 18, 10.2% from 18 to 24, 22.0% from 25 to 44, 28.8% from 45 to 64, and 23.7% who were 65 years of age or older. The median age was 48 years. For every 100 females, there were 103.4 males. For every 100 females age 18 and over, there were 108.3 males.

The median income for a household in the city was $40,625, and the median income for a family was $46,458. Males had a median income of $31,250 versus $12,083 for females. The per capita income for the city was $15,105. There were no families and 7.3% of the population living below the poverty line, including no under eighteens and 20.0% of those over 64.
