= Turner Township, Aitkin County, Minnesota =

Township in Minnesota, United States

Turner Township
- Township
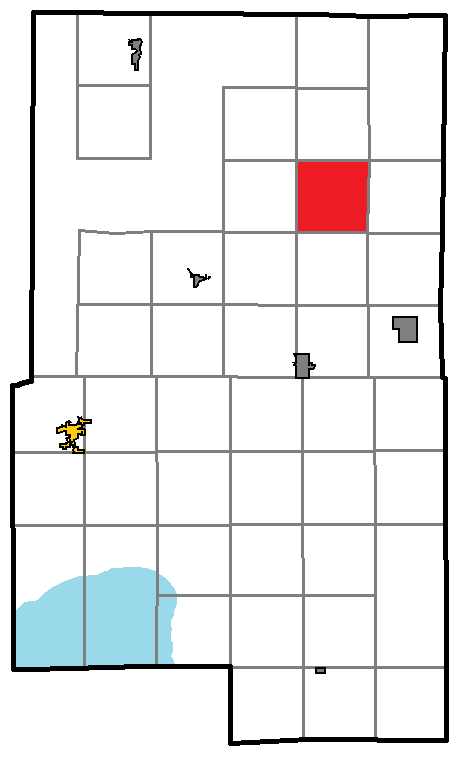
- Location of Turner Township, within Aitkin County, Minnesota
- Coordinates: 46°46′54″N 93°15′54″W
- Country: United States
- State: Minnesota
- County: Aitkin

Area
  - Total: 35.8 sq mi (92.6 km^{2})
  - Land: 30.0 sq mi (77.6 km^{2})
  - Water: 5.8 sq mi (15.0 km^{2})
- Elevation: 1,234 ft (376 m)

Population (2020)
  - Total: 137
  - Density: 4.57/sq mi (1.77/km^{2})
- Time zone: UTC-6 (Central (CST))
  - Summer (DST): UTC-5 (CDT)
- ZIP code: 55760
- Area code: 218
- FIPS code: 27-65722
- GNIS feature ID: 0665817

Turner Township is a township in Aitkin County, Minnesota, United States. The population was 137 as of the 2020 census.

== History ==
Turner Township was named for county commissioner L. E. Turner.

== Geography ==
According to the United States Census Bureau, the township has a total area of 35.8 square miles (92.6 km^{2}), of which 30.0 square miles (77.6 km^{2}) is land and 5.8 square miles (15.0 km^{2}), or 16.21%, is water.

=== Lakes ===
- Aitkin Lake (vast majority)
- Bass Lake
- Big Sandy Lake (northeast quarter)
- Glacier Lake
- Loon Lake (west three-quarters)
- Remote Lake
- Tiesen Lake
- Twin Lakes
- Wakefield Lake

=== Adjacent townships ===
- Cornish Township (north)
- Balsam Township (east)
- Haugen Township (southeast)
- Shamrock Township (south)
- Workman Township (southwest)
- Libby Township (west)
- Verdon Township (northwest)

=== Cemeteries ===
The township contains Tschibegamig Cemetery.

== Demographics ==
As of the census of 2000, there were 144 people, 74 households, and 46 families residing in the township. The population density was 4.8 people per square mile (1.9/km^{2}). There were 233 housing units at an average density of 7.8/sq mi (3.0/km^{2}). The racial makeup of the township was 86.11% White, 9.03% Native American, and 4.86% from two or more races.

There were 74 households, out of which 13.5% had children under the age of 18 living with them, 54.1% were married couples living together, 4.1% had a female householder with no husband present, and 37.8% were non-families. 32.4% of all households were made up of individuals, and 6.8% had someone living alone who was 65 years of age or older. The average household size was 1.95 and the average family size was 2.30.

In the township the population was spread out, with 13.9% under the age of 18, 0.7% from 18 to 24, 23.6% from 25 to 44, 43.8% from 45 to 64, and 18.1% who were 65 years of age or older. The median age was 52 years. For every 100 females, there were 114.9 males. For every 100 females age 18 and over, there were 106.7 males.

The median income for a household in the township was $28,333, and the median income for a family was $29,583. Males had a median income of $28,750 versus $18,750 for females. The per capita income for the township was $18,766. There were 9.3% of families and 17.5% of the population living below the poverty line, including 42.9% of under eighteens and none of those over 64.
