= Proglacial lakes of Minnesota =

Group of lakes in Minnesota, United States

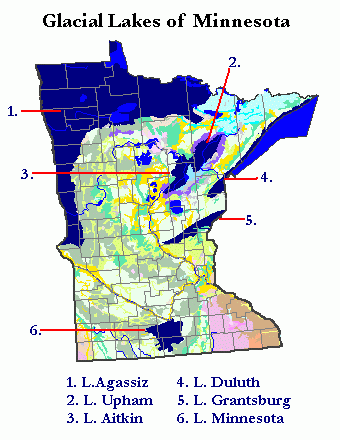
Present-day Minnesota, with proglacial lakes added in dark blue.

The proglacial lakes of Minnesota were lakes created in what is now the U.S. state of Minnesota in central North America in the waning years of the last glacial period. As the Laurentide Ice Sheet decayed at the end of the Wisconsin glaciation, lakes were created in depressions or behind moraines left by the glaciers. Evidence for these lakes is provided by low relief topography and glaciolacustrine sedimentary deposits. Not all contemporaneous, these glacial lakes drained after the retreat of the lobes of the ice sheets that blocked their outlets, or whose meltwaters fed them. There were a number of large lakes, one of which, Glacial Lake Agassiz, was the largest body of freshwater known to have existed on the North American continent; there were also dozens of smaller and more transitory lakes filled from glacial meltwater, which shrank or dried as the ice sheet retreated north.

== Glacial Lake Agassiz ==
Glacial Lake Agassiz was an enormous lake, larger in area than all the Great Lakes combined, and the largest body of fresh water ever to have existed in North America. It extended from its outlet near Browns Valley, Minnesota west into South Dakota and North Dakota and north into Saskatchewan, Manitoba, and Ontario. In Minnesota the lake occupied the Red River Valley in northwestern Minnesota and the western part of the watershed of the Rainy River in the northern part of the state. Its southern outlet was through the Traverse Gap, a spillway channel cut through the Big Stone Moraine by Glacial River Warren, an enormous stream which carved the valley of the Minnesota River as well as that of the Upper Mississippi River below the confluence of those successor streams. Lake Agassiz' present-day remnants include Lake of the Woods and Upper and Lower Red Lake.

== Glacial Lake Upham ==
Glacial Lake Upham was formed in the wake of the retreat of the St. Louis Sublobe of the Des Moines Lobe. It drained through a series of successively lower outlets to Glacial Lake Duluth. Its former lake bed is now a broad boggy area comprising much of the watershed of the latter stream.

== Glacial Lake Aitkin ==
Glacial Lake Aitkin was also a product of the recession of the St. Louis Sublobe, and for significant portions of its history was contiguous with Glacial Lake Upham. It occupied a broad lowland along the valley of the present-day Mississippi River between Grand Rapids and Aitkin in north central Minnesota. The lake bed is now a sandy and clayey plain. It is also a source for reed-sedge peat, which is harvested, processed, and packaged for agricultural applications; it enables plants to fix nitrogen and thereby reduces the need for fertilizer. The company harvesting the peat and the University of Minnesota-Duluth are developing processes to use the peat to extract mercury and other heavy metals, and also to remove sulfates from water by a method which enables the peat to be reused.

== Glacial Lake Duluth ==
Glacial Lake Duluth is the name given to the largest of a series of named lakes or lake stages occupying parts of the western Lake Superior basin. The name derives after a prominent terrace in the city of Duluth, along which Skyline Parkway was built, that was created by coastal erosion in Glacial Lake Duluth. As lower elevation outlets to the east was blocked by the Superior Lobe of the ice sheet, Lake Duluth drained through two outlets which crossed the present Laurentian Divide to the valleys of the Saint Croix River and the Mississippi. One outlet was a route from the western part of the lake through the Nemadji River basin and down the present Moose and Kettle Rivers; the other was via the modern Bois Brule River to the Saint Croix. Glacial Lake Duluth's highest level was around 1060' in the city of Duluth, but rises as high as 1350' near the border with Ontario. When the glacier retreated the lake was able to drain to the east to the Lake Michigan basin via outlets across the upper Peninsula of Michigan.

== Glacial Lake Grantsburg ==
Glacial Lake Grantsburg formed when the Grantsburg Sublobe of the Des Moines Lobe blocked southward drainage of the ice-free land to its north. It extended from St. Cloud east-northeast to Grantsburg, Wisconsin, whence its outflow ran south along the east front of the ice sheet down the valley of the Saint Croix River.

== Glacial Lake Minnesota ==
Glacial Lake Minnesota was a complex of lakes formed by or on the Des Moines Lobe generally south of Mankato, Minnesota. Evidence for it is found in lacustrine sediments in that region. The lakes may have consisted of bodies of water trapped on the surface of the decaying ice sheet, lakes created as the lobe retreated, or depressions filled from the overflow of Glacial River Warren.

== See also ==
- Geology of Minnesota
- Glacial history of Minnesota
- Laurentide Ice Sheet
- Wisconsin glaciation
