= West Savanna River =

Coordinates: 46°46′32″N 93°13′17″W

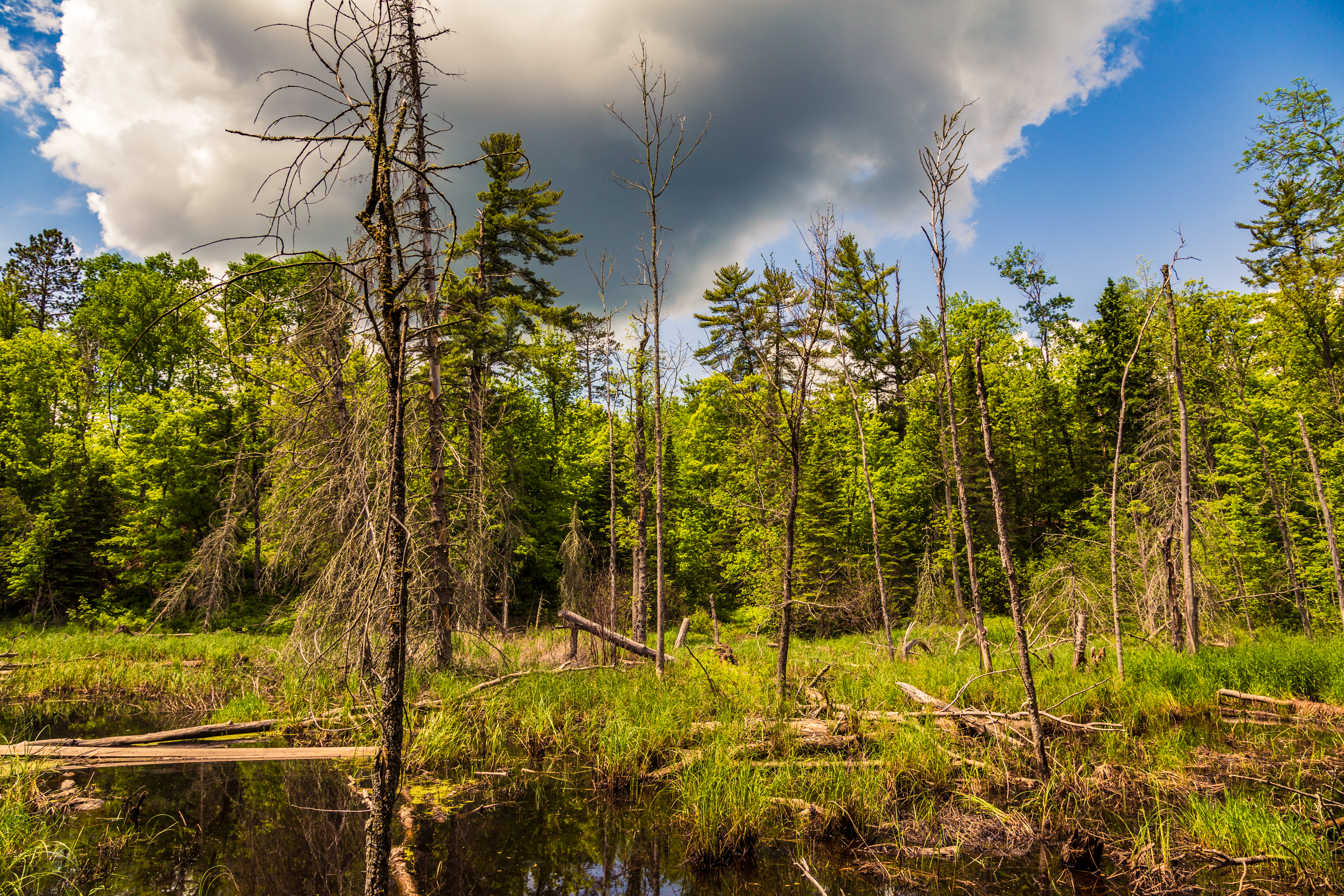

Location
- Country: United States

The West Savanna River is a river of Minnesota, United States.

== See also ==
- List of rivers of Minnesota
