= Floodwood River (Minnesota) =

Coordinates: 46.9254985°N 92.9060366°W

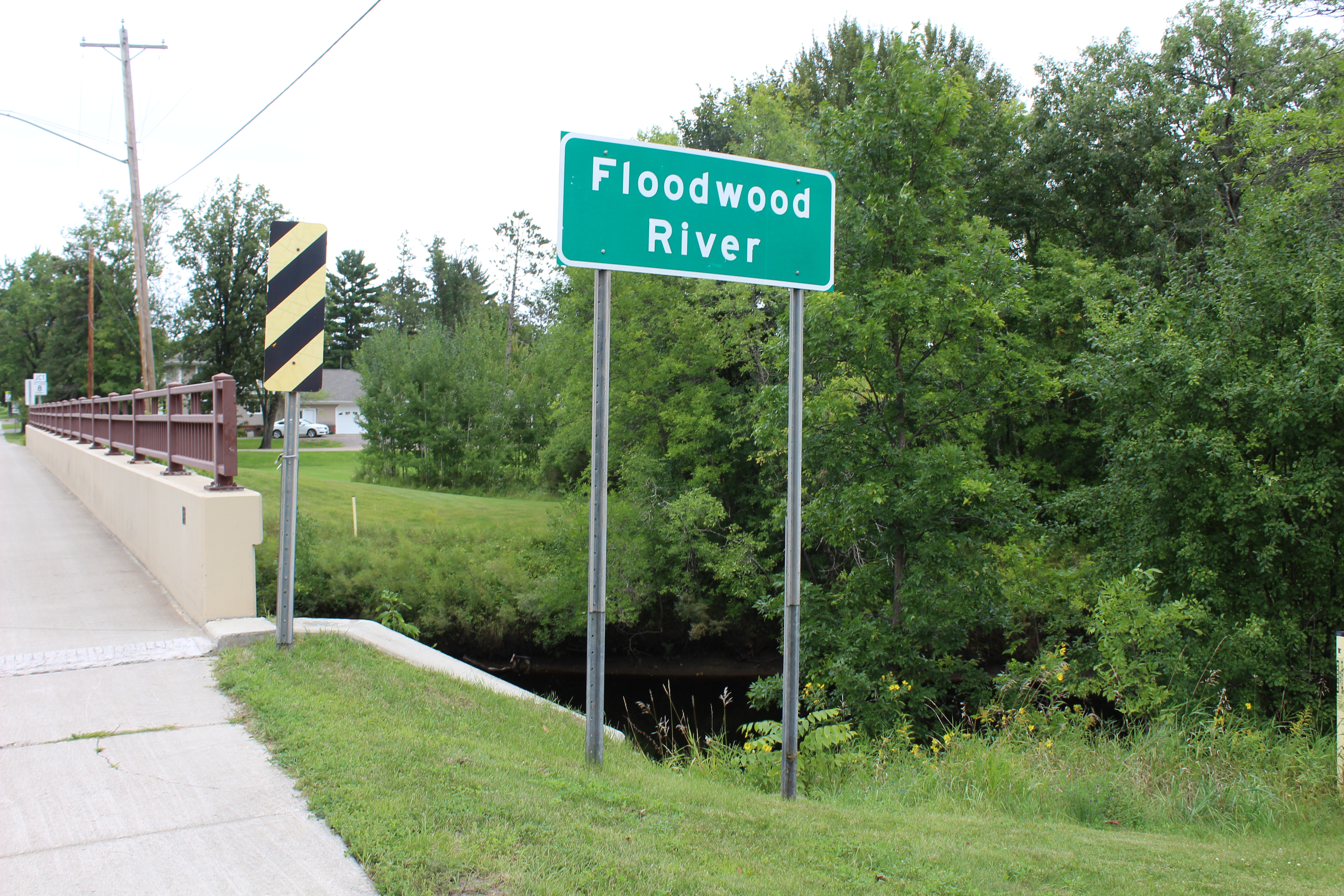
- Bridge over river in Floodwood, Minnesota

Location
- Country: United States

Physical characteristics
- Source
  - location: Minnesota
- Mouth
  - location: Saint Louis River

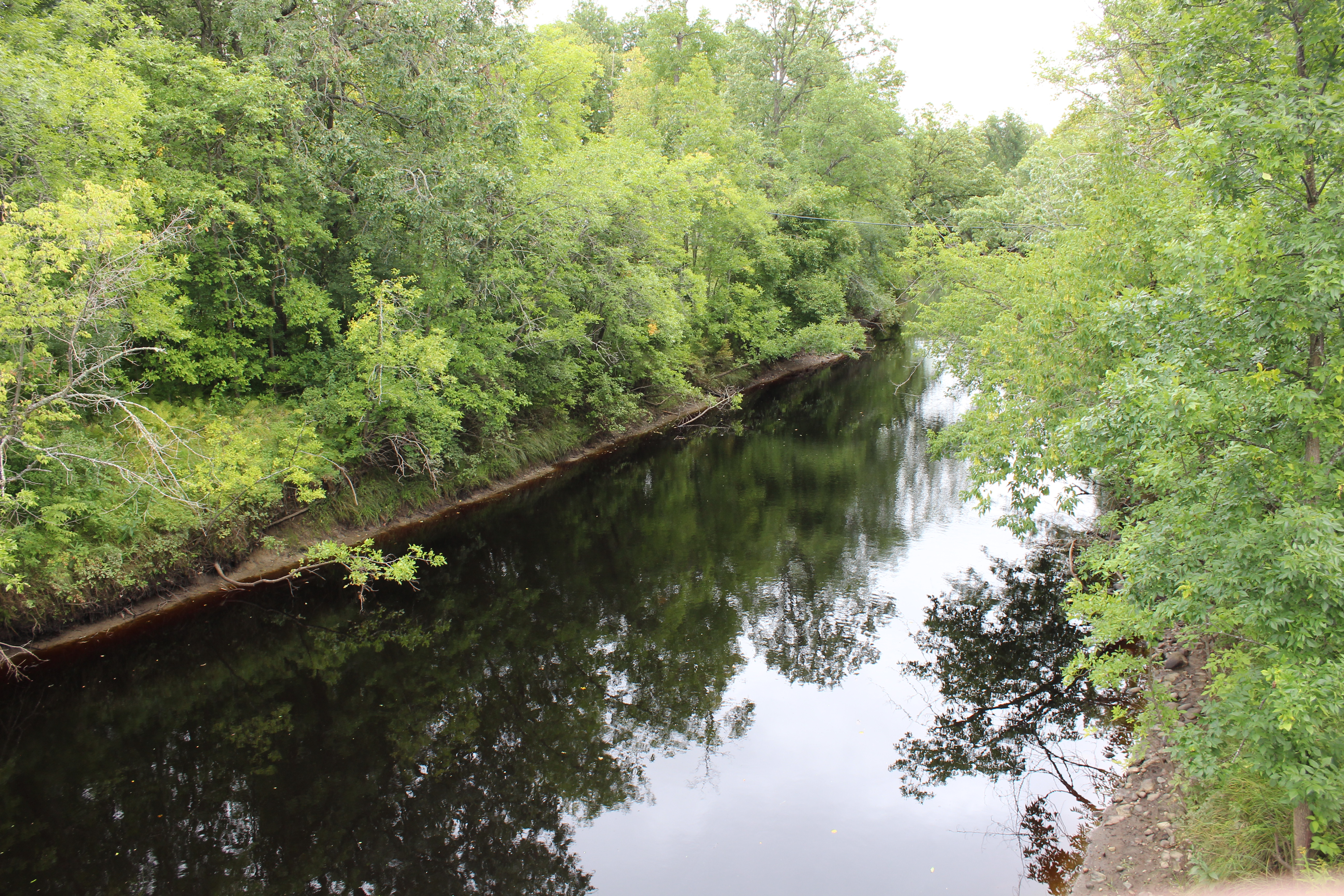
Floodwood River, Floodwood, Minnesota

The Floodwood River is a 32.1-mile-long (51.7 km) tributary of the Saint Louis River of Minnesota, United States, joining the Saint Louis at the city of Floodwood.

Floodwood River was so named on account of driftwood frequently forming dams which caused the river to flood.

== See also ==
- List of rivers of Minnesota
