= Big Sandy Lake =

Lake in Minnesota, U.S.

- Gaa-mitaawangaagamaag-zaaga'igan (Ojibwe)
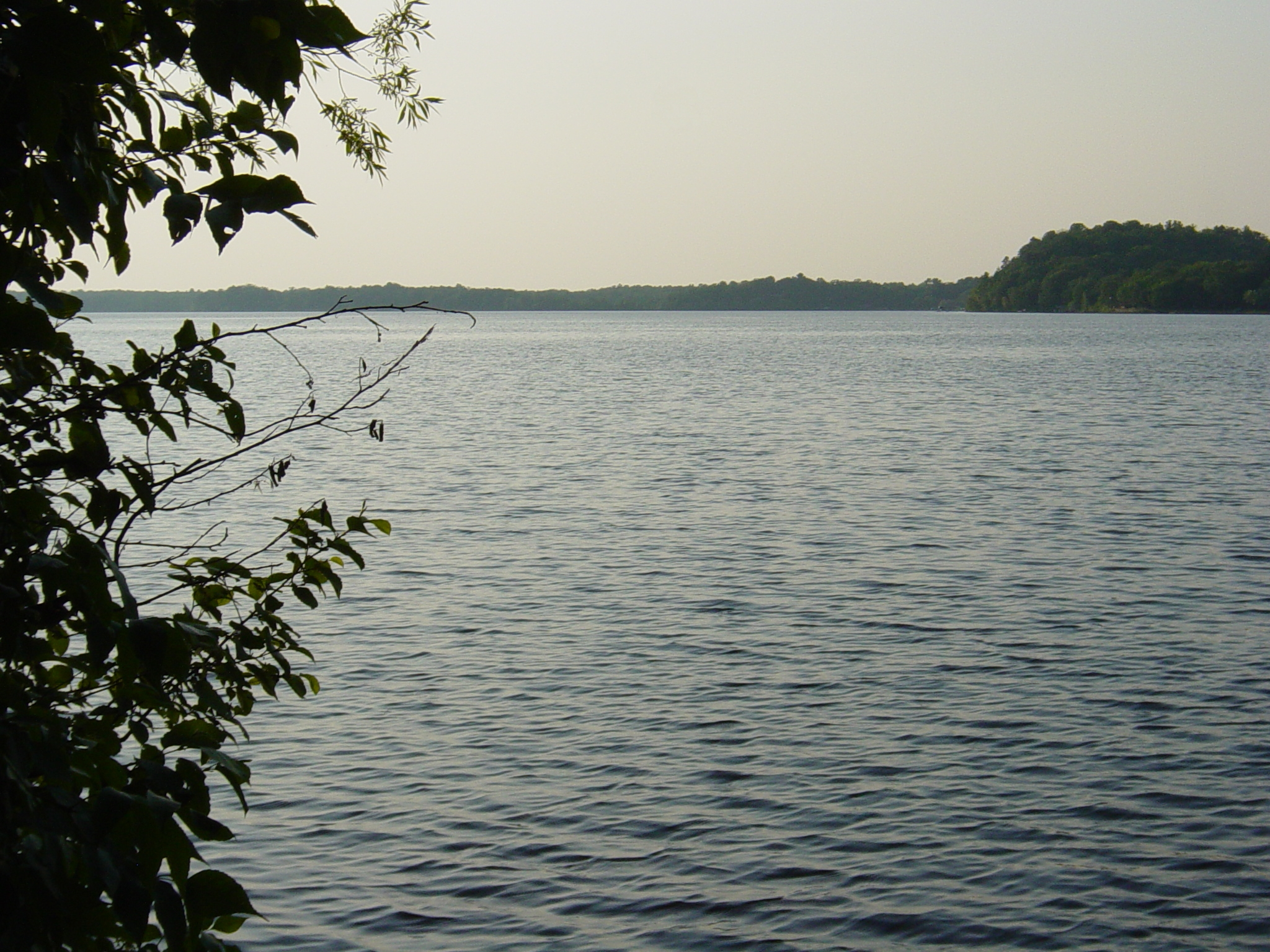
- (June 2006)

- Location within Minnesota Location within the United States
- Location: Aitkin County, Minnesota, U.S.
- Coordinates: 46°46′05″N 93°16′26″W
- Primary inflows: Sandy River, Prairie River, Aitkin River
- Primary outflows: Sandy River
- Basin countries: United States
- Surface area: 6,526 acres (2,641 ha)
- Max. depth: 84 ft (26 m)
- Water volume: 134,018 acre⋅ft (0.165309 km^{3})
- Shore length^{1}: 46.6 mi (75 km)
- Surface elevation: 1,216 ft (371 m)
- Islands: 25
- ^{1} Shore length is not a well-defined measure.

Big Sandy Lake is a lake in Aitkin County, Minnesota, approximately nine miles north of McGregor. The lake is considered fertile walleye ground with several habitat types, including the open main basin, the deep, cold eastern basin, and a shallow, more isolated south basin. Shallow bays containing dense beds of wild rice are found on south, west, and northwest sides of the lake.

Public access is provided by the Minnesota Department of Natural Resources at two locations, the first on the Sandy River north of the "Pier 65" bridge, and the second on the northeast side of the lake. Additional points of access are maintained by the Corps of Engineers and Shamrock Township.

== Features ==
Big Sandy Lake became a reservoir in 1895 when the United States Army Corps of Engineers built a dam on the Sandy River. When the dam was built it included a lock to allow boats to travel out to the Mississippi River. The lock has since been shut down and the lock house has been turned into a small museum containing local artifacts. Big Sandy Lake has three major tributaries; Sandy River, Prairie River, and Aitkin River. Sandy River enters the lake from the south and empties back into itself after the Big Sandy Dam on the northwest corner. Prairie River enters the lake from the east into Bill Horn Bay. Aitkin River enters the lake from the northwest, near the Big Sandy dam.

== Parts of the lake ==
Big Sandy Lake is known for being an intricate and complex shaped body of water. It is broken up into five main parts:

The Main Basin: Largest part of the lake on the upper half of the lake. Its extent ranges from the northeastern bay above Indian Point in Waban Bay to the western edge of the lake north of Long Island. The Main Basin connects to the Van Dusch Creek on the northern shore and Aitkin River and the dam in the northwest corner. Wide open water with consistent depth of around 20-40 feet.

Bill Horn Bay: Deepest part of the lake located on the eastern edge of the lake. Often mispronounced as Bell Horn Bay, It reaches depths of up to 84 feet. The extent of the bay is broken up into two parts, the northern half under Indian Point and the southern deeper half that goes all the way down along Long Point. The Prairie River stems off from the eastern side of the bay.

Central Bay: Located under the Main Basin and on the west edge of Long Point and east of the Long Island Area. This area contains the Anishinabe Bay and Buzzard Bay. On the north end between Anishinabe Bay and Buzzard Bay is the location of the most popular sandbar on the lake where the water gets as shallow as about a foot.

Southern Region: The southernmost extent of Big Sandy Lake contains two major bays (Goffs Bay and Davis Bay). This area is home to the Big Sandy Resort and the Sandy River. This area is generally shallower and reaches a maximum depth of about 10-15 feet.

Western Region: Fisherman's Bay and Browns Bay to the western edge of Long Island under the Main Basin. The area is also generally shallower with depths staying constant around 10-15 feet.

== History ==
Big Sandy Lake was inhabited by the Dakota Sioux until they were forcibly removed by the Ojibwe. In the Ojibwe language, the lake is known as Mitaawangaagamaa, meaning "Lake with flat, sandy beaches." The lake is home to the Sandy Lake Band of Mississippi Chippewa who are now part of the Mille Lacs Band of Ojibwe, but have been working on regaining their independent recognition by the Bureau of Indian Affairs. The Minnesota DNR also owns one island in Bill Horn Bay that they preserve. In the 1800s this was the island where the Sioux women and children hid from the attacking Ojibwe.

In 1798, North West Company maintained a post on the western side of the lake; in 1830, American Fur Company established a post at the confluence of the Sandy River with the Mississippi River, a short distance west of the lake. Originally located on the north shore of Big Sandy Lake, the village of Gaa-mitaawangaagamaag was the western terminus of the Northwest Trail that connected the Mississippi River with the Saint Louis River; Savanna Portage State Park commemorating this historic trail is located on the northeastern shore.

In 1850, the United States attempted to remove the Ojibwe population out of Michigan and Wisconsin to areas west of the Mississippi River, resulting in the Sandy Lake tragedy in which several hundred natives died of disease, starvation and exposure. A memorial commemorating the Sandy Lake tragedy was established at the United States Army Corps of Engineers Sandy Lake Dam Campgrounds. Along Minnesota State Highway 65, a rest area with a view of Sandy Lake was established, enhanced with a Historical Marker plaque to commemorate the Sandy Lake tragedy.
