= List of county roads in Aitkin County, Minnesota =

- Standard county road marker

Highway names
- Interstates: Interstate X (I-X)
- US Highways: U.S. Highway X (US X)
- State: Trunk Highway X (MN X or TH X)
- County State-Aid Highways: County State-Aid Highway X (CSAH X)
- County Roads: County Road X (CR X)

System links
- County roads of Minnesota; Aitkin County

The following is a list of county-maintained roads in Aitkin County, Minnesota, United States. Some of the routes included in this list are also county-state-aid-highways (CSAH.)

== Route list ==
Number	Length (mi)	Length (km)	Southern or western terminus	Northern or eastern terminus	Local names	Formed	Removed	Notes
CSAH 1	—	—	US 169 and MN 210 in Aitkin	CSAH 3 in Waukenabo Township		—	—	
CSAH 2	—	—	MN 18 and MN 57 in Malmo Township	Pine County line (County 41)		—	—	
CSAH 3	—	—	Crow Wing County line (County 1)	MN 65 in Shamrock Township		—	—	
CSAH 4	—	—	MN 47 in Glen Township	MN 65 in Rice River Township		—	—	
CSAH 5	—	—	MN 47 in Spencer Township	CSAH 18 in Northwest Aitkin Unorganized Territory		—	—	
CSAH 6	—	—	MN 65 in Shamrock Township	MN 210 in Tamarack		—	—	
CSAH 7	—	—	CSAH 29 in Macville Township	US 169 in Macville Township		—	—	
CSAH 8	—	—	MN 65 in Spalding Township	MN 65 and MN 210 in McGregor		—	—	
CSAH 9	—	—	MN 27 and MN 65 in McGrath	MN 27 and MN 65 in Pliny Township		—	—	
CSAH 10	—	—	US 169 in Morrison Township	Itasca County line (County 3)		—	—	
CSAH 11	—	—	Crow Wing County line (County 14)	US 169 in Hazelton Township		—	—	
CSAH 12	—	—	US 169 and MN 210 in Aitkin	MN 47 in Glen Township		—	—	
CSAH 13	—	—	MN 65 in Spalding Township	Carlton County line (County 6)		—	—	
CSAH 14	—	—	MN 65 in Shamrock Township	Lake Place in Balsam Township		—	—	
CSAH 15	—	—	Crow Wing County line (County 32)	CSAH 1 in Aitkin		—	—	
CSAH 16	—	—	CSAH 13 in Salo Township	MN 210 in Tamarack		—	—	
CSAH 17	—	—	MN 47 in Spencer Township	MN 47 in Glen Township		—	—	
CSAH 18	—	—	US 169 in Northwest Aitkin Unorganized Territory	CSAH 10 in Libby Township		—	—	
CSAH 19	—	—	Cass County line (County 58)	CSAH 29 in Macville Township		—	—	
CSAH 20	—	—	CSAH 19 in Northwest Aitkin Unorganized Territory	CR 67 in Northwest Aitkin Unorganized Territory		—	—	
CSAH 21	—	—	CSAH 1 in Spencer Township	US 169 in Morrison Township		—	—	
CSAH 22	—	—	Crow Wing County line (County 11)	CSAH 1 in Aitkin Township		—	—	
CSAH 23	—	—	MN 18 in Wagner Township	CSAH 25 in Wagner Township		—	—	
CSAH 24	—	—	CSAH 22 in Northwest Aitkin Unorganized Territory	Crow Wing County line (County 36)		—	—	
CSAH 25	—	—	Kanabec County line (County 20)	Pine County line (County 38)		—	—	
CSAH 26	—	—	CSAH 38 in Lakeside Township	CSAH 2 in Millward Township		—	—	
CSAH 27	—	—	MN 27 in Beaver Township	CSAH 13 in Salo Township		—	—	
CSAH 28	—	—	MN 210 in Aitkin Township	CSAH 12 in Nordland Township		—	—	
CSAH 29	—	—	CSAH 3 in Waukenabo Township	MN 200 in Hill Lake Township		—	—	
CSAH 30	—	—	MN 65 in Spalding Township	CSAH 16 in Salo Township		—	—	
CSAH 31	—	—	CSAH 6 in Tamarack	CSAH 32 in Haugen Township		—	—	
CSAH 32	—	—	CSAH 6 in Shamrock Township	Carlton County line (County 20)		—	—	
CSAH 34	—	—	CSAH 2 in Millward Township	Pine County line (County 46)		—	—	
CSAH 35	—	—	MN 65 in Ball Bluff Township	Itasca County line (County 72)		—	—	
CSAH 36	—	—	CSAH 14 in Turner Township	MN 65 in Libby Township		—	—	
CSAH 37	—	—	US 169 and MN 18 in Hazelton Township	US 169 in Hazelton Township		—	—	
CSAH 38	—	—	Mille Lacs County line (County 30)	CSAH 2 in Lakeside Township		—	—	
CSAH 39	—	—	CSAH 12 in Nordland Township	CSAH 12 in Norland Township		—	—	
CSAH 40	—	—	CSAH 6 in Shamrock Township	CSAH 14 in Shamrock Township		—	—	
CSAH 41	—	—	MN 210 in Aitkin	MN 210 in Aitkin		—	—	
CR 50	—	—	CSAH 5 in Spencer Township	CR 56 in Spencer Township		—	—	
CR 51	—	—	MN 18 in Wealthwood Township	CSAH 28 in Nordland Township		—	—	
CR 52	—	—	460th Lane in Haugen Township	CSAH 32 in Haugen Township		—	—	
CR 53	—	—	CSAH 4 in Glen Township	CSAH 5 in Kimberly Township		—	—	
CR 54	—	—	CSAH 1 in Aitkin	US 169 and MN 210 in Spencer Township		—	—	
CR 56	—	—	US 169 and MN 210 in Spencer Township	CSAH 2 in Millward Township		—	—	
CR 57	—	—	MN 65 in Spalding Township	MN 27 in Rice River Township		—	—	
CR 58	—	—	280th Avenue in Idun Township	CSAH 26 in Seavey Township		—	—	
CR 59	—	—	MN 18 in Idun Township	CSAH 26 in Seavey Township		—	—	
CR 60	—	—	Kanabec County line	MN 18 in Idun Township		—	—	
CR 60W	—	—	Mille Lacs County line	CR 60 in Idun Township		—	—	
CR 61	—	—	MN 27 in MN 65 in Pliny Township	CSAH 23 in Wagner Township		—	—	
CR 62	—	—	MN 210 in Jevne Township	CSAH 3 in Workman Township		—	—	
CR 63	—	—	CSAH 3 in Workman Township	MN 65 in Workman Township		—	—	
CR 64	—	—	CSAH 32 in Haugen Township	CSAH 14 in Balsam Township		—	—	
CR 65	—	—	CSAH 36 in Cornish Township	MN 65 in Ball Bluff Township		—	—	
CR 66	—	—	US 169 in Hill City	US 169 in Hill Lake Township		—	—	
CR 67	—	—	CSAH 20 in Northwest Aitkin Unorganized Territory	CSAH 29 in Hill Lake Township		—	—	
CR 68	—	—	410th Place in Northwest Aitkin Unorganized Territory	Dead End in Northwest Aitkin Unorganized Territory		—	—	
CR 69	—	—	CSAH 2 in Malmo Township	MN 47 in Malmo Township		—	—	
CR 70	—	—	MN 65 in Ball Bluff Township	MN 65 and MN 200 in Ball Bluff Township		—	—	
CR 71	—	—	CR 62 in Jevne Township	MN 65 in Jevne Township		—	—	
CR 72	—	—	MN 47 in Spencer Township	CSAH 5 in Kimberly Township		—	—	
CR 73	—	—	MN 210 in McGregor Township	CSAH 6 in Shamrock Township		—	—	
CR 74	—	—	MN 200 in Hill Lake Township	US 169 in Hill City		—	—	
CR 75	—	—	CSAH 34 in Millward Township	MN 27 in Beaver Township		—	—	
CR 76	—	—	US 169 in Farm Island Township	US 169 in Farm Island Township		—	—	
CR 77	—	—	US 169 in Hazelton Township	US 169 in Farm Island Township		—	—	
CR 77W	—	—	CSAH 11 in Hazelton Township	CR 77 in Hazelton Township		—	—	
CR 79	—	—	Elm Street in McGrath	CSAH 9 in McGrath		—	—	
CR 80	—	—	MN 18 and MN 47 in Lakeside Township	CSAH 38 in Lakeside Township		—	—	
CR 81	—	—	CSAH 28 in Nordland Township	CSAH 12 in Nordland Township		—	—	
CR 82	—	—	US 169 in Hill City	Dead End in Hill City		—	—	
CR 83	—	—	US 169 and MN 210 in Spencer Township	CR 54 in Aitkin		—	—	
CR 85	—	—	Crow Wing County line	US 169 and MN 18 in Hazelton Township		—	—	
CR 86	—	—	Dead End in Farm Island Township	US 169 in Farm Island Township		—	—	
CR 88	—	—	CSAH 5 in Fleming Township	Fox Lane in Fleming Township		—	—	
