= Dead Moose River =

River in Minnesota, U.S.

Coordinates: 46.4982792°N 92.8965951°W

The Dead Moose River is a 15.2-mile-long (24.5 km) tributary of the Kettle River in eastern Minnesota. Via the Kettle and St. Croix rivers, it is part of the watershed of the Mississippi River.

The Dead Moose River rises in Salo Township of eastern Aitkin County and flows generally eastwardly through Automba, Kalevala and Silver townships of southwestern Carlton County. It joins the Kettle River from the west about 1 mile (2 km) northwest of the town of Kettle River.

== See also ==
- List of Minnesota rivers
