= Williams Township, Aitkin County, Minnesota =

Township in Minnesota, United States

Williams Township
- Township
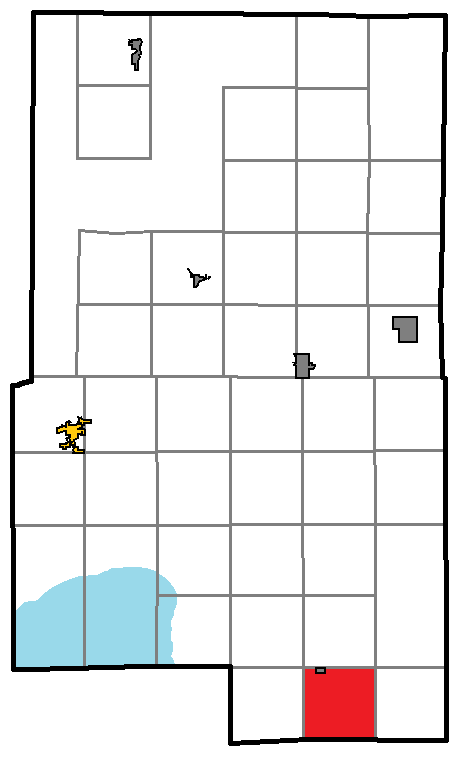
- Location of Williams Township, within Aitkin County, Minnesota
- Coordinates: 46°12′56″N 93°14′25″W
- Country: United States
- State: Minnesota
- County: Aitkin

Area
  - Total: 35.9 sq mi (92.9 km^{2})
  - Land: 35.8 sq mi (92.8 km^{2})
  - Water: 0.039 sq mi (0.1 km^{2})
- Elevation: 1,280 ft (390 m)

Population (2020)
  - Total: 120
  - Density: 3.3/sq mi (1.3/km^{2})
- Time zone: UTC-6 (Central (CST))
  - Summer (DST): UTC-5 (CDT)
- FIPS code: 27-70384
- GNIS feature ID: 0665997

Williams Township is a township in Aitkin County, Minnesota, United States. The population was 120 as of the 2020 census.

== Etymology ==
Williams Township was named for George T. Williams, who served as probate judge of Aitkin County for many years.

== Geography ==
According to the United States Census Bureau, the township has a total area of 35.9 square miles (92.9 km^{2}), of which 35.8 square miles (92.8 km^{2}) is land and 0.039 square miles (0.1 km^{2}), or 0.08%, is water.

The city of McGrath lies within the township but is a separate entity.

=== Major highways ===
- Minnesota State Highway 18
- Minnesota State Highway 27
- Minnesota State Highway 65

=== Adjacent townships ===
- Pliny Township (north)
- Millward Township (northeast)
- Wagner Township (east)
- Kroschel Township, Kanabec County (southeast)
- Ford Township, Kanabec County (south)
- Hay Brook Township, Kanabec County (southwest)
- Idun Township (west)
- Seavey Township (northwest)

=== Cemeteries ===
The township contains Grace Cemetery.

== Demographics ==
As of the census of 2000, there were 153 people, 67 households, and 42 families residing in the township. The population density was 4.3 people per square mile (1.6/km^{2}). There were 142 housing units at an average density of 4.0/sq mi (1.5/km^{2}). The racial makeup of the township was 98.69% White, 0.65% Native American and 0.65% Asian.

There were 67 households, out of which 20.9% had children under the age of 18 living with them, 52.2% were married couples living together, 4.5% had a female householder with no husband present, and 37.3% were non-families. 34.3% of all households were made up of individuals, and 13.4% had someone living alone who was 65 years of age or older. The average household size was 2.28 and the average family size was 2.90.

In the township the population was spread out, with 21.6% under the age of 18, 3.3% from 18 to 24, 27.5% from 25 to 44, 32.0% from 45 to 64, and 15.7% who were 65 years of age or older. The median age was 44 years. For every 100 females, there were 135.4 males. For every 100 females age 18 and over, there were 126.4 males.

The median income for a household in the township was $39,375, and the median income for a family was $50,893. Males had a median income of $33,750 versus $17,188 for females. The per capita income for the township was $20,566. About 16.3% of families and 22.9% of the population were below the poverty line, including 40.9% of those under the age of eighteen and none of those 65 or over.
