= Split Rock Township =

Split Rock Township may refer to:

- Split Rock Township, Carlton County, Minnesota
- Split Rock Township, Minnehaha County, South Dakota
