= Ronald, Minnesota =

Unincorporated community in Minnesota, US

Ronald
- Unincorporated community
- Location within Minnesota Location within the United States
- Coordinates: 46°26′50″N 93°03′19″W
- Country: United States
- State: Minnesota
- County: Aitkin
- Township: Beaver Township
- Elevation: 1,306 ft (398 m)
- Time zone: UTC-6 (Central (CST))
  - Summer (DST): UTC-5 (CDT)
- ZIP code: 55760 and 55783
- Area code: 218
- GNIS feature ID: 654912

Ronald is an unincorporated community in Beaver Township, Aitkin County, Minnesota, United States. The community is located along State Highway 27 (MN 27) near 100th Place. Nearby places include Kettle River, Lawler, Arthyde, and Moose Lake.

The boundary line between Aitkin and Carlton counties is nearby. ZIP codes 55760 (McGregor) and 55783 (Sturgeon Lake) meet near Ronald.

== History ==
The community had a post office from 1894 to 1926.
