= Thor, Minnesota =

Unincorporated community in Minnesota, US

Thor
- Unincorporated community
- Location within Minnesota Location within the United States
- Coordinates: 46°28′34″N 93°25′15″W
- Country: United States
- State: Minnesota
- County: Aitkin
- Township: Lee Township
- Elevation: 1,270 ft (390 m)
- Time zone: UTC-6 (Central (CST))
  - Summer (DST): UTC-5 (CDT)
- ZIP code: 56431
- Area code: 218
- GNIS feature ID: 653171

Thor is an unincorporated community in Lee Township, Aitkin County, Minnesota, United States. The community is located along Aitkin County Road 4 (Dam Lake Street) near the junction with 275th Place. Nearby places include Aitkin, Glen, East Lake, McGregor, and Rice Lake National Wildlife Refuge.
