= Lawler, Minnesota =

Unincorporated community in Minnesota, US

Lawler
- Unincorporated community
- Location within Minnesota Location within the United States
- Coordinates: 46°32′10″N 93°10′14″W
- Country: United States
- State: Minnesota
- County: Aitkin
- Township: Salo Township
- Elevation: 1,316 ft (401 m)
- Time zone: UTC-6 (Central (CST))
  - Summer (DST): UTC-5 (CDT)
- ZIP code: 55760
- Area code: 218
- GNIS feature ID: 646531

Lawler is an unincorporated community in Salo Township, Aitkin County, Minnesota, United States. The community is located near the junction of Aitkin County Roads 13, 16, and 27, Kestrel Avenue. Nearby places include McGregor, Tamarack, East Lake, Ronald, and Kettle River. Lawler is located in the east-central part of Aitkin County. Wakefield Brook flows nearby.

== History ==
The community had a post office from 1909 to 1964.

Lawler had a train depot that was served by the Soo Line. There was a Co-Op that supplied the surrounding families for groceries. Charlie and Billy Spicola founded and ran the mercantile store and gas station. Lawler had a creamery for processing milk product from local farmers. Evening entertainment included dances at the Pavilion on weekends and there was also a tavern that still functions today. An elementary school was located in town and served grades 1-8, higher education was then supplied by MacGregor High.

The Pentecostal Church was served by Reverend Matson for many years.
