= East Lake, Minnesota =

Unincorporated community in Minnesota, US

East Lake Minisinaakwaang (Ojibwe)
- Unincorporated community
- Location within Minnesota Location within the United States
- Coordinates: 46°32′18″N 93°17′01″W
- Country: United States
- State: Minnesota
- County: Aitkin
- Township: Spalding Township
- Elevation: 1,247 ft (380 m)
- Time zone: UTC-6 (Central (CST))
  - Summer (DST): UTC-5 (CDT)
- ZIP code: 55760
- Area code: 218
- GNIS feature ID: 643087

East Lake (Ojibwe: Minisinaakwaang) is an unincorporated community in Spalding Township, Aitkin County, Minnesota, United States.

State Highway 65 (MN 65) and Aitkin County Road 13 (360th Street) are two of the main routes in the community. Auto Tour Road, 363rd Lane, is nearby. The Rice River and Wakefield Brook both flow through the community. Nearby places include McGregor, Thor, Lawler, Tamarack, and Rice Lake National Wildlife Refuge.

== Geography ==
East Lake, located immediately east of Big Rice Lake, is located in section 20 of Spalding Township. The community had a post office from 1910 to 1953, operated by early settler Anthony Spicola. The community at one time was served by the Soo Line Railroad and had a railroad station and a sawmill. Today, the abandoned railroad grade has been converted into a recreational trail.

== History ==
Ojibwe peoples lived in the area for centuries. Under the 1855 Treaty of Washington (10 Stat. 1165), an Indian Reservation for the Rice Lake Band of Mississippi Chippewa was supposed to be established, but due to several lakes in the area all translated into English as "Rice Lake", the Rice Lake Indian Reservation was never platted. However, the Rice Lake Band claimed the intended "Rice Lake" was Big Rice Lake, located immediately west of the community. Because of the Big Rice Lake's prominent feature of having a groved island, the community is called in the Ojibwe language Minisinaakwaang (By the Groved Island). After the Rice Lake National Wildlife Refuge was established and forced removal of the Ojibwe peoples off the Refuge, the scattered Ojibwe population in the immediate area consolidated about the village and its train station.

== Community ==
Today, East Lake serves as the administrative center for the Mille Lacs Band of Ojibwe, District II. The community has an Assisted Living Unit, a Minnesota Charter School named Minisinaakwaang Leadership Academy, and the East Lake Convenience Store and Laundromat. ZIP code 55760 (McGregor) serves East Lake.
