= Idun Township, Aitkin County, Minnesota =

Township in Minnesota, United States

Idun Township
- Township
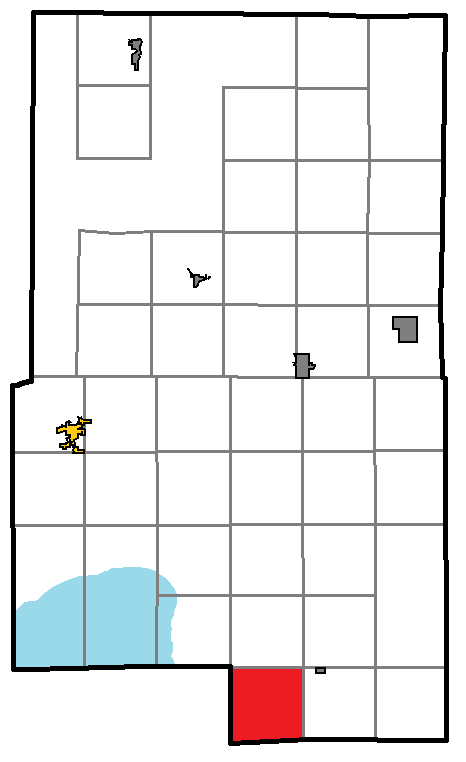
- Location of Idun Township, within Aitkin County, Minnesota
- Coordinates: 46°13′16″N 93°22′38″W
- Country: United States
- State: Minnesota
- County: Aitkin

Area
  - Total: 37.3 sq mi (96.5 km^{2})
  - Land: 36.6 sq mi (94.9 km^{2})
  - Water: 0.62 sq mi (1.6 km^{2})
- Elevation: 1,299 ft (396 m)

Population (2020)
  - Total: 222
  - Density: 6.06/sq mi (2.34/km^{2})
- Time zone: UTC-6 (Central (CST))
  - Summer (DST): UTC-5 (CDT)
- FIPS code: 27-30788
- GNIS feature ID: 0664541
- Website: https://iduntownshipmn.gov/

Idun Township is a township in Aitkin County, Minnesota, United States. The population was 222 as of the 2020 census.

== History ==
Idun Township was named for Iðunn, a god of Norse mythology.

== Geography ==
According to the United States Census Bureau, the township has a total area of 37.3 square miles (96.5 km^{2}), of which 36.6 square miles (94.9 km^{2}) is land and 0.62 square miles (1.6 km^{2}), or 1.62%, is water.

=== Major highway ===
- Minnesota State Highway 18

=== Lakes ===
- Bear Lake
- Cedar Lake

=== Adjacent townships ===
- Seavey Township (north)
- Pliny Township (northeast)
- Williams Township (east)
- Ford Township, Kanabec County (southeast)
- Hay Brook Township, Kanabec County (south)
- Isle Harbor Township, Mille Lacs County (southwest)
- East Side Township, Mille Lacs County (west)
- Lakeside Township (northwest)

=== Cemeteries ===
The township contains Redtop Cemetery.

== Demographics ==
As of the census of 2000, there were 235 people, 95 households, and 62 families residing in the township. The population density was 6.4 inhabitants per square mile (2.5/km^{2}). There were 195 housing units at an average density of 5.3 per square mile (2.0/km^{2}). The racial makeup of the township was 95.32% White, 0.43% African American, 2.98% Native American, and 1.28% from two or more races. Hispanic or Latino of any race were 2.13% of the population.

There were 95 households, out of which 25.3% had children under the age of 18 living with them, 62.1% were married couples living together, 1.1% had a female householder with no husband present, and 34.7% were non-families. 30.5% of all households were made up of individuals, and 6.3% had someone living alone who was 65 years of age or older. The average household size was 2.47 and the average family size was 3.10.

In the township the population was spread out, with 22.6% under the age of 18, 7.7% from 18 to 24, 21.3% from 25 to 44, 28.5% from 45 to 64, and 20.0% who were 65 years of age or older. The median age was 44 years. For every 100 females, there were 126.0 males. For every 100 females age 18 and over, there were 130.4 males.

The median income for a household in the township was $29,063, and the median income for a family was $40,313. Males had a median income of $38,750 versus $20,000 for females. The per capita income for the township was $15,193. About 6.8% of families and 13.3% of the population were below the poverty line, including 12.2% of those under the age of eighteen and 13.0% of those 65 or over.
