= Automba, Minnesota =

Unincorporated community in Minnesota, US

Automba
- Unincorporated community
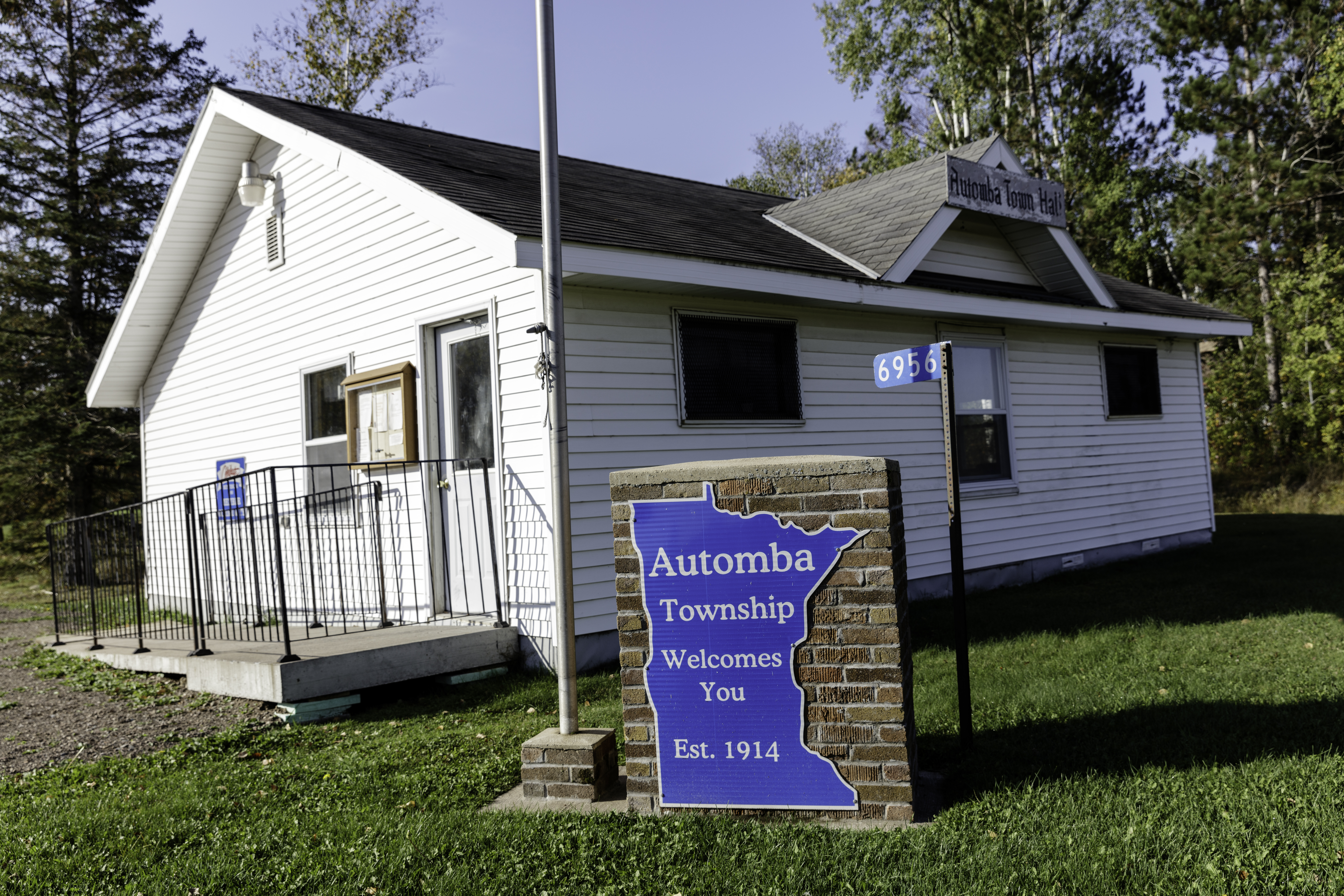
- Automba Town Hall

- Location within Minnesota
- Coordinates: 46°31′15″N 93°01′07″W
- Country: United States
- State: Minnesota
- County: Carlton County
- Township: Automba Township
- Elevation: 1,289 ft (393 m)
- ZIP code: 55757
- Area code: 218
- GNIS feature ID: 0654578

Automba is an unincorporated community in Automba Township, Carlton County, Minnesota, United States. The community is near Kettle River along Carlton County Road 6. State Highways 27 (MN 27) and 73 (MN 73) are nearby. Automba is 18 miles west-northwest of Moose Lake.

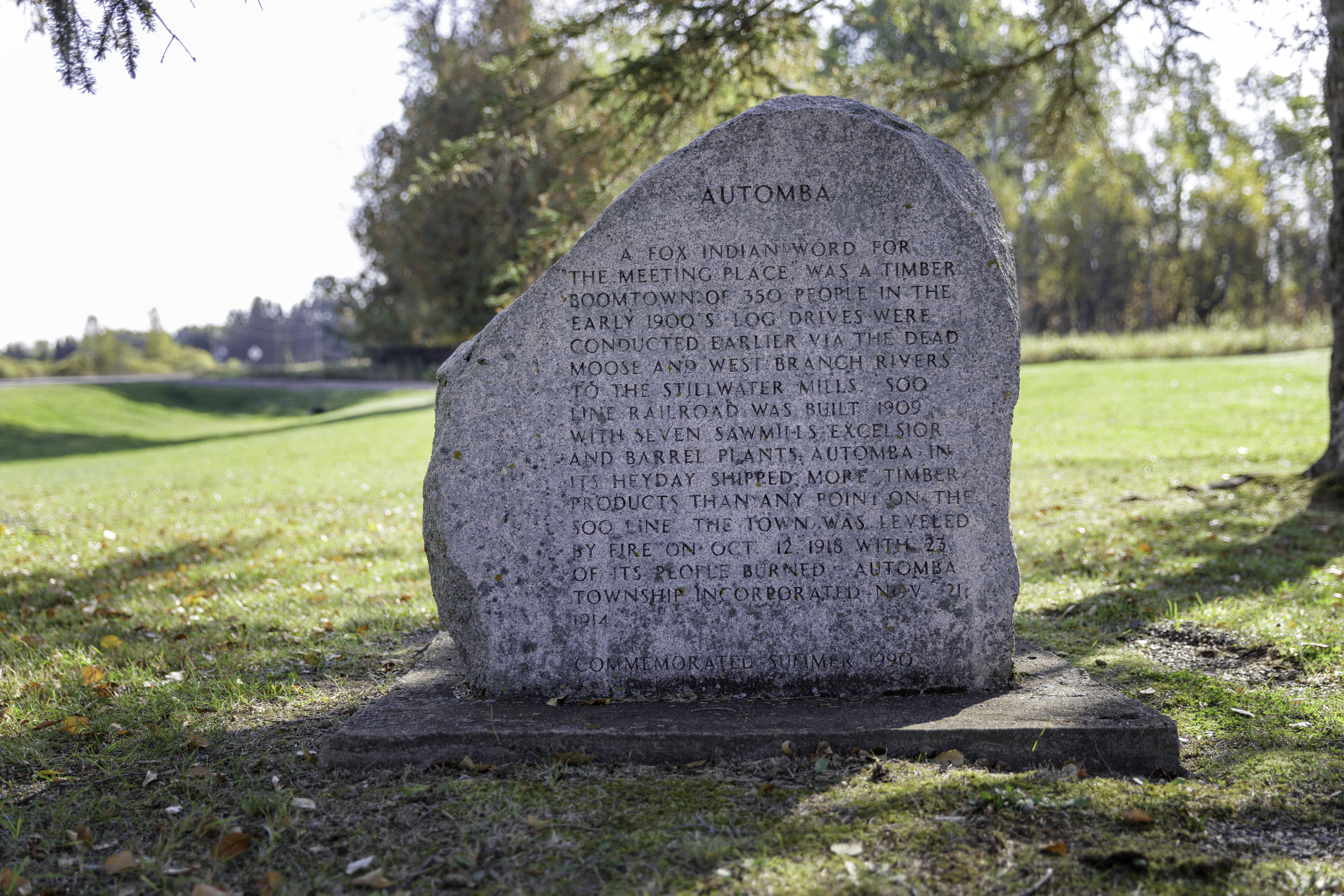
Automba commemorative marker

== Notable person ==
- Irene Reed (1931-2005), anthropologist and linguist
