= Malmo Township, Aitkin County, Minnesota =

Township in Minnesota, United States

Malmo Township
- Township
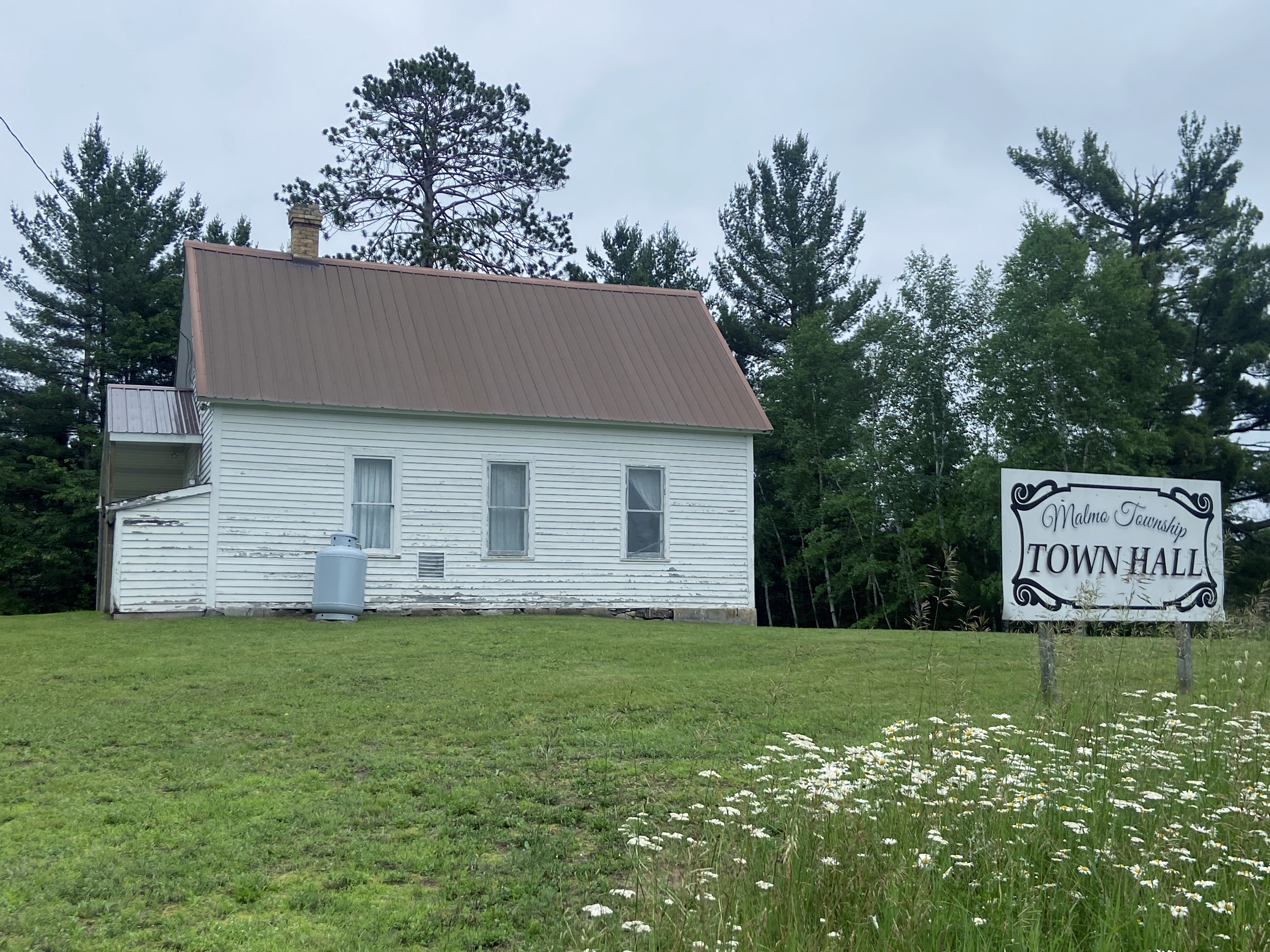
- Malmo Town Hall

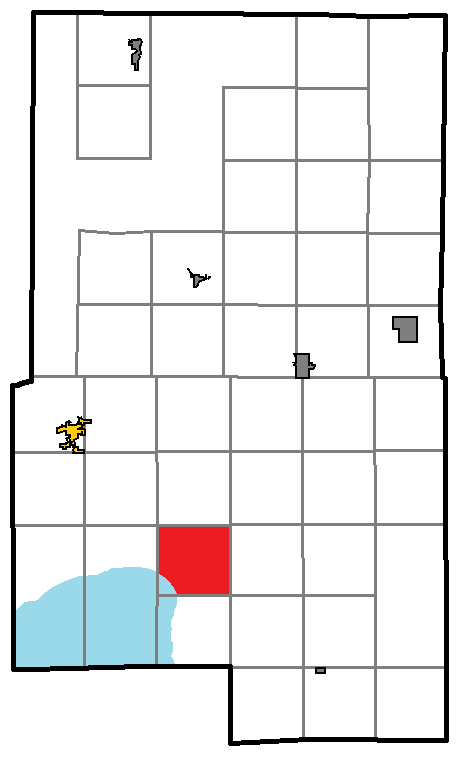
- Location of Malmo Township, within Aitkin County, Minnesota
- Coordinates: 46°21′37″N 93°30′11″W
- Country: United States
- State: Minnesota
- County: Aitkin

Area
  - Total: 35.7 sq mi (92.5 km^{2})
  - Land: 33.0 sq mi (85.4 km^{2})
  - Water: 2.7 sq mi (7.1 km^{2})
- Elevation: 1,283 ft (391 m)

Population (2020)
  - Total: 353
  - Density: 10.7/sq mi (4.13/km^{2})
- Time zone: UTC-6 (Central (CST))
  - Summer (DST): UTC-5 (CDT)
- FIPS code: 27-39590
- GNIS feature ID: 0664880

Malmo Township is a township in Aitkin County, Minnesota, United States. The population was 353 as of the 2020 census.

== History ==
Malmo Township was named after Malmö in Sweden. A precontact Native American archaeological site, the Malmo Mounds and Village Site, is listed on the National Register of Historic Places.

== Geography ==
According to the United States Census Bureau, the township has a total area of 35.7 square miles (92.5 km^{2}), of which 33.0 square miles (85.4 km^{2}) is land and 2.7 square miles (7.1 km^{2}), or 7.68%, is water.

=== Major highways ===
- Minnesota State Highway 18
- Minnesota State Highway 47

=== Lakes ===
- Deer Lake
- Mille Lacs Lake (east edge)
- Sugar Lake (south three-quarters)
  - Stapleton Lake (classified as a pond)
- Twenty Lake is located 1.5 miles North of Malmo on MN Hwy. 47, then 1.75 miles West and North on Twenty Lake Road.

=== Adjacent townships ===
- Glen Township (north)
- Lee Township (northeast)
- Seavey Township (southeast)
- Lakeside Township (south)
- Wealthwood Township (west)
- Nordland Township (northwest)

=== Cemeteries ===
The township contains Malmo Cemetery.

== Demographics ==
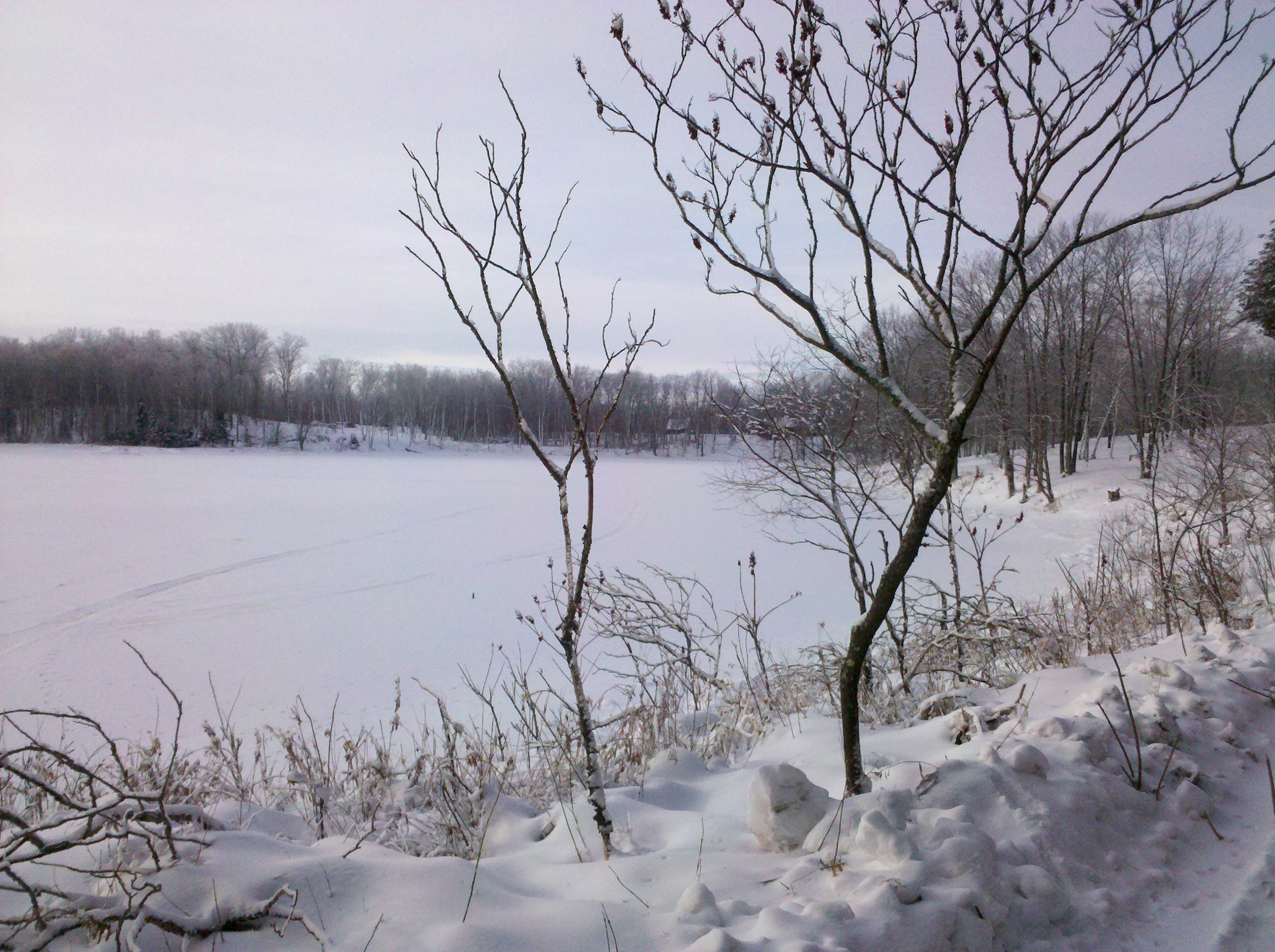
West view Stapleton Lake

As of the census of 2000, there were 332 people, 153 households, and 104 families residing in the township. The population density was 10.1 inhabitants per square mile (3.9/km^{2}). There were 345 housing units at an average density of 10.5 per square mile (4.1/km^{2}). The racial makeup of the township was 96.39% White, 2.71% Native American, and 0.90% from two or more races.

There were 153 households, out of which 17.0% had children under the age of 18 living with them, 60.8% were married couples living together, 4.6% had a female householder with no husband present, and 32.0% were non-families. 28.8% of all households were made up of individuals, and 8.5% had someone living alone who was 65 years of age or older. The average household size was 2.17 and the average family size was 2.59.

In the township the population was spread out, with 18.1% under the age of 18, 6.6% from 18 to 24, 21.1% from 25 to 44, 27.1% from 45 to 64, and 27.1% who were 65 years of age or older. The median age was 50 years. For every 100 females, there were 112.8 males. For every 100 females age 18 and over, there were 110.9 males.

The median income for a household in the township was $31,161, and the median income for a family was $39,464. Males had a median income of $25,000 versus $21,250 for females. The per capita income for the township was $16,737. About 5.3% of families and 9.2% of the population were below the poverty line, including 15.6% of those under age 18 and 3.1% of those age 65 or over.

== Communities ==
Both the unincorporated communities of Glen and Malmo straddle the northern and southern boundaries, respectively. The namesake Glen Store and business district of Glen, is in Malmo Township.
