= Glen, Minnesota =

Unincorporated community in Minnesota, US

Glen
- Unincorporated community
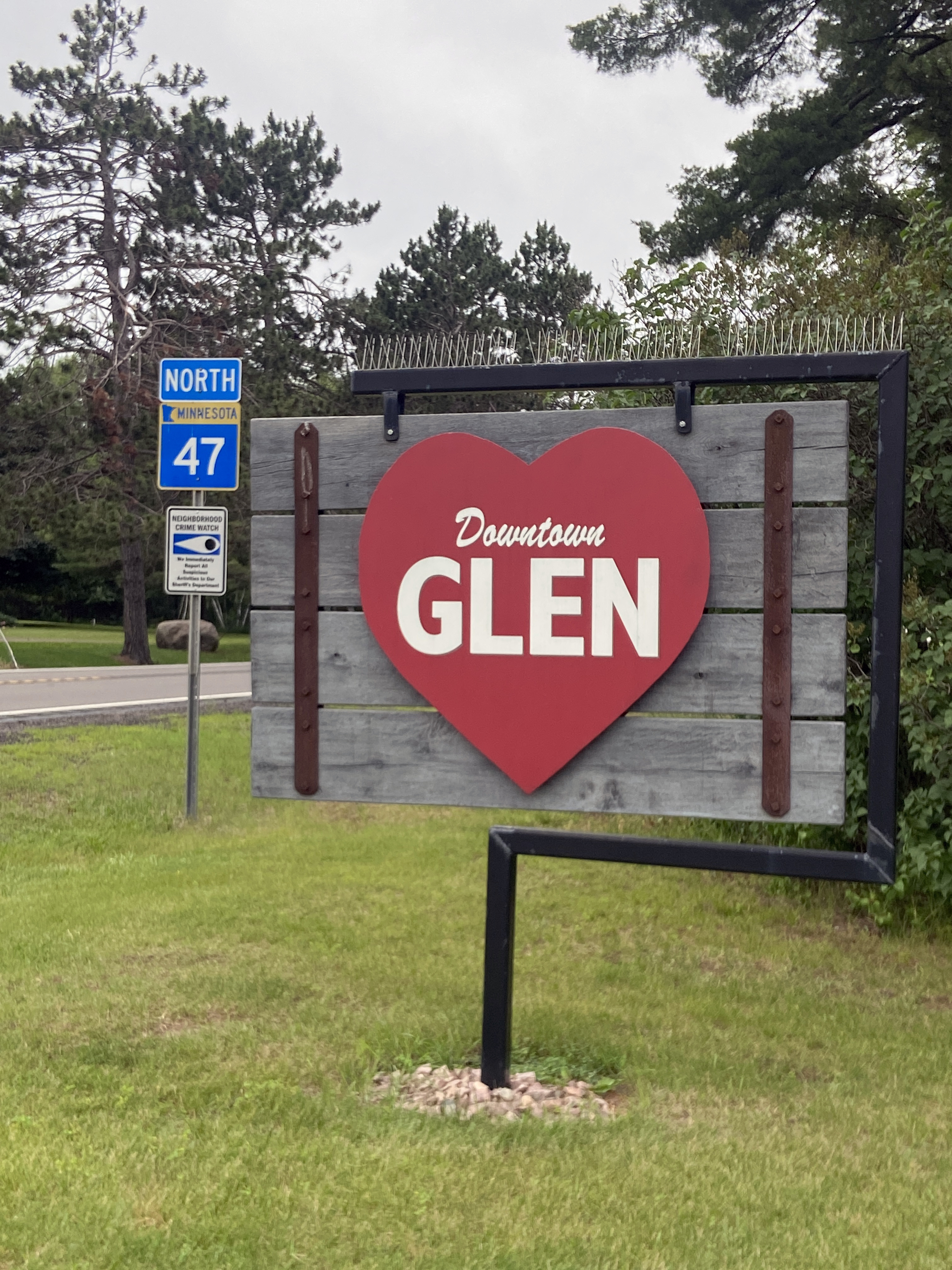
- Nickname: Greater Downtown Glen
- Motto: The Heart
- Location within Minnesota Location within the United States
- Coordinates: 46°25′07″N 93°30′55″W
- Country: United States
- State: Minnesota
- County: Aitkin
- Township: Glen Township and Malmo Township
- Elevation: 1,302 ft (397 m)
- Time zone: UTC-6 (Central (CST))
  - Summer (DST): UTC-5 (CDT)
- ZIP code: 56431
- Area codes: 218 and 320
- GNIS feature ID: 644171

Glen is an unincorporated community and business district in Aitkin County, Minnesota, United States. The community is located southeast of the city of Aitkin at the junction of State Highway 47 (MN 47), Aitkin County Road 12 (Deer Street), and 280th Street.

Glen is located within Glen Township and Malmo Township. Nearby places include Aitkin, Malmo, Isle, Garrison, Bennettville, and Thor. Glen is five miles north of Mille Lacs Lake.

== Business district ==
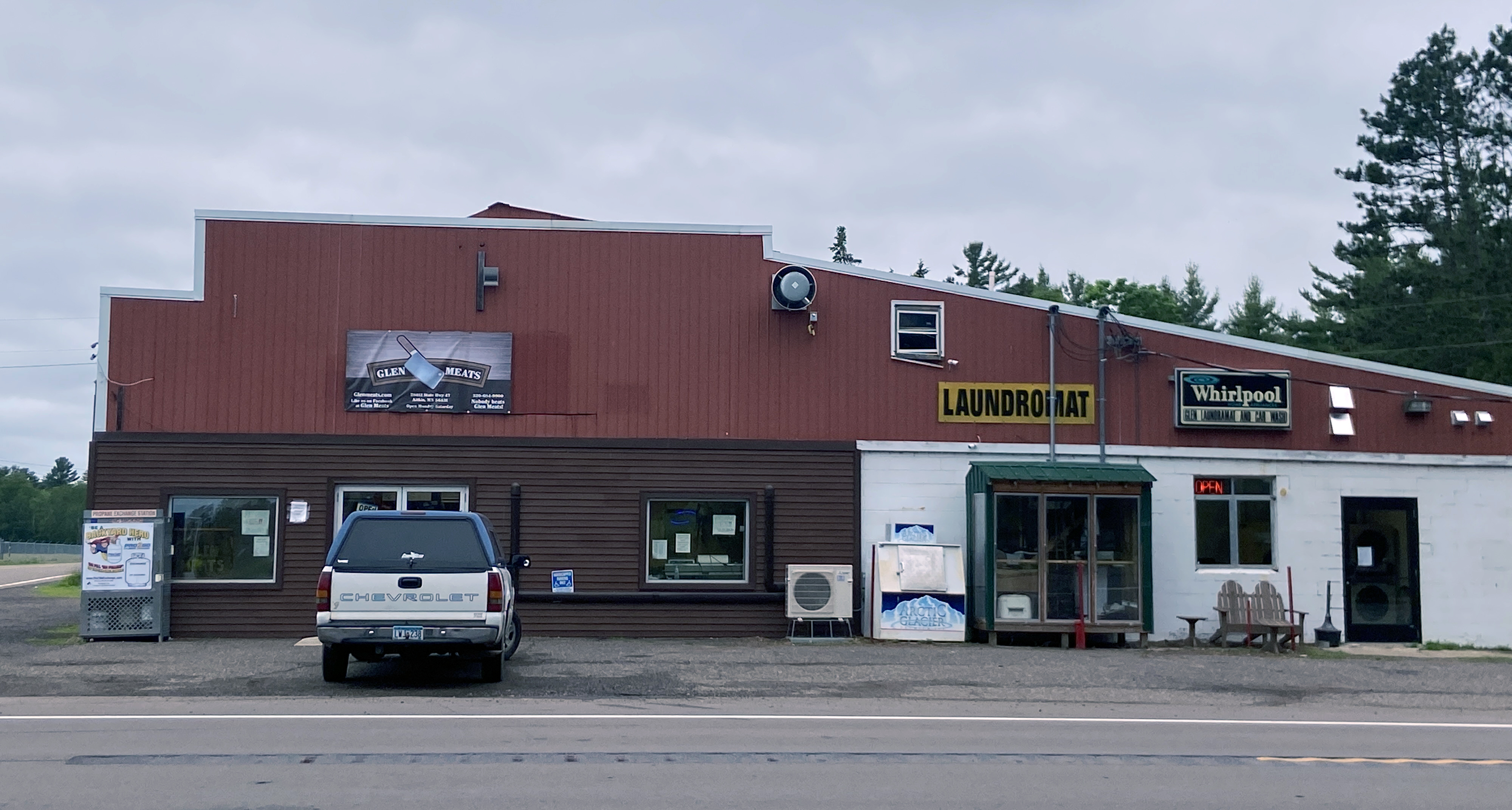
Glen Meats

280th Street forms the township boundary line of Glen Township to the north, and Malmo Township to the south. The namesake Glen Store is along the Malmo side of the township line, as are the bulk of the establishments of the Glen business district. The store, currently replaced with a modern log building, served as the post office from 1899 to 1954.
