= White Pine Township, Aitkin County, Minnesota =

Township in Minnesota, United States

White Pine Township
- Township
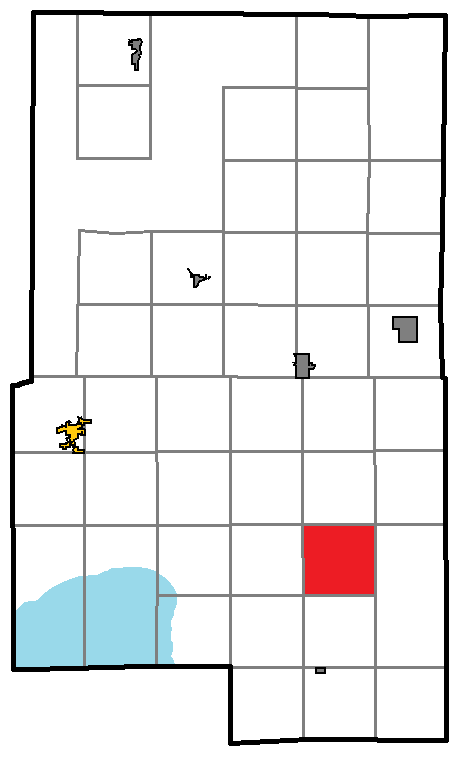
- Location of White Pine Township, within Aitkin County, Minnesota
- Coordinates: 46°21′35″N 93°15′54″W
- Country: United States
- State: Minnesota
- County: Aitkin

Area
  - Total: 36.7 sq mi (95.0 km^{2})
  - Land: 36.7 sq mi (95.0 km^{2})
  - Water: 0 sq mi (0.0 km^{2})
- Elevation: 1,266 ft (386 m)

Population (2020)
  - Total: 38
  - Density: 1.0/sq mi (0.40/km^{2})
- Time zone: UTC-6 (Central (CST))
  - Summer (DST): UTC-5 (CDT)
- FIPS code: 27-70132
- GNIS feature ID: 0665990

White Pine Township is a township in Aitkin County, Minnesota, United States. The population was 38 as of the 2020 census.

== Geography ==
According to the United States Census Bureau, the township has a total area of 36.7 square miles (95.0 km^{2}), of which 0.0077 square miles (0.02 km^{2}), or 0.02%, is water.

=== Major highway ===
- Minnesota State Highway 65

=== Lakes ===
- Twentyone Lake

=== Adjacent townships ===
- Rice River Township (north)
- Beaver Township (northeast)
- Millward Township (east)
- Pliny Township (south)
- Seavey Township (southwest)
- Lee Township (northwest)

== Demographics ==
As of the census of 2000, there were 34 people, 18 households, and 10 families residing in the township. The population density was 0.9 people per square mile (0.4/km^{2}). There were 25 housing units at an average density of 0.7/sq mi (0.3/km^{2}). The racial makeup of the township was 97.06% White, and 2.94% from two or more races.

There were 18 households, out of which 11.1% had children under the age of 18 living with them, 55.6% were married couples living together, and 38.9% were non-families. 33.3% of all households were made up of individuals, and 22.2% had someone living alone who was 65 years of age or older. The average household size was 1.89 and the average family size was 2.36.

In the township the population was spread out, with 8.8% under the age of 18, 2.9% from 18 to 24, 20.6% from 25 to 44, 23.5% from 45 to 64, and 44.1% who were 65 years of age or older. The median age was 62 years. For every 100 females, there were 112.5 males. For every 100 females age 18 and over, there were 121.4 males.

The median income for a household in the township was $17,500, and the median income for a family was $30,625. Males had a median income of $13,750 versus $31,250 for females. The per capita income for the township was $16,163. There were no families and 8.3% of the population living below the poverty line, including no under eighteens and none of those over 64.
