= Lee Township, Aitkin County, Minnesota =

Township in Minnesota, United States

Lee Township
- Township
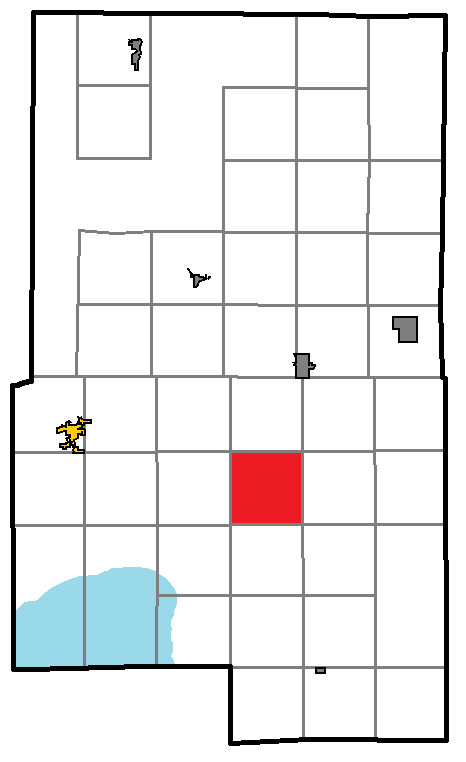
- Location of Lee Township, within Aitkin County, Minnesota
- Coordinates: 46°29′24″N 93°21′30″W
- Country: United States
- State: Minnesota
- County: Aitkin

Area
  - Total: 35.6 sq mi (92.3 km^{2})
  - Land: 34.4 sq mi (89.2 km^{2})
  - Water: 1.2 sq mi (3.1 km^{2})
- Elevation: 1,270 ft (387 m)

Population (2020)
  - Total: 38
  - Density: 1.1/sq mi (0.43/km^{2})
- Time zone: UTC-6 (Central (CST))
  - Summer (DST): UTC-5 (CDT)
- FIPS code: 27-36152
- GNIS feature ID: 0664743

Lee Township is a township in Aitkin County, Minnesota, United States. The population was 38 as of the 2020 census.

== History ==
Lee Township was named for Olaf Lee, an early settler and native of Norway.

== Geography ==
According to the United States Census Bureau, the township has a total area of 35.6 square miles (92.3 km^{2}), of which 34.4 square miles (89.2 km^{2}) is land and 1.2 square miles (3.1 km^{2}), or 3.40%, is water.

=== Lakes ===
- Rice Lake (south quarter)

=== Adjacent townships ===
- Spalding Township (northeast)
- Rice River Township (east)
- White Pine Township (southeast)
- Malmo Township (southwest)
- Glen Township (west)
- Kimberly Township (northwest)

== Demographics ==
As of the census of 2000, there were 54 people, 22 households, and 17 families residing in the township. The population density was 1.6 inhabitants per square mile (0.62/km^{2}). There were 45 housing units at an average density of 1.3 per square mile (0.50/km^{2}). The racial makeup of the township was 98.15% White, and 1.85% from two or more races.

There were 22 households, out of which 31.8% had children under the age of 18 living with them, 68.2% were married couples living together, 9.1% had a female householder with no husband present, and 22.7% were non-families. 22.7% of all households were made up of individuals, and 9.1% had someone living alone who was 65 years of age or older. The average household size was 2.45 and the average family size was 2.76.

In the township the population was spread out, with 25.9% under the age of 18, 35.2% from 25 to 44, 20.4% from 45 to 64, and 18.5% who were 65 years of age or older. The median age was 40 years. For every 100 females, there were 107.7 males. For every 100 females age 18 and over, there were 122.2 males.

The median income for a household in the township was $28,750, and the median income for a family was $27,500. Males had a median income of $49,583 versus $18,333 for females. The per capita income for the township was $19,319. There were 7.7% of families and 5.9% of the population living below the poverty line, including no under eighteens and none of those over 64.
