= Seavey Township, Aitkin County, Minnesota =

Township in Minnesota, United States

Seavey Township
- Township
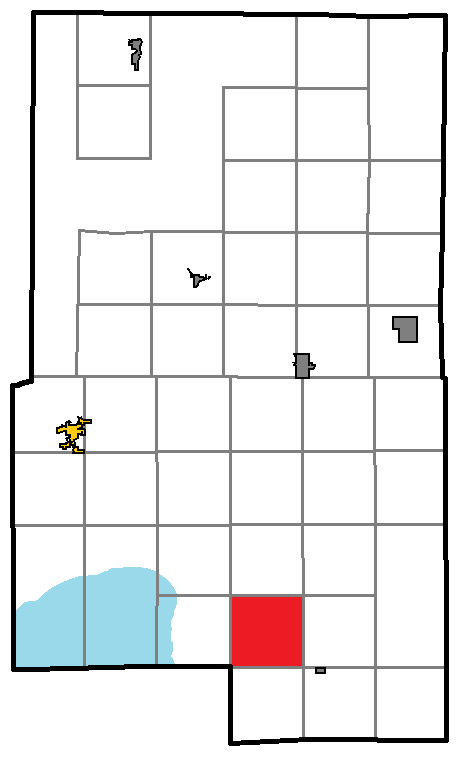
- Location of Seavey Township, within Aitkin County, Minnesota
- Coordinates: 46°16′40″N 93°22′43″W
- Country: United States
- State: Minnesota
- County: Aitkin

Area
  - Total: 36.3 sq mi (93.9 km^{2})
  - Land: 36.3 sq mi (93.9 km^{2})
  - Water: 0 sq mi (0.0 km^{2})
- Elevation: 1,309 ft (399 m)

Population (2020)
  - Total: 64
  - Density: 1.8/sq mi (0.68/km^{2})
- Time zone: UTC-6 (Central (CST))
  - Summer (DST): UTC-5 (CDT)
- FIPS code: 27-59134
- GNIS feature ID: 0665572

Seavey Township is a township in Aitkin County, Minnesota, United States. The population was 64 as of the 2020 census.

== Geography ==
According to the United States Census Bureau, the township has a total area of 36.3 square miles (93.9 km^{2}), all land.

=== Adjacent townships ===
- White Pine Township (northeast)
- Pliny Township (east)
- Williams Township (southeast)
- Idun Township (south)
- East Side Township, Mille Lacs County (southwest)
- Lakeside Township (west)
- Malmo Township (northwest)

=== Cemeteries ===
The township contains the following cemeteries: Holden and Ostlund.

== Demographics ==
As of the census of 2000, there were 64 people, 31 households, and 16 families residing in the township. The population density was 1.8 people per square mile (0.7/km^{2}). There were 79 housing units at an average density of 2.2/sq mi (0.8/km^{2}). The racial makeup of the township was 100.00% White.

There were 31 households, out of which 16.1% had children under the age of 18 living with them, 41.9% were married couples living together, and 45.2% were non-families. 45.2% of all households were made up of individuals, and 12.9% had someone living alone who was 65 years of age or older. The average household size was 2.06 and the average family size was 2.88.

In the township the population was spread out, with 18.8% under the age of 18, 1.6% from 18 to 24, 29.7% from 25 to 44, 31.3% from 45 to 64, and 18.8% who were 65 years of age or older. The median age was 45 years. For every 100 females, there were 137.0 males. For every 100 females age 18 and over, there were 136.4 males.

The median income for a household in the township was $30,000, and the median income for a family was $31,250. Males had a median income of $44,375 versus $11,250 for females. The per capita income for the township was $24,582. There were 15.0% of families and 21.1% of the population living below the poverty line, including 28.6% of under eighteens and 23.8% of those over 64.
