= Glen Township, Aitkin County, Minnesota =

Township in Minnesota, United States

Glen Township
- Township
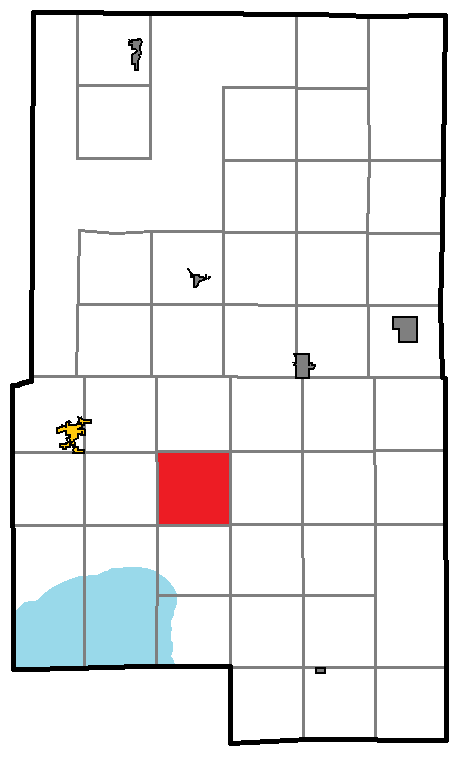
- Location of Glen Township, within Aitkin County, Minnesota
- Coordinates: 46°27′14″N 93°29′32″W
- Country: United States
- State: Minnesota
- County: Aitkin

Area
  - Total: 36.6 sq mi (94.8 km^{2})
  - Land: 33.8 sq mi (87.6 km^{2})
  - Water: 2.8 sq mi (7.2 km^{2})
- Elevation: 1,309 ft (399 m)

Population (2020)
  - Total: 432
  - Density: 12.8/sq mi (4.93/km^{2})
- Time zone: UTC-6 (Central (CST))
  - Summer (DST): UTC-5 (CDT)
- ZIP code: 56431
- Area code: 320
- FIPS code: 27-23930
- GNIS feature ID: 0664275

Glen Township is a township in Aitkin County, Minnesota, United States. The population was 432 as of the 2020 census.

== Geography ==
According to the United States Census Bureau, the township has a total area of 36.6 square miles (94.8 km^{2}), of which 33.8 square miles (87.6 km^{2}) is land and 2.8 square miles (7.2 km^{2}), or 7.59%, is water. Located within and adjacent to Glen Township is an unincorporated community and business district, named Glen, with a restaurant, bar, garage, corner store and laundry.

=== Major highway ===
- Minnesota State Highway 47

=== Lakes ===
- Clear Lake
- Dam Lake (southwest quarter)
- Johnson Lake
- Lily Lake
- Long Lake
- Rabbit Lake
- Spring Lake
- Sugar Lake (north quarter)
- Swamp Lake
- Thirty-One Lake (vast majority)
- Turtle Lake (east quarter)

=== Adjacent townships ===
- Kimberly Township (north)
- Lee Township (east)
- Malmo Township (south)
- Wealthwood Township (southwest)
- Nordland Township (west)
- Spencer Township (northwest)

=== Cemeteries ===
The township contains the following cemeteries: Rabbit Lake and Saron.

== Demographics ==
As of the census of 2000, there were 442 people, 207 households, and 145 families residing in the township. The population density was 13.1 inhabitants per square mile (5.1/km^{2}). There were 563 housing units at an average density of 16.7 per square mile (6.4/km^{2}). The racial makeup of the township was 99.32% White, 0.23% Asian, 0.23% from other races, and 0.23% from two or more races. Hispanic or Latino of any race were 0.45% of the population.

There were 207 households, out of which 14.5% had children under the age of 18 living with them, 62.3% were married couples living together, 3.4% had a female householder with no husband present, and 29.5% were non-families. 25.1% of all households were made up of individuals, and 14.0% had someone living alone who was 65 years of age or older. The average household size was 2.14 and the average family size was 2.51.

In the township the population was spread out, with 15.8% under the age of 18, 2.9% from 18 to 24, 20.1% from 25 to 44, 34.6% from 45 to 64, and 26.5% who were 65 years of age or older. The median age was 52 years. For every 100 females, there were 110.5 males. For every 100 females age 18 and over, there were 106.7 males.

The median income for a household in the township was $32,500, and the median income for a family was $41,875. Males had a median income of $24,545 versus $21,250 for females. The per capita income for the township was $21,908. About 3.7% of families and 6.5% of the population were below the poverty line, including 5.2% of those under age 18 and 3.5% of those age 65 or over.
