= Malmo Mounds and Village Site =

- U.S. National Register of Historic Places
- U.S. Historic district
- Nearest city: McGrath, Minnesota
- Area: 100 acres (40 ha)
- NRHP reference No.: 75000974
- Added to NRHP: April 3, 1975

Malmo Mounds and Village Site is a mound group in Aitkin County, Minnesota, located on the northeast shore of Mille Lacs Lake. The property was placed on the National Register of Historic Places by the Department of the Interior in 1975 due to its archeological and cultural significance.

This area was first surveyed in 1893 by W.H. Winchell and again in 1899 by J.V. Brower and David I. Bushnell. Brower and Bushnell identified 128 mounds and noted that the site was an ideal location for a village site.

In 1936, a group from the University of Minnesota, led by Gordon Erkholm, excavated 13 mounds. The information from this survey was the basis for Dr. Wilford's "Mille Lacs Aspect" of the Minnesota Woodland period.

Over the past hundred years, there has been a number of factors that have led to the destruction of over half of the original mound group. Many of the mounds were leveled in 1939 during the building of Minnesota State Highway 18; others were leveled in order to build lake cottages, and many have small pits dug into them. No scholarly work has been done at the site since 1970. Today, the remaining mound group is privately owned and part of Malmo Bay Campground.

A type of pottery, known as Malmo Ware, is named after this site. From the University of Minnesota Anthropology Department: "Malmo ware vessels are smooth surfaced, grit- or limestone-tempered, conoidal-shaped jars with a wide mouth, straight rim, and slight or no constriction of the neck. Vessels are undecorated or decorated on the upper exterior surface with various combinations of horizontal bands of dentate stamping, slashes, punctuates, bosses, or other decorative techniques. Malmo ware is thought to be the earliest pottery ware in the Mille Lacs locality. There is some uncertainty as to the earliest and latest dates of the ware, but they seem firmly dated to the Initial Woodland period."
