= Kalevala Township, Carlton County, Minnesota =

Kalevala Township, Minnesota
- Township
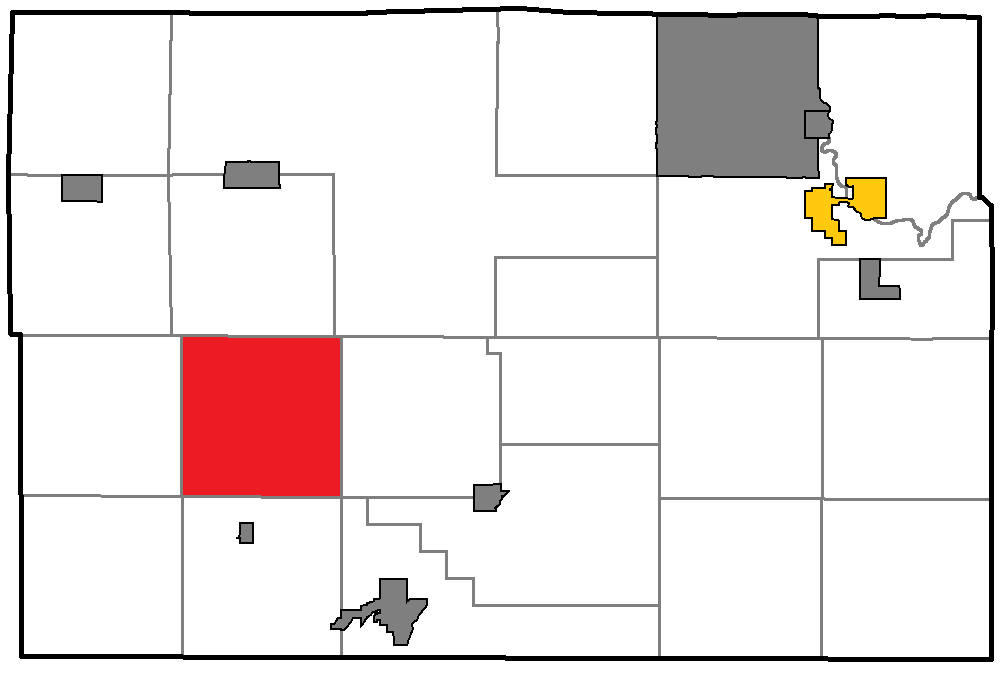
- Location of Kalevala Township within Carlton County, Minnesota
- Coordinates: 46°32′41″N 92°53′36″W
- Country: United States
- State: Minnesota
- County: Carlton

Area
  - Total: 35.8 sq mi (92.7 km^{2})
  - Land: 35.8 sq mi (92.7 km^{2})
  - Water: 0 sq mi (0.0 km^{2})
- Elevation: 1,234 ft (376 m)

Population (2020)
  - Total: 304
  - Density: 8.49/sq mi (3.28/km^{2})
- Time zone: UTC-6 (Central (CST))
  - Summer (DST): UTC-5 (CDT)
- FIPS code: 27-32264
- GNIS feature ID: 0664592

Kalevala Township is a township in Carlton County, Minnesota, United States. The population was 304 as of the 2020 census.

== History ==
Kalevala Township was named by Finnish settlers after the poem Kalevala, a national symbol of Finland.

== Geography ==
According to the United States Census Bureau, the township has a total area of 35.8 square miles (93 km^{2}), all land.

=== Major highway ===
- Minnesota State Highway 73

=== Adjacent townships ===
- Eagle Township (north)
- Skelton Township (east)
- Moose Lake Township (southeast)
- Silver Township (south)
- Split Rock Township (southwest)
- Automba Township (west)

=== Cemeteries ===
The township contains the following cemeteries: Leonard and West Branch.

== Demographics ==
As of the census of 2000, there were 302 people, 125 households, and 80 families residing in the township. The population density was 8.4 inhabitants per square mile (3.2/km^{2}). There were 181 housing units at an average density of 5.1 per square mile (2.0/km^{2}). The racial makeup of the township was 99.01% White, 0.66% Pacific Islander, and 0.33% from two or more races. 34.9% were of Finnish, 14.9% German, 9.8% Norwegian, 8.4% American and 8.0% Polish ancestry according to Census 2000.

There were 125 households, out of which 24.8% had children under the age of 18 living with them, 55.2% were married couples living together, 5.6% had a female householder with no husband present, and 36.0% were non-families. 31.2% of all households were made up of individuals, and 14.4% had someone living alone who was 65 years of age or older. The average household size was 2.42 and the average family size was 3.09.

In the township the population was spread out, with 23.2% under the age of 18, 6.3% from 18 to 24, 27.2% from 25 to 44, 27.2% from 45 to 64, and 16.2% who were 65 years of age or older. The median age was 42 years. For every 100 females, there were 115.7 males. For every 100 females age 18 and over, there were 116.8 males.

The median income for a household in the township was $33,333, and the median income for a family was $41,875. Males had a median income of $29,688 versus $26,000 for females. The per capita income for the township was $17,144. About 4.6% of families and 4.5% of the population were below the poverty line, including none of those under the age of eighteen or sixty five or over.
