= Hill Lake Township, Aitkin County, Minnesota =

Township in Minnesota, United States

Hill Lake Township
- Township
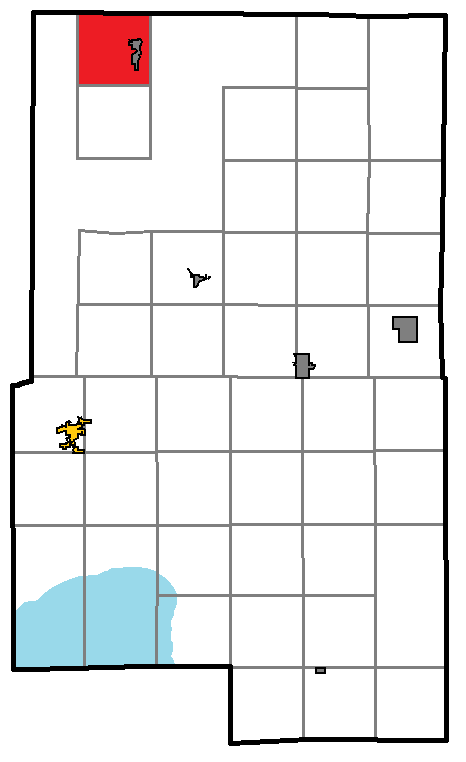
- Location of Hill Lake Township, within Aitkin County, Minnesota
- Coordinates: 46°58′46″N 93°37′0″W
- Country: United States
- State: Minnesota
- County: Aitkin

Area
  - Total: 34.4 sq mi (89.1 km^{2})
  - Land: 33.2 sq mi (86.1 km^{2})
  - Water: 1.1 sq mi (2.9 km^{2})
- Elevation: 1,289 ft (393 m)

Population (2020)
  - Total: 435
  - Density: 13.1/sq mi (5.05/km^{2})
- Time zone: UTC-6 (Central (CST))
  - Summer (DST): UTC-5 (CDT)
- FIPS code: 27-29114
- GNIS feature ID: 0664475

Hill Lake Township is a township in Aitkin County, Minnesota, United States. The population was 435 as of the 2020 census.

== Geography ==
According to the United States Census Bureau, the township has a total area of 34.4 square miles (89.1 km^{2}), of which 33.2 square miles (86.1 km^{2}) is land and 1.1 square miles (2.9 km^{2}), or 3.31%, is water.

The city of Hill City lies within the township but is a separate entity.

=== Major highways ===
- U.S. Highway 169
- Minnesota State Highway 200

=== Lakes ===
- Bible Lake
- Chamberlin Lake
- Hill Lake (vast majority)
- Previs Lake

=== Adjacent townships ===
- Wildwood Township, Itasca County (northeast)
- Macville Township (south)
- Spang Township, Itasca County (northwest)

=== Cemeteries ===
The township contains Hill Lake Cemetery.

== Demographics ==
As of the census of 2000, there were 447 people, 167 households, and 121 families residing in the township. The population density was 13.4 inhabitants per square mile (5.2/km^{2}). There were 296 housing units at an average density of 8.9 per square mile (3.4/km^{2}). The racial makeup of the township was 96.64% White, 0.22% African American, 1.12% Native American, and 2.01% from two or more races. Hispanic or Latino of any race were 0.22% of the population.

There were 167 households, out of which 29.9% had children under the age of 18 living with them, 65.3% were married couples living together, 4.2% had a female householder with no husband present, and 27.5% were non-families. 19.8% of all households were made up of individuals, and 6.6% had someone living alone who was 65 years of age or older. The average household size was 2.68 and the average family size was 3.10.

In the township the population was spread out, with 27.1% under the age of 18, 6.7% from 18 to 24, 28.0% from 25 to 44, 25.7% from 45 to 64, and 12.5% who were 65 years of age or older. The median age was 38 years. For every 100 females, there were 101.4 males. For every 100 females age 18 and over, there were 106.3 males.

The median income for a household in the township was $40,000, and the median income for a family was $47,250. Males had a median income of $31,250 versus $21,250 for females. The per capita income for the township was $16,915. About 3.1% of families and 5.4% of the population were below the poverty line, including 4.2% of those under age 18 and 5.4% of those age 65 or over.
