= Split Rock Township, Carlton County, Minnesota =

Split Rock Township, Minnesota
- Township
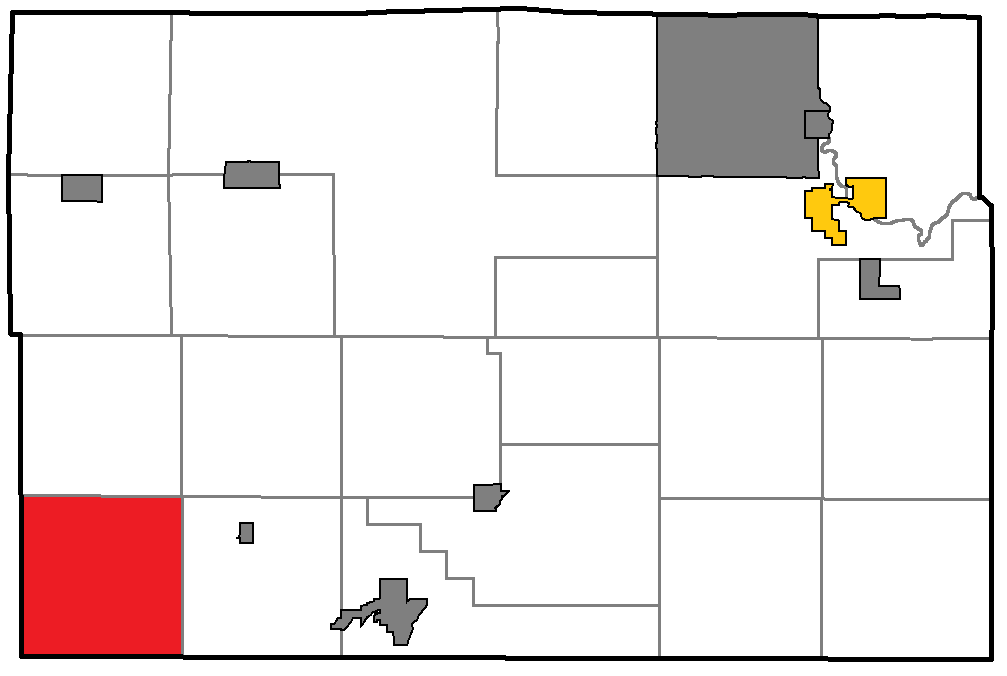
- Location of Split Rock Township within Carlton County, Minnesota
- Coordinates: 46°27′4″N 92°58′31″W
- Country: United States
- State: Minnesota
- County: Carlton

Area
  - Total: 36.6 sq mi (94.8 km^{2})
  - Land: 36.6 sq mi (94.8 km^{2})
  - Water: 0 sq mi (0.0 km^{2})
- Elevation: 1,204 ft (367 m)

Population (2020)
  - Total: 161
  - Density: 4.40/sq mi (1.70/km^{2})
- Time zone: UTC-6 (Central (CST))
  - Summer (DST): UTC-5 (CDT)
- FIPS code: 27-61708
- GNIS feature ID: 0665665

Split Rock Township is a township in Carlton County, Minnesota, United States. The population was 161 in the 2020 Census. Split Rock Township took its name from the Split Rock River.

== Geography ==
According to the United States Census Bureau, the township has a total area of 36.6 square miles (94.8 km^{2}), all land.

Split Rock Township is the farthest southwest organized township in Carlton County.

=== Adjacent townships ===
- Automba Township (north)
- Kalevala Township (northeast)
- Silver Township (east)
- Sturgeon Lake Township, Pine County (southeast)
- Birch Creek Township, Pine County (south)
- Millward Township, Aitkin County (southwest)
- Beaver Township, Aitkin County (west)
- Salo Township, Aitkin County (northwest)

=== Cemeteries ===
The township contains Saint Joseph's Cemetery.

== Demographics ==
At the 2000 census, there were 124 people, 55 households and 31 families residing in the township. The population density was 3.4 per square mile (1.3/km^{2}). There were 100 housing units at an average density of 2.7/sq mi (1.1/km^{2}). The racial makeup of the township was 99.19% White, and 0.81% from two or more races. Hispanic or Latino of any race were 0.81% of the population. 31.9% were of Polish, 20.4% Finnish, 15.0% German and 11.5% American ancestry according to 2000 United States census.

There were 55 households, of which 30.9% had children under the age of 18 living with them, 43.6% were married couples living together, 9.1% had a female householder with no husband present, and 43.6% were non-families. 41.8% of all households were made up of individuals, and 25.5% had someone living alone who was 65 years of age or older. The average household size was 2.25 and the average family size was 3.13.

29.8% of the population were under the age of 18, 4.0% from 18 to 24, 25.8% from 25 to 44, 21.8% from 45 to 64, and 18.5% who were 65 years of age or older. The median age was 41 years. For every 100 females, there were 90.8 males. For every 100 females age 18 and over, there were 97.7 males.

The median household income was $26,250 and the median family income was $43,750. Males had a median income of $37,500 and females $16,875. The per capita income was $17,677. There were 16.7% of families and 17.3% of the population living below the poverty line, including 25.0% of under eighteens and 30.8% of those over 64.
