= Automba Township, Carlton County, Minnesota =

Automba Township, Minnesota
- Township
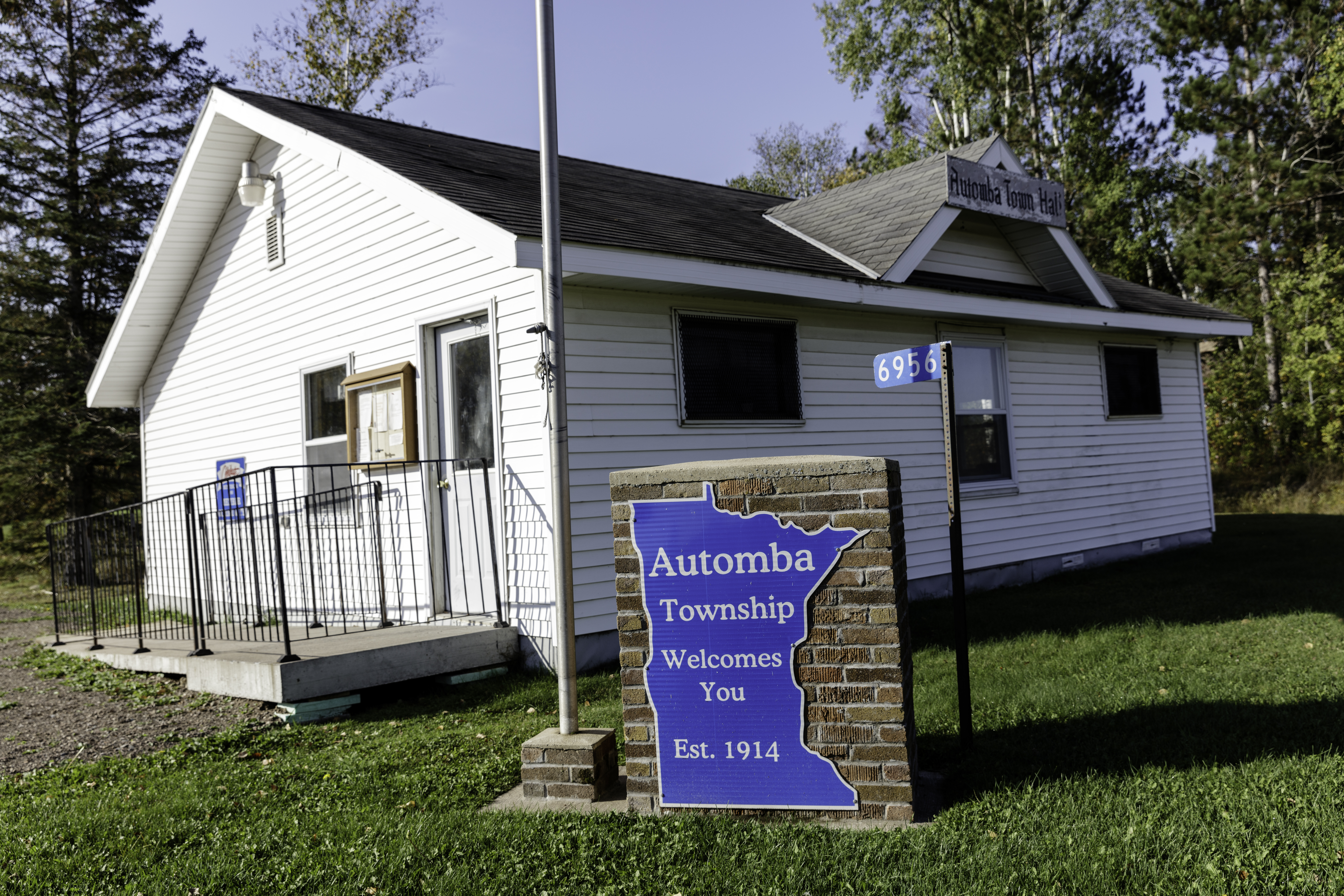
- Automba Town Hall

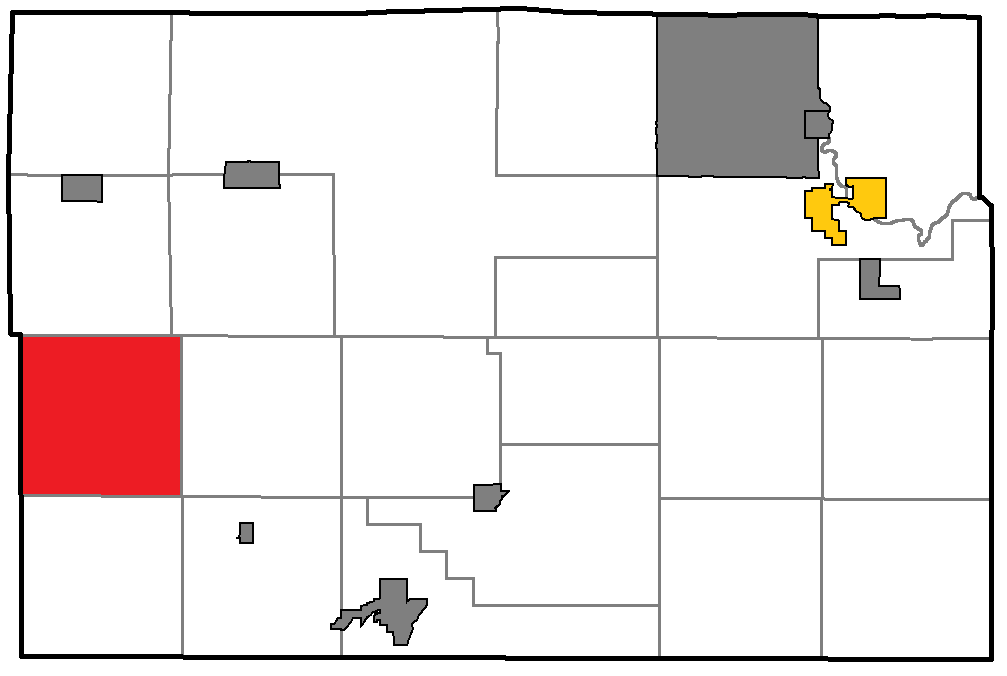
- Location of Automba Township within Carlton County, Minnesota
- Coordinates: 46°32′44″N 92°59′11″W
- Country: United States
- State: Minnesota
- County: Carlton

Area
  - Total: 36.4 sq mi (94.3 km^{2})
  - Land: 36.4 sq mi (94.2 km^{2})
  - Water: 0 sq mi (0.0 km^{2})
- Elevation: 1,289 ft (393 m)

Population (2020)
  - Total: 150
  - Density: 4.1/sq mi (1.6/km^{2})
- Time zone: UTC-6 (Central (CST))
  - Summer (DST): UTC-5 (CDT)
- FIPS code: 27-03016
- GNIS feature ID: 0663484

Automba Township is a township in Carlton County, Minnesota, United States. The population was 150 as of the 2020 census. Automba Township was named after the community of Automba.

== Geography ==
According to the United States Census Bureau, the township has a total area of 36.4 square miles (94 km^{2}), of which 36.4 square miles (94 km^{2}) is land and 0.03% is water.

=== Unincorporated community ===
- Automba

=== Adjacent townships ===
- Lakeview Township (north)
- Eagle Township (northeast)
- Kalevala Township (east)
- Silver Township (southeast)
- Split Rock Township (south)
- Beaver Township, Aitkin County (southwest)
- Salo Township, Aitkin County (west)

== Demographics ==
As of the census of 2000, there were 137 people, 52 households, and 40 families residing in the township. The population density was 3.8 inhabitants per square mile (1.5/km^{2}). There were 94 housing units at an average density of 2.6 per square mile (1.0/km^{2}). The racial makeup of the township was 95.62% White, 2.92% Native American, 0.73% Asian, and 0.73% from two or more races. 38.9% were of Finnish, 18.6% German, 12.4% Norwegian, 8.8% Polish and 8.0% American ancestry according to Census 2000.

There were 52 households, out of which 19.2% had children under the age of 18 living with them, 53.8% were married couples living together, 11.5% had a female householder with no husband present, and 21.2% were non-families. 17.3% of all households were made up of individuals, and 1.9% had someone living alone who was 65 years of age or older. The average household size was 2.63 and the average family size was 2.85.

In the township the population was spread out, with 20.4% under the age of 18, 13.1% from 18 to 24, 22.6% from 25 to 44, 29.9% from 45 to 64, and 13.9% who were 65 years of age or older. The median age was 40 years. For every 100 females, there were 121.0 males. For every 100 females age 18 and over, there were 109.6 males.

The median income for a household in the township was $36,000, and the median income for a family was $39,375. Males had a median income of $32,143 versus $35,536 for females. The per capita income for the township was $17,524. There were 5.4% of families and 10.4% of the population living below the poverty line, including 3.7% of under eighteens and none of those over 64.
