= Lakeside Township, Aitkin County, Minnesota =

Township in Minnesota, United States

Lakeside Township
- Township
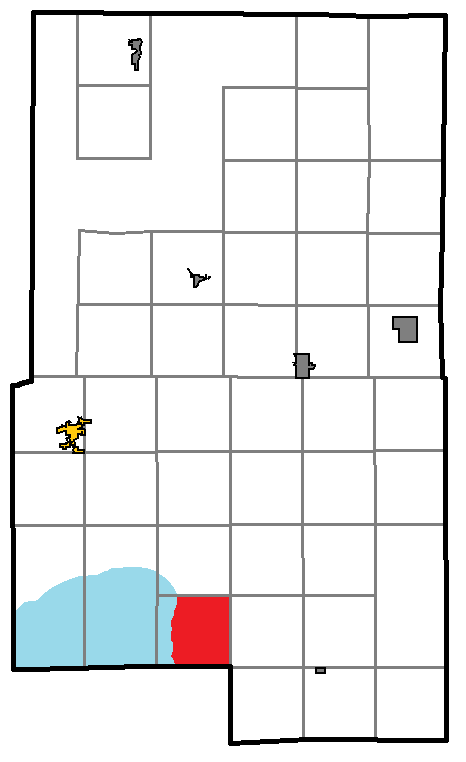
- Location of Lakeside Township, within Aitkin County, Minnesota
- Coordinates: 46°17′12″N 93°31′41″W
- Country: United States
- State: Minnesota
- County: Aitkin

Area
  - Total: 36.8 sq mi (95.3 km^{2})
  - Land: 29.0 sq mi (75.1 km^{2})
  - Water: 7.8 sq mi (20.3 km^{2})
- Elevation: 1,302 ft (397 m)

Population (2020)
  - Total: 504
  - Density: 17.4/sq mi (6.71/km^{2})
- Time zone: UTC-6 (Central (CST))
  - Summer (DST): UTC-5 (CDT)
- FIPS code: 27-34982
- GNIS feature ID: 0664701
- Website: https://www.lakesidetownship.com/

Lakeside Township is a township in Aitkin County, Minnesota, United States. The population was 504 as of the 2020 census.

== History ==
Lakeside Township was named from its location on Mille Lacs Lake.

== Geography ==
According to the United States Census Bureau, the township has a total area of 36.8 square miles (95.3 km^{2}), of which 29.0 square miles (75.1 km^{2}) is land and 7.8 square miles (20.3 km^{2}), or 21.26%, is water. The township is located on the east shore of Mille Lacs Lake, the second-largest inland lake in Minnesota.

=== Major highway ===
- Minnesota State Highway 18

=== Lakes ===
- Mille Lacs Lake (east edge)

=== Adjacent townships ===
- Malmo Township (north)
- Seavey Township (east)
- Idun Township (southeast)
- East Side Township, Mille Lacs County (south)
- South Harbor Township, Mille Lacs County (southwest)
- Wealthwood Township (west)

=== Cemeteries ===
The township contains Lakeside Cemetery.

== Demographics ==
As of the census of 2000, there were 495 people, 240 households, and 161 families residing in the township. The population density was 17.0 inhabitants per square mile (6.6/km^{2}). There were 579 housing units at an average density of 19.9 per square mile (7.7/km^{2}). The racial makeup of the township was 98.18% White, 1.01% Native American, 0.40% Asian, 0.20% Pacific Islander, and 0.20% from two or more races. Hispanic or Latino of any race were 0.20% of the population.

There were 240 households, out of which 14.2% had children under the age of 18 living with them, 60.4% were married couples living together, 3.8% had a female householder with no husband present, and 32.9% were non-families. 30.0% of all households were made up of individuals, and 12.5% had someone living alone who was 65 years of age or older. The average household size was 2.06 and the average family size was 2.52.

In the township the population was spread out, with 16.6% under the age of 18, 3.6% from 18 to 24, 15.6% from 25 to 44, 36.2% from 45 to 64, and 28.1% who were 65 years of age or older. The median age was 54 years. For every 100 females, there were 115.2 males. For every 100 females age 18 and over, there were 112.9 males.

The median income for a household in the township was $28,462, and the median income for a family was $31,818. Males had a median income of $34,375 versus $17,917 for females. The per capita income for the township was $19,908. About 9.0% of families and 9.3% of the population were below the poverty line, including 21.6% of those under age 18 and 6.3% of those age 65 or over.
