= Silver Township, Carlton County, Minnesota =

Silver Township, Minnesota
- Township
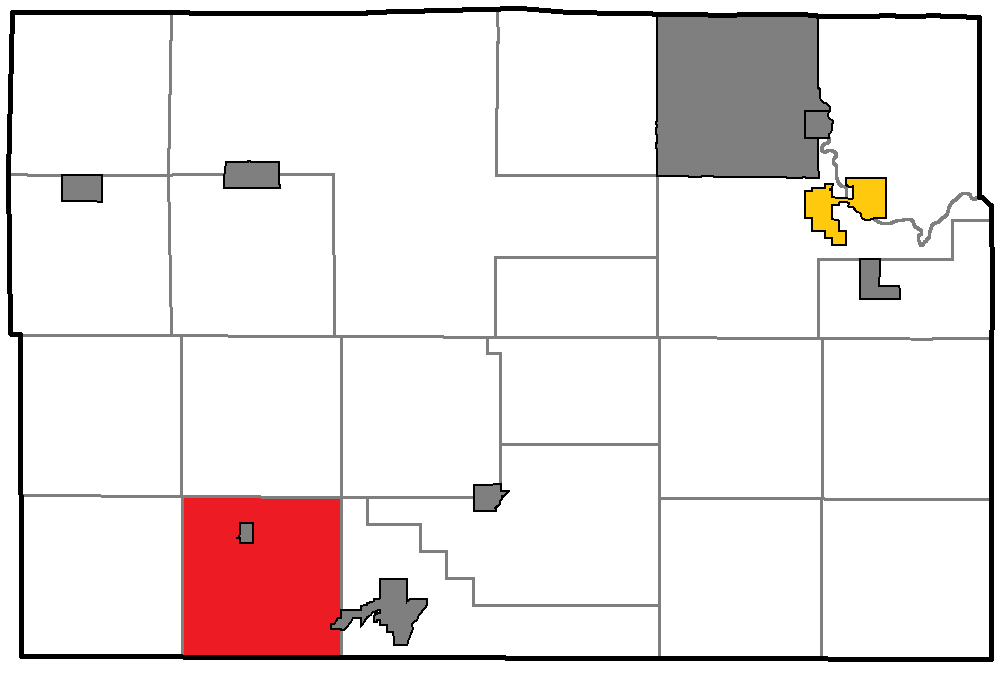
- Location of Silver Township within Carlton County, Minnesota
- Coordinates: 46°28′12″N 92°51′58″W
- Country: United States
- State: Minnesota
- County: Carlton

Area
  - Total: 35.1 sq mi (90.9 km^{2})
  - Land: 35.1 sq mi (90.8 km^{2})
  - Water: 0.039 sq mi (0.1 km^{2})
- Elevation: 1,145 ft (349 m)

Population (2020)
  - Total: 448
  - Density: 12.8/sq mi (4.93/km^{2})
- Time zone: UTC-6 (Central (CST))
  - Summer (DST): UTC-5 (CDT)
- FIPS code: 27-60232
- GNIS feature ID: 0665610
- Website: https://silvertownshipmn.com/

Silver Township is a township in Carlton County, Minnesota, United States. The population was 448 as of the 2020 census. Silver Township took its name from Silver Creek.

== Geography ==
According to the United States Census Bureau, the township has a total area of 35.1 square miles (90.9 km^{2}), of which 35.0 square miles (90.8 km^{2}) is land and 0.04 square miles (0.1 km^{2}) (0.11%) is water.

The city of Kettle River is located entirely within Silver Township geographically but is a separate entity.

=== Major highways ===
- Minnesota State Highway 27
- Minnesota State Highway 73

=== Adjacent townships ===
- Kalevala Township (north)
- Skelton Township (northeast)
- Moose Lake Township (east)
- Windemere Township, Pine County (southeast)
- Sturgeon Lake Township, Pine County (south)
- Birch Creek Township, Pine County (southwest)
- Split Rock Township (west)
- Automba Township (northwest)

=== Cemeteries ===
The township contains these two cemeteries: Co-op and Holy Trinity.

== Demographics ==
As of the census of 2000, there were 389 people, 148 households, and 111 families residing in the township. The population density was 11.1 people per square mile (4.3/km^{2}). There were 169 housing units at an average density of 4.8/sq mi (1.9/km^{2}). The racial makeup of the township was 97.43% White, 0.26% Native American, and 2.31% from two or more races. Hispanic or Latino of any race were 2.06% of the population.

There were 148 households, out of which 29.1% had children under the age of 18 living with them, 70.3% were married couples living together, 2.7% had a female householder with no husband present, and 25.0% were non-families. 21.6% of all households were made up of individuals, and 6.8% had someone living alone who was 65 years of age or older. The average household size was 2.63 and the average family size was 3.11.

In the township the population was spread out, with 26.2% under the age of 18, 6.2% from 18 to 24, 24.9% from 25 to 44, 30.1% from 45 to 64, and 12.6% who were 65 years of age or older. The median age was 40 years. For every 100 females, there were 104.7 males. For every 100 females age 18 and over, there were 103.5 males.

The median income for a household in the township was $36,833, and the median income for a family was $41,786. Males had a median income of $31,250 versus $26,094 for females. The per capita income for the township was $15,505. About 2.9% of families and 4.9% of the population were below the poverty line, including 5.9% of those under age 18 and none of those age 65 or over.
