= Pliny Township, Aitkin County, Minnesota =

Township in Minnesota, United States

Pliny Township
- Township
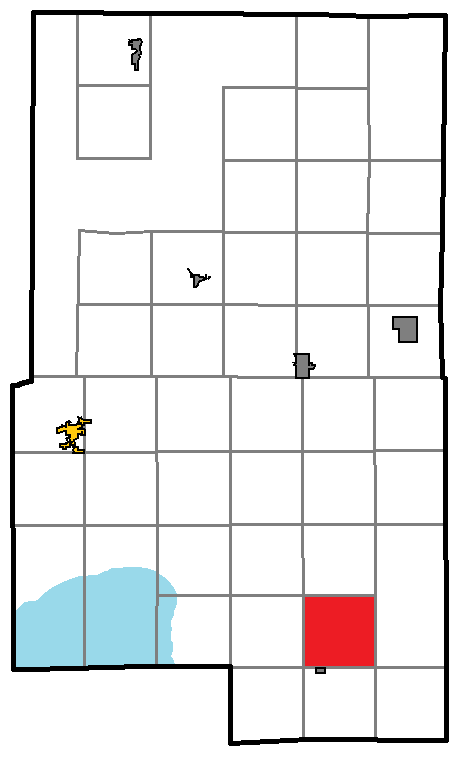
- Location of Pliny Township, within Aitkin County, Minnesota
- Coordinates: 46°16′28″N 93°15′39″W
- Country: United States
- State: Minnesota
- County: Aitkin

Area
  - Total: 36.4 sq mi (94.2 km^{2})
  - Land: 36.3 sq mi (94.0 km^{2})
  - Water: 0.077 sq mi (0.2 km^{2})
- Elevation: 1,260 ft (384 m)

Population (2020)
  - Total: 116
  - Density: 3.20/sq mi (1.23/km^{2})
- Time zone: UTC-6 (Central (CST))
  - Summer (DST): UTC-5 (CDT)
- FIPS code: 27-51694
- GNIS feature ID: 0665326

Pliny Township is a township in Aitkin County, Minnesota, United States. The population was 116 as of the 2020 census.

== History ==
Pliny Township was named for Pliny the Elder.

== Geography ==
According to the United States Census Bureau, the township has a total area of 36.4 square miles (94.2 km^{2}), of which 36.3 square miles (94.0 km^{2}) is land and 0.077 square miles (0.2 km^{2}), or 0.18%, is water.

=== Major highway ===
- Minnesota State Highway 65

=== Adjacent townships ===
- White Pine Township (north)
- Millward Township (east)
- Wagner Township (southeast)
- Williams Township (south)
- Idun Township (southwest)
- Seavey Township (west)

=== Cemeteries ===
The township contains Pliny Cemetery.

== Demographics ==
As of the census of 2000, there were 120 people, 52 households, and 33 families residing in the township. The population density was 3.3 people per square mile (1.3/km^{2}). There were 85 housing units at an average density of 2.3/sq mi (0.9/km^{2}). The racial makeup of the township was 100.00% White. Hispanic or Latino of any race were 0.83% of the population.

There were 52 households, out of which 28.8% had children under the age of 18 living with them, 48.1% were married couples living together, 5.8% had a female householder with no husband present, and 36.5% were non-families. 34.6% of all households were made up of individuals, and 21.2% had someone living alone who was 65 years of age or older. The average household size was 2.31 and the average family size was 2.91.

In the township the population was spread out, with 24.2% under the age of 18, 5.8% from 18 to 24, 28.3% from 25 to 44, 19.2% from 45 to 64, and 22.5% who were 65 years of age or older. The median age was 39 years. For every 100 females, there were 84.6 males. For every 100 females age 18 and over, there were 93.6 males.

The median income for a household in the township was $22,386, and the median income for a family was $28,750. Males had a median income of $22,083 versus $19,750 for females. The per capita income for the township was $11,306. There were 19.2% of families and 19.5% of the population living below the poverty line, including 15.2% of under eighteens and 5.6% of those over 64.
