= Millward Township, Aitkin County, Minnesota =

Township in Minnesota, United States

Millward Township
- Township
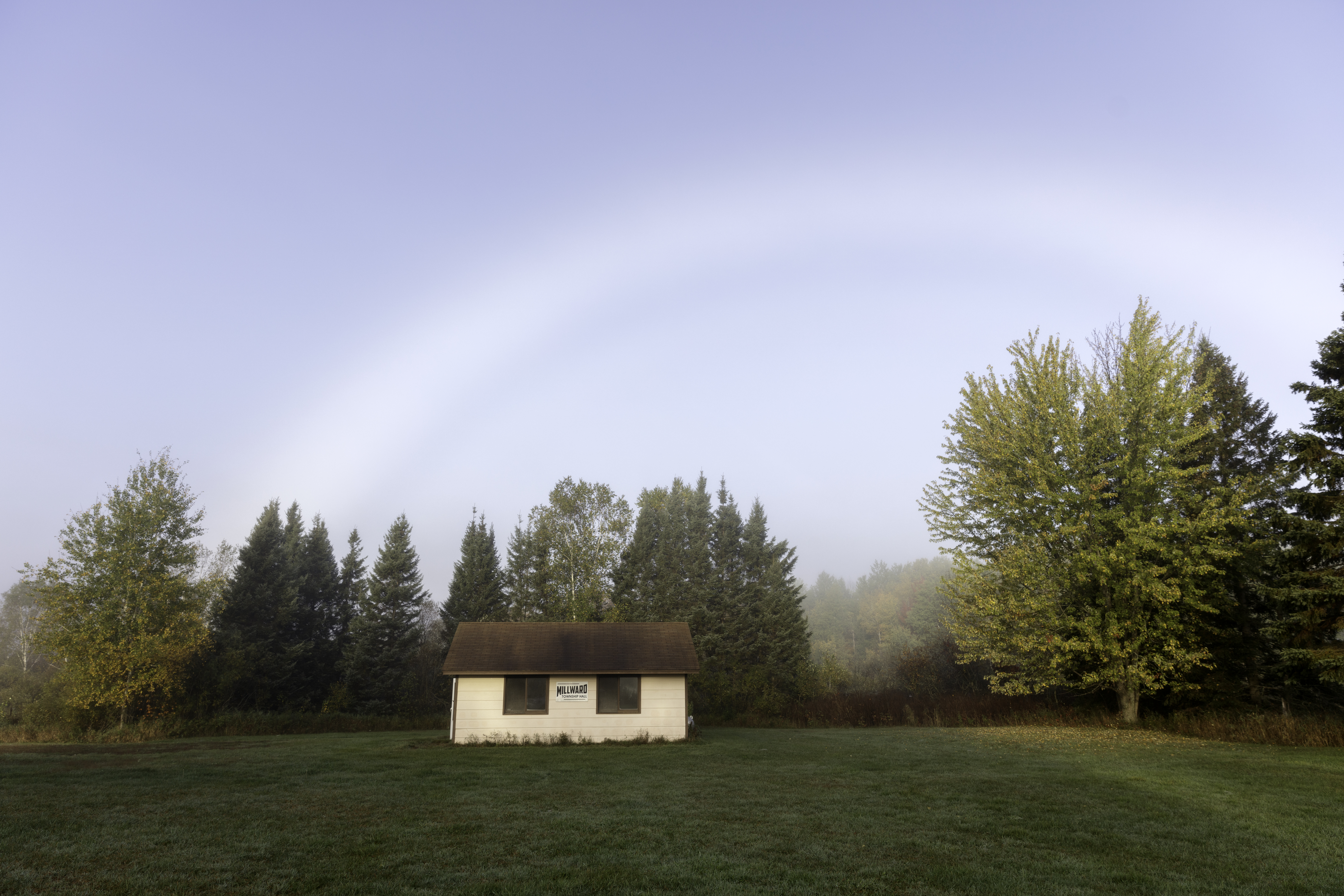
- Millward Township Hall

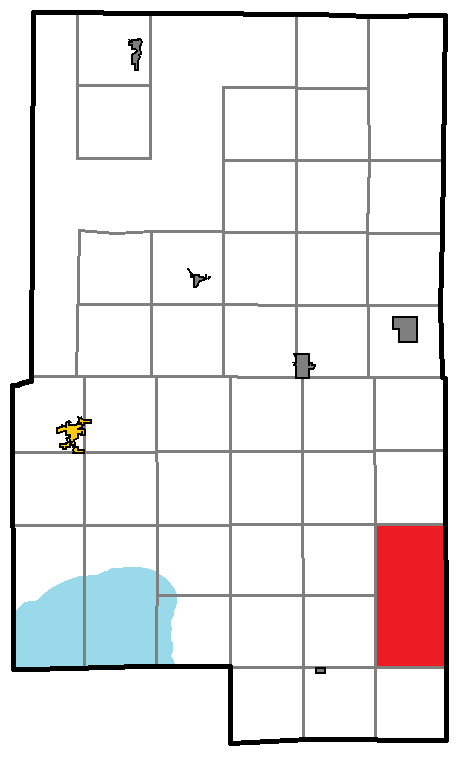
- Location of Millward Township, within Aitkin County, Minnesota
- Coordinates: 46°22′1″N 93°7′39″W
- Country: United States
- State: Minnesota
- County: Aitkin

Area
  - Total: 71.4 sq mi (185.0 km^{2})
  - Land: 71.4 sq mi (184.8 km^{2})
  - Water: 0.039 sq mi (0.1 km^{2})
- Elevation: 1,299 ft (396 m)

Population (2020)
  - Total: 60
  - Density: 0.84/sq mi (0.32/km^{2})
- Time zone: UTC-6 (Central (CST))
  - Summer (DST): UTC-5 (CDT)
- FIPS code: 27-42300
- GNIS feature ID: 0664977

Millward Township is a township in Aitkin County, Minnesota, United States. The population was 60 as of the 2020 census.

== Geography ==
According to the United States Census Bureau, the township has a total area of 71.4 square miles (185.0 km^{2}), of which 71.4 square miles (184.8 km^{2}) is land and 0.039 square miles (0.1 km^{2}), or 0.07%, is water.

=== Lakes ===
- Split Rock Lake

=== Adjacent townships ===
- Beaver Township (north)
- Split Rock Township, Carlton County (northeast)
- Birch Creek Township, Pine County (east)
- Bremen Township, Pine County (east)
- Pine Lake Township, Pine County (southeast)
- Wagner Township (south)
- Williams Township (southwest)
- Pliny Township (west)
- White Pine Township (west)
- Rice River Township (northwest)

== Demographics ==
As of the census of 2000, there were 69 people, 30 households, and 21 families residing in the township. The population density was 1.0 people per square mile (0.4/km^{2}). There were 78 housing units at an average density of 1.1/sq mi (0.4/km^{2}). The racial makeup of the township was 94.20% White, 1.45% Native American and 4.35% Asian.

There were 30 households, out of which 23.3% had children under the age of 18 living with them, 50.0% were married couples living together, 6.7% had a female householder with no husband present, and 30.0% were non-families. 26.7% of all households were made up of individuals, and none had someone living alone who was 65 years of age or older. The average household size was 2.30 and the average family size was 2.67.

In the township the population was spread out, with 23.2% under the age of 18, 2.9% from 18 to 24, 17.4% from 25 to 44, 44.9% from 45 to 64, and 11.6% who were 65 years of age or older. The median age was 50 years. For every 100 females, there were 155.6 males. For every 100 females age 18 and over, there were 130.4 males.

The median income for a household in the township was $21,250, and the median income for a family was $21,875. Males had a median income of $39,375 versus $18,750 for females. The per capita income for the township was $14,060. There were 14.3% of families and 16.7% of the population living below the poverty line, including 83.3% of under eighteens and none of those over 64.
