= Wagner Township, Aitkin County, Minnesota =

Township in Minnesota, United States

Wagner Township
- Township
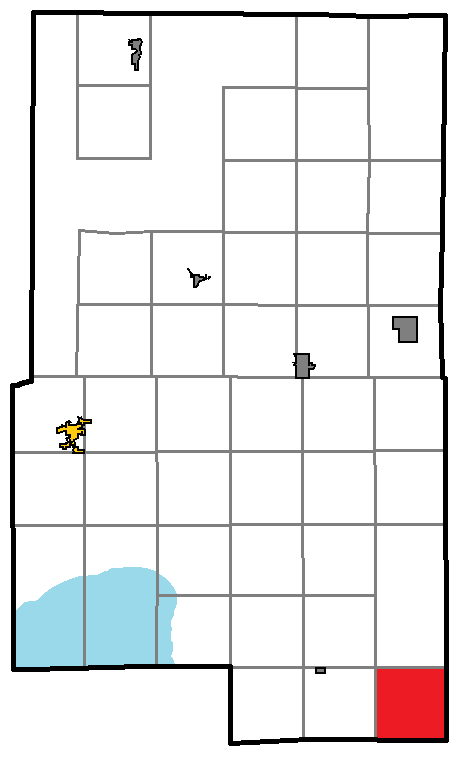
- Location of Wagner Township, within Aitkin County, Minnesota
- Coordinates: 46°12′6″N 93°5′30″W
- Country: United States
- State: Minnesota
- County: Aitkin

Area
  - Total: 35.9 sq mi (92.9 km^{2})
  - Land: 35.0 sq mi (90.7 km^{2})
  - Water: 0.85 sq mi (2.2 km^{2})
- Elevation: 1,210 ft (370 m)

Population (2020)
  - Total: 335
  - Density: 9.57/sq mi (3.69/km^{2})
- Time zone: UTC-6 (Central (CST))
  - Summer (DST): UTC-5 (CDT)
- FIPS code: 27-67540
- GNIS feature ID: 0665891

Wagner Township is a township in Aitkin County, Minnesota, United States. The population was 335 as of the 2020 census.

== Etymology ==
Wagner Township was named for Bessie Wagner, later Bessie Hammond of Montana, an assistant in the Aitkin County register of deeds.

== Geography ==
According to the United States Census Bureau, the township has a total area of 35.9 square miles (92.9 km^{2}), of which 35.0 square miles (90.7 km^{2}) is land and 0.85 square miles (2.2 km^{2}), or 2.37%, is water.

=== Major highway ===
- Minnesota State Highway 18

=== Lakes ===
- Big Pine Lake
- Pine Lake

=== Adjacent townships ===
- Millward Township (north)
- Bremen Township, Pine County (northeast)
- Pine Lake Township, Pine County (east)
- Dell Grove Township, Pine County (southeast)
- Kroschel Township, Kanabec County (south)
- Ford Township, Kanabec County (southwest)
- Williams Township (west)
- Pliny Township (northwest)

=== Cemeteries ===
The township contains these two cemeteries: Immanuel Lutheran and Wagner Township.

== Demographics ==
As of the census of 2000, there were 320 people, 142 households, and 99 families residing in the township. The population density was 9.1 people per square mile (3.5/km^{2}). There were 377 housing units at an average density of 10.8/sq mi (4.2/km^{2}). The racial makeup of the township was 98.75% White, and 1.25% from two or more races. Hispanic or Latino of any race were 0.31% of the population.

There were 142 households, out of which 12.7% had children under the age of 18 living with them, 59.9% were married couples living together, 5.6% had a female householder with no husband present, and 29.6% were non-families. 23.2% of all households were made up of individuals, and 10.6% had someone living alone who was 65 years of age or older. The average household size was 2.25 and the average family size was 2.54.

In the township the population was spread out, with 14.1% under the age of 18, 6.6% from 18 to 24, 18.1% from 25 to 44, 40.0% from 45 to 64, and 21.3% who were 65 years of age or older. The median age was 52 years. For every 100 females, there were 105.1 males. For every 100 females age 18 and over, there were 103.7 males.

The median income for a household in the township was $38,438, and the median income for a family was $41,667. Males had a median income of $21,719 versus $26,458 for females. The per capita income for the township was $18,968. About 9.1% of families and 15.9% of the population were below the poverty line, including 47.1% of those under age 18 and 8.3% of those age 65 or over.
