= Rice River Township, Aitkin County, Minnesota =

Township in Minnesota, United States

Rice River Township
- Township
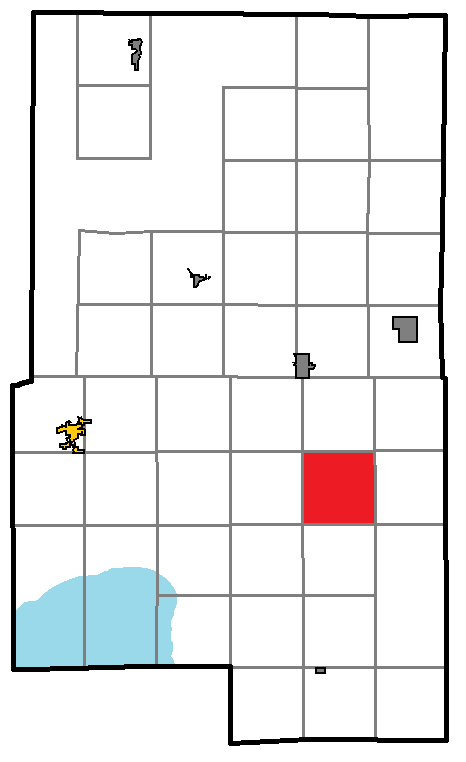
- Location of Rice River Township, within Aitkin County, Minnesota
- Coordinates: 46°28′8″N 93°13′51″W
- Country: United States
- State: Minnesota
- County: Aitkin

Area
  - Total: 36.1 sq mi (93.4 km^{2})
  - Land: 36.1 sq mi (93.4 km^{2})
  - Water: 0 sq mi (0.0 km^{2})
- Elevation: 1,283 ft (391 m)

Population (2020)
  - Total: 120
  - Density: 3.3/sq mi (1.3/km^{2})
- Time zone: UTC-6 (Central (CST))
  - Summer (DST): UTC-5 (CDT)
- ZIP code: 55760
- Area code: 218
- FIPS code: 27-54106
- GNIS feature ID: 0665409

Rice River Township is a township in Aitkin County, Minnesota, United States. The population was 120 as of the 2020 census.

== History ==
Rice River Township takes its name from the Rice River.

== Geography ==
According to the United States Census Bureau, the township has a total area of 36.1 square miles (93.4 km^{2}), all land.

=== Major highway ===
- Minnesota State Highway 65

=== Adjacent townships ===
- Spalding Township (north)
- Salo Township (northeast)
- Beaver Township (east)
- Millward Township (southeast)
- White Pine Township (south)
- Lee Township (west)

=== Cemeteries ===
The township contains Rice River Cemetery.

== Demographics ==
As of the census of 2000, there were 158 people, 64 households, and 44 families residing in the township. The population density was 4.4 people per square mile (1.7/km^{2}). There were 129 housing units at an average density of 3.6/sq mi (1.4/km^{2}). The racial makeup of the township was 99.37% White and 0.63% Asian.

There were 64 households, out of which 31.3% had children under the age of 18 living with them, 60.9% were married couples living together, 4.7% had a female householder with no husband present, and 31.3% were non-families. 29.7% of all households were made up of individuals, and 12.5% had someone living alone who was 65 years of age or older. The average household size was 2.47 and the average family size was 3.11.

In the township the population was spread out, with 26.6% under the age of 18, 6.3% from 18 to 24, 24.1% from 25 to 44, 24.1% from 45 to 64, and 19.0% who were 65 years of age or older. The median age was 41 years. For every 100 females, there were 100.0 males. For every 100 females age 18 and over, there were 107.1 males.

The median income for a household in the township was $28,000, and the median income for a family was $33,281. Males had a median income of $55,313 versus $41,250 for females. The per capita income for the township was $20,205. About 11.1% of families and 13.9% of the population were below the poverty line, including 14.6% of those under the age of eighteen and 4.5% of those 65 or over.
