= Hay Brook Township, Kanabec County, Minnesota =

Hay Brook Township, Minnesota
- Township
- Location within Minnesota and the United States Hay Brook Township (the United States)
- Coordinates: 46°7′5″N 93°21′25″W
- Country: United States
- State: Minnesota
- County: Kanabec

Area
  - Total: 36.4 sq mi (94.4 km^{2})
  - Land: 36.3 sq mi (93.9 km^{2})
  - Water: 0.15 sq mi (0.4 km^{2})
- Elevation: 1,253 ft (382 m)

Population (2000)
  - Total: 218
  - Density: 6.0/sq mi (2.3/km^{2})
- Time zone: UTC-6 (Central (CST))
  - Summer (DST): UTC-5 (CDT)
- FIPS code: 27-27782
- GNIS feature ID: 0664421
- Website: https://www.haybrooktownship.com/

Hay Brook Township is a township in Kanabec County, Minnesota, United States. The population was 218 at the 2000 census.

This township took its name from Hay Creek.

== Geography ==
According to the United States Census Bureau, the township has a total area of 36.4 square miles (94 km^{2}), of which 36.3 square miles (94 km^{2}) is land and 0.2 square miles (0.52 km^{2}) (0.47%) is water.

== Demographics ==
As of the census of 2000, there were 218 people, 80 households, and 61 families residing in the township. The population density was 6.0 inhabitants per square mile (2.3/km^{2}). There were 136 housing units at an average density of 3.7 per square mile (1.4/km^{2}). The racial makeup of the township was 94.95% White, 0.92% African American, 2.29% Native American, and 1.83% from two or more races. Hispanic or Latino of any race were 0.92% of the population.

There were 80 households, out of which 36.3% had children under the age of 18 living with them, 70.0% were married couples living together, 5.0% had a female householder with no husband present, and 23.8% were non-families. 21.3% of all households were made up of individuals, and 7.5% had someone living alone who was 65 years of age or older. The average household size was 2.73 and the average family size was 3.15.

In the township the population was spread out, with 32.6% under the age of 18, 2.8% from 18 to 24, 25.7% from 25 to 44, 25.7% from 45 to 64, and 13.3% who were 65 years of age or older. The median age was 38 years. For every 100 females, there were 92.9 males. For every 100 females age 18 and over, there were 93.4 males.

The median income for a household in the township was $33,542, and the median income for a family was $41,667. Males had a median income of $24,167 versus $21,250 for females. The per capita income for the township was $14,696. About 15.3% of families and 15.7% of the population were below the poverty line, including 18.5% of those under the age of eighteen and 23.8% of those 65 or over.
