= Beaver Township, Aitkin County, Minnesota =

Township in Minnesota, United States

Beaver Township
- Township
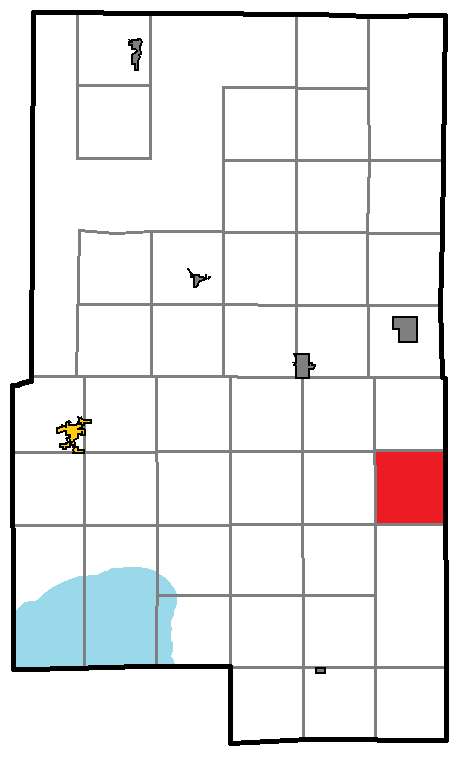
- Location of Beaver Township within Aitkin County, Minnesota
- Coordinates: 46°26′17″N 93°8′27″W
- Country: United States
- State: Minnesota
- County: Aitkin

Area
  - Total: 35.3 sq mi (91.4 km^{2})
  - Land: 35.3 sq mi (91.4 km^{2})
  - Water: 0 sq mi (0.0 km^{2})
- Elevation: 1,335 ft (407 m)

Population (2020)
  - Total: 62
  - Density: 1.8/sq mi (0.68/km^{2})
- Time zone: UTC-6 (Central (CST))
  - Summer (DST): UTC-5 (CDT)
- FIPS code: 27-04384
- GNIS feature ID: 0663536

Beaver Township is a township in Aitkin County, Minnesota, United States. The population was 62 as of the 2020 census.

== Geography ==
According to the United States Census Bureau, the township has a total area of 35.3 square miles (91.4 km^{2}), all land.

=== Adjacent townships ===
- Salo Township (north)
- Automba Township, Carlton County (northeast)
- Split Rock Township, Carlton County (east)
- Birch Creek Township, Pine County (southeast)
- Millward Township (south)
- White Pine Township (southwest)
- Rice River Township (west)
- Spalding Township (northwest)

=== Cemeteries ===
The township contains Beaver Cemetery.

== Demographics ==
As of the census of 2000, there were 76 people, 34 households, and 19 families residing in the township. The population density was 2.2 inhabitants per square mile (0.85/km^{2}). There were 109 housing units at an average density of 3.1 per square mile (1.2/km^{2}). The racial makeup of the township was 96.05% White, 2.63% Native American, and 1.32% from two or more races.

There were 34 households, out of which 26.5% had children under the age of 18 living with them, 50.0% were married couples living together, and 44.1% were non-families. 35.3% of all households were made up of individuals, and 14.7% had someone living alone who was 65 years of age or older. The average household size was 2.24 and the average family size was 2.89.

In the township the population was spread out, with 22.4% under the age of 18, 6.6% from 18 to 24, 22.4% from 25 to 44, 34.2% from 45 to 64, and 14.5% who were 65 years of age or older. The median age was 44 years. For every 100 females, there were 111.1 males. For every 100 females age 18 and over, there were 96.7 males.

The median income for a household in the township was $30,000, and the median income for a family was $32,500. Males had a median income of $20,000 versus $33,750 for females. The per capita income for the township was $15,039. There were no families and 10.3% of the population living below the poverty line, including no under eighteens and 50.0% of those over 64.
