= Spalding Township, Aitkin County, Minnesota =

Township in Minnesota, United States

Spalding Township
- Township
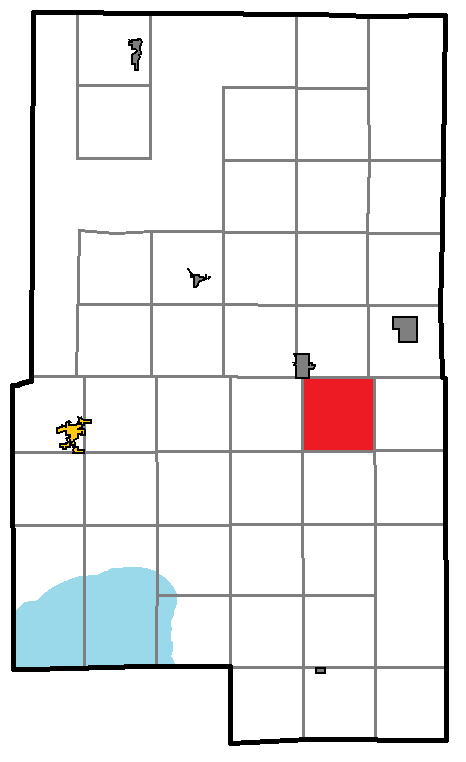
- Location of Spalding Township, within Aitkin County, Minnesota
- Coordinates: 46°32′27″N 93°15′25″W
- Country: United States
- State: Minnesota
- County: Aitkin

Area
  - Total: 37.2 sq mi (96.3 km^{2})
  - Land: 36.8 sq mi (95.4 km^{2})
  - Water: 0.35 sq mi (0.9 km^{2})
- Elevation: 1,289 ft (393 m)

Population (2020)
  - Total: 320
  - Density: 8.7/sq mi (3.4/km^{2})
- Time zone: UTC-6 (Central (CST))
  - Summer (DST): UTC-5 (CDT)
- ZIP code: 55760
- Area code: 218
- FIPS code: 27-61546
- GNIS feature ID: 0665658

Spalding Township is a township in Aitkin County, Minnesota, United States. The population was 320 as of the 2020 census.

== History ==
Spalding Township was named for John L. Spalding, a county official.

== Geography ==
According to the United States Census Bureau, the township has a total area of 37.2 square miles (96.3 km^{2}), of which 36.8 square miles (95.4 km^{2}) is land and 0.35 square miles (0.9 km^{2}), or 0.91%, is water.

The city of McGregor lies within the township but is a separate entity.

=== Major highway ===
- Minnesota State Highway 65

=== Lakes ===
- Little Sheriff Lake
- Lost Lake
- Sheriff Lake
- Starvation Lake

=== Adjacent townships ===
- McGregor Township (north)
- Clark Township (northeast)
- Salo Township (east)
- Beaver Township (southeast)
- Rice River Township (south)
- Lee Township (southwest)

=== Cemeteries ===
The township contains Sheriff Lake Cemetery.

== Demographics ==
As of the census of 2000, there were 237 people, 86 households, and 65 families residing in the township. The population density was 6.4 people per square mile (2.5/km^{2}). There were 156 housing units at an average density of 4.2/sq mi (1.6/km^{2}). The racial makeup of the township was 54.01% White, 42.62% Native American, 0.42% Asian, and 2.95% from two or more races. Hispanic or Latino of any race were 0.84% of the population.

There were 86 households, out of which 37.2% had children under the age of 18 living with them, 47.7% were married couples living together, 22.1% had a female householder with no husband present, and 23.3% were non-families. 22.1% of all households were made up of individuals, and 10.5% had someone living alone who was 65 years of age or older. The average household size was 2.76 and the average family size was 3.14.

In the township the population was spread out, with 34.6% under the age of 18, 8.4% from 18 to 24, 22.4% from 25 to 44, 21.1% from 45 to 64, and 13.5% who were 65 years of age or older. The median age was 31 years. For every 100 females, there were 88.1 males. For every 100 females age 18 and over, there were 80.2 males.

The median income for a household in the township was $24,000, and the median income for a family was $25,000. Males had a median income of $31,806 versus $15,893 for females. The per capita income for the township was $10,260. About 26.6% of families and 32.9% of the population were below the poverty line, including 50.0% of those under the age of eighteen and 12.9% of those 65 or over.
