= Salo Township, Aitkin County, Minnesota =

Township in Minnesota, United States

Salo Township
- Township
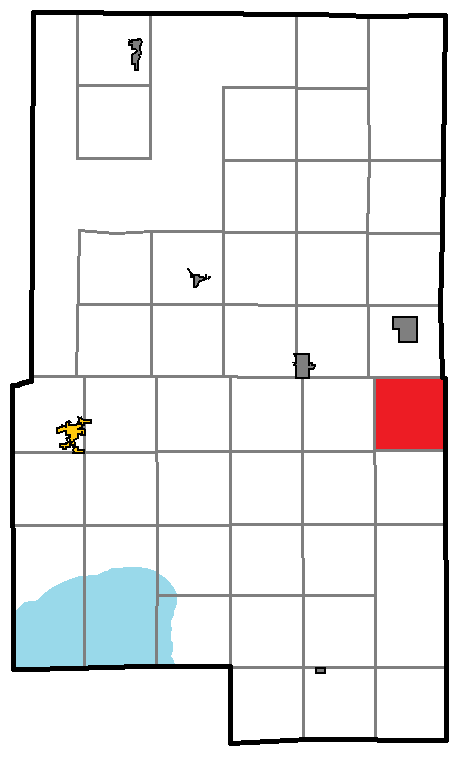
- Location of Salo Township, within Aitkin County, Minnesota
- Coordinates: 46°32′37″N 93°9′59″W
- Country: United States
- State: Minnesota
- County: Aitkin

Area
  - Total: 35.6 sq mi (92.2 km^{2})
  - Land: 35.5 sq mi (91.9 km^{2})
  - Water: 0.12 sq mi (0.3 km^{2})
- Elevation: 1,309 ft (399 m)

Population (2020)
  - Total: 85
  - Density: 2.4/sq mi (0.92/km^{2})
- Time zone: UTC-6 (Central (CST))
  - Summer (DST): UTC-5 (CDT)
- ZIP code: 55760
- Area code: 218
- FIPS code: 27-58270
- GNIS feature ID: 0665539

Salo Township is a township in Aitkin County, Minnesota, United States. The population was 85 as of the 2020 census.

== Etymology ==
Established by Finnish settlers, Salo Township was named after Salo, Finland.

== Geography ==
According to the United States Census Bureau, the township has a total area of 35.6 square miles (92.2 km^{2}), of which 35.5 square miles (91.9 km^{2}) is land and 0.12 square miles (0.3 km^{2}), or 0.35%, is water.

=== Lakes ===
- Dutch Lake
- Rice Lake (south edge)
- Sandabacka Lake

=== Adjacent townships ===
- Clark Township (north)
- Lakeview Township, Carlton County (northeast)
- Automba Township, Carlton County (east)
- Split Rock Township, Carlton County (southeast)
- Beaver Township (south)
- Rice River Township (southwest)
- Spalding Township (west)

=== Cemeteries ===
The township contains the following cemeteries: Finnish Apostolic and Salo.

== Demographics ==
As of the census of 2000, there were 119 people, 48 households, and 30 families residing in the township. The population density was 3.4 people per square mile (1.3/km^{2}). There were 91 housing units at an average density of 2.6/sq mi (1.0/km^{2}). The racial makeup of the township was 100% White.

There were 48 households, out of which 18.8% had children under the age of 18 living with them, 47.9% were married couples living together, 8.3% had a female householder with no husband present, and 37.5% were non-families. 33.3% of all households were made up of individuals, and 12.5% had someone living alone who was 65 years of age or older. The average household size was 2.48 and the average family size was 3.20.

In the township the population was spread out, with 19.3% under the age of 18, 7.6% from 18 to 24, 22.7% from 25 to 44, 33.6% from 45 to 64, and 16.8% who were 65 years of age or older. The median age was 46 years. For every 100 females, there were 112.5 males. For every 100 females age 18 and over, there were 123.3 males.

The median income for a household in the township was $23,542, and the median income for a family was $27,500. Males had a median income of $40,417 versus $0 for females. The per capita income for the township was $16,047. There were no families and 5.4% of the population living below the poverty line, including no under eighteens and 10.0% of those over 64.
