= National Register of Historic Places listings in Aitkin County, Minnesota =

Location of Aitkin County in Minnesota

This is a list of the National Register of Historic Places listings in Aitkin County, Minnesota.

This is intended to be a complete list of the properties and districts on the National Register of Historic Places in Aitkin County, Minnesota, United States. The locations of National Register properties and districts for which the latitude and longitude coordinates are included below, may be seen in an online map.

There are 12 properties and districts listed on the National Register in the county.

This National Park Service list is complete through NPS recent listings posted April 24, 2026.

== Current listings ==
	Name on the Register	Image	Date listed	Location	City or town	Description
1	Aitkin Carnegie Library	Aitkin Carnegie Library	April 16, 1982 (#82002924)	121 2nd St., NW. 46°31′59″N 93°42′34″W	Aitkin	Well-preserved example of a Carnegie library—built 1911—and a prominent local example of Neoclassical architecture.
2	Aitkin County Courthouse and Jail	Aitkin County Courthouse and Jail	April 16, 1982 (#82002923)	209 and 217 2nd St., NW. 46°31′59″N 93°42′37″W	Aitkin	Long-serving seat of Aitkin County government, consisting of a 1915 jail and a 1920 courthouse, the latter exemplifying the second-generation Beaux-Arts courthouses built around Minnesota in the early 20th century.
3	Andy Gibson (shipwreck)	Andy Gibson (shipwreck)	August 28, 2012 (#12000558)	Mississippi River, 0.75 miles (1.21 km) downstream from County Highway 1 Bridge; 46°32′25″N 93°43′01″W	Aitkin	Rare and well-preserved remains of a Mississippi River steamboat, launched in 1884 to serve the headwaters region. Unique among U.S. shipwrecks for still resting on its 1894 drydock cradle.
4	Arthyde Stone House	Arthyde Stone House	April 16, 1982 (#82002930)	County Road 27; 46°21′16″N 93°05′22″W	Arthyde	Fieldstone bungalow built circa 1922 in a short-lived settlement, a locally prominent reminder of the failed townsite speculation common to northern Minnesota's cutover land during the Roaring Twenties.
5	Bethlehem Lutheran Church	Bethlehem Lutheran Church	April 16, 1982 (#82002928)	Off County Highway 12; 46°28′34″N 93°37′00″W	Aitkin	1897 church representative of the Swedish American population that predominated in southwest Aitkin County.
6	Patrick Casey House	Patrick Casey House	April 16, 1982 (#82002925)	4th St., SE. and 2nd Ave. 46°31′36″N 93°42′13″W	Aitkin	1901 Queen Anne/Classical Revival house of a prominent local businessman (1849–1910) behind the Potter/Casey Company. Also one of northern Minnesota's few architecturally distinctive residences outside of Duluth and the Iron Range cities.
7	Malmo Mounds and Village Site	Malmo Mounds and Village Site	April 3, 1975 (#75000974)	Northwestern quarter of Section 32, Township 45 North, Range 25 West; 46°20′48″N 93°31′57″W	McGrath	Village site and some 72 mounds dating to the early Middle Woodland Period, the type site and best preserved assemblage of the region's distinct Malmo Phase.
8	National Woodenware Company Superintendent's Residence	National Woodenware Company Superintendent's Residence	April 16, 1982 (#82002929)	252 Ione Ave. NE. 46°59′35″N 93°35′40″W	Hill City	1910 manager's housing, chief remnant of an Armour and Company subsidiary that was Hill City's principal employer and developer 1910–1928.
9	Northern Pacific Depot	Northern Pacific Depot	April 16, 1982 (#82002926)	20 Pacific St., SW. 46°31′54″N 93°42′28″W	Aitkin	Railway station built 1915–16, symbolizing the importance of the railroad in Aitkin's founding and development. Now a museum.
10	Pine-Hickory Lakes Roadside Parking Area	Pine-Hickory Lakes Roadside Parking Area	May 23, 2016 (#16000276)	US 169, .25 mi. N. of 249th Ln. 46°26′38″N 93°44′17″W	Aitkin	Roadside park built 1937–38, a large example of the state's early highway waysides developed during the New Deal. Also noted for its National Park Service rustic design.
11	Potter/Casey Company Building	Potter/Casey Company Building	April 16, 1982 (#82002927)	E. Minnesota Ave. between 1st and 2nd Sts., NW. 46°31′58″N 93°42′23″W	Aitkin	1902 commercial building constructed for Aitkin County's leading mercantile business.
12	Savanna Portage	Savanna Portage	April 23, 1973 (#73000963)	Off County Highway 5 in Savanna Portage State Park; 46°49′42″N 93°10′32″W	McGregor	Difficult but vital six-mile (9.7 km) portage linking the Great Lakes and Mississippi basins, blazed by Native Americans and used into the fur trade and early settlement eras.

== See also ==
- List of National Historic Landmarks in Minnesota
- National Register of Historic Places listings in Minnesota
