= Casey House =

Casey House or variations such as Casey Farm may refer to:

in Canada

- Casey House (Toronto, Ontario) a hospice for people with AIDS

in the United States

- Casey House (Mountain Home, Arkansas), listed on the National Register of Historic Places (NRHP)
- Patrick Casey House, Aitkin, Minnesota, listed on the NRHP
- Silas Casey Farm, North Kingstown, Rhode Island, listed on the NRHP
- Casey House (Georgetown, Texas), listed on the NRHP in Texas
