= Farm Island Township, Aitkin County, Minnesota =

Township in Minnesota, United States

Farm Island Township
- Township
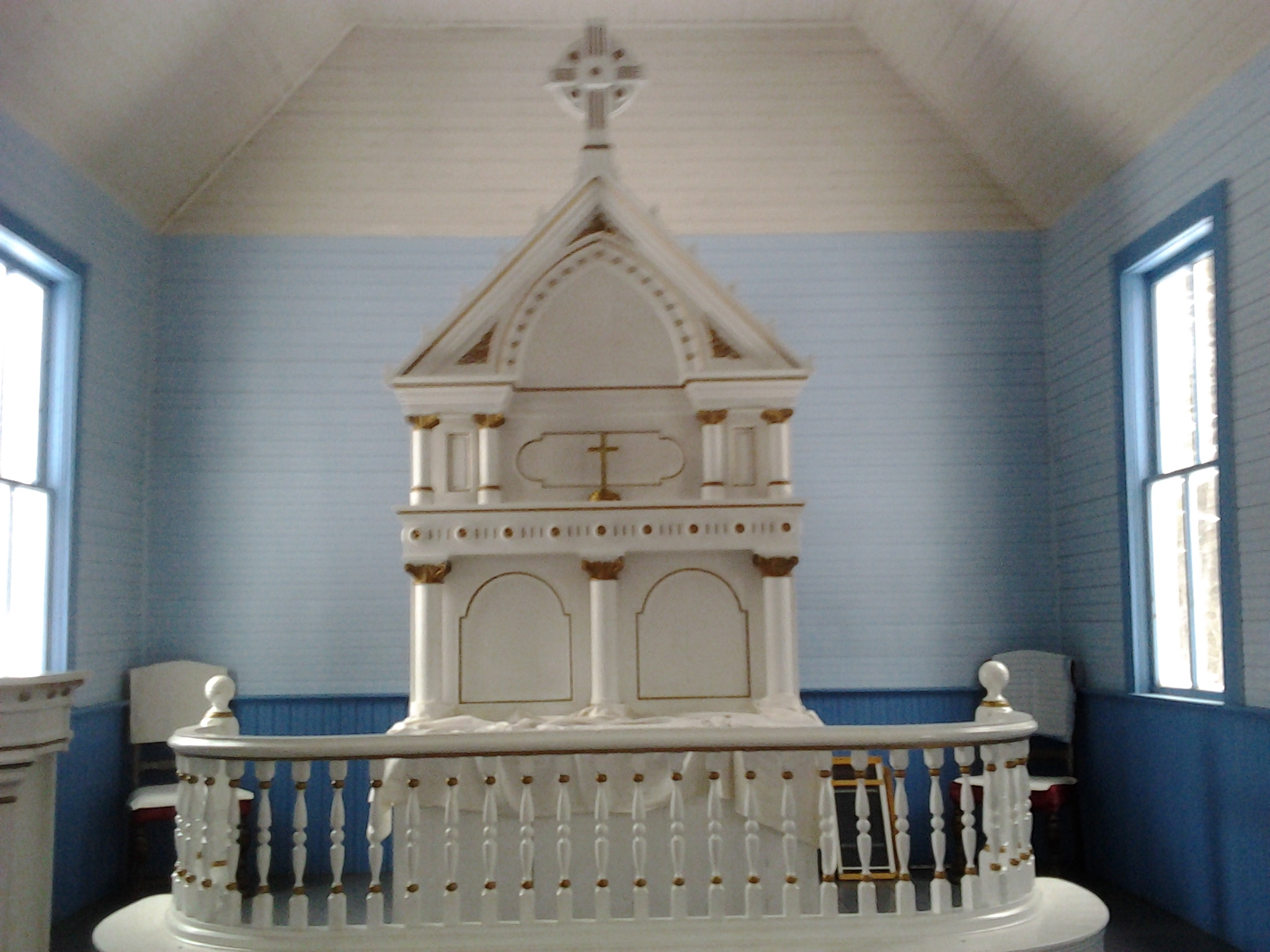
- Dorris Church altar

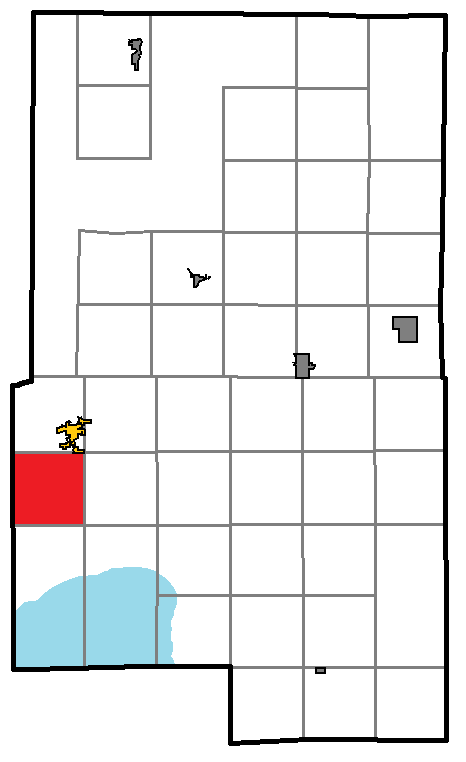
- Location of Farm Island Township, within Aitkin County, Minnesota
- Coordinates: 46°26′58″N 93°44′16″W
- Country: United States
- State: Minnesota
- County: Aitkin

Area
  - Total: 35.7 sq mi (92.5 km^{2})
  - Land: 28.4 sq mi (73.5 km^{2})
  - Water: 7.3 sq mi (19.0 km^{2})
- Elevation: 1,257 ft (383 m)

Population (2020)
  - Total: 995
  - Density: 35.1/sq mi (13.5/km^{2})
- Time zone: UTC-6 (Central (CST))
  - Summer (DST): UTC-5 (CDT)
- FIPS code: 27-20654
- GNIS feature ID: 0664148

Farm Island Township is a township in Aitkin County, Minnesota, United States. The population was 995 as of the 2020 census.

== Etymology ==
Farm Island takes its name from a lake island of the same name, which was cultivated by the Ojibwe people.

== History ==
During the period 1896–1912, the community was served by a post office named Dorris. The community is still referred to by some as Dorris. The historic Cedar Lake Lutheran Church and adjacent cemetery are both locally referred to by the name Dorris. Early immigrants in the area include the Roms (Carlsons), Dummers, Rudes (Ruds) and Petersons. In 2006 the Rom Poultry Farm ended their egg business. Much of the land was originally transferred to the railroad, and subsequently sold to settlers. The terrain reminded the surveyors of Switzerland, and so named the Switzerland Trail (now Township Road 96).

The township's Pine-Hickory Lakes Roadside Parking Area was developed as a New Deal project from 1937 to 1938 and has been listed on the National Register of Historic Places.

== Geography ==
According to the United States Census Bureau, the township has a total area of 35.7 square miles (92.5 km^{2}), of which 28.4 square miles (73.5 km^{2}) is land and 7.3 square miles (19.0 km^{2}), or 20.54%, is water. The terrain of the township contrasts with much of Aitkin County.

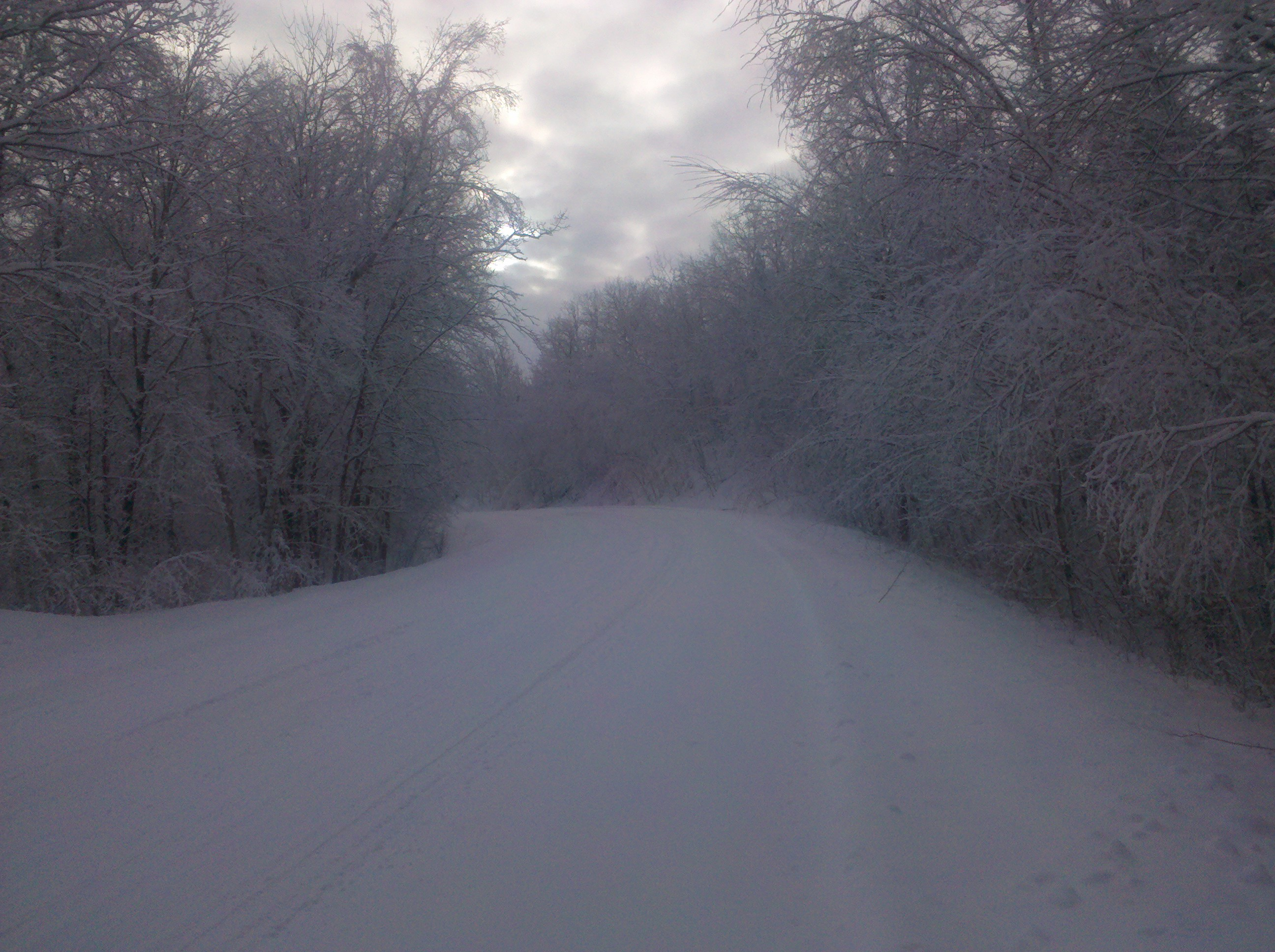
Switzerland Trail in January

=== Major highway ===
- U.S. Highway 169

=== Lakes ===
- Anderson Lake
- Apple Lake
- Bachelor Lake
- Black Shadow Lake
- Blue Lake (south three-quarters)
- Brennen Lake
- Camp Lake
- Carlson Lake
- Cedar Lake (southeast half)
- Christmas Lake
- Diamond Lake
- Drain Lake
- Dummer Lake
- Farm Island Lake (north three-quarters)
- Hammal Lake
- Hanging Kettle Lake
- Hickory Lake
- Hill Lake
- Horseshoe Lake
- Landgren Lake
- Little Pete Lake
- Little Pine Lake
- Lake Four
- Lake Three
- Long Lake
- Pine Island Lake
- Prescott Lake
- Ripple Lake (west edge)
- Round Lake
- Seth Lake (west edge)
- Spirit Lake
- Sunset Lake
- Taylor Lake
- Thornton Lake
- Town Line Lake
- Townhall Lake
- Vorse Lake

=== Adjacent townships ===
- Aitkin Township (north)
- Spencer Township (northeast)
- Nordland Township (east)
- Wealthwood Township (southeast)
- Hazelton Township (south)
- Bay Lake Township, Crow Wing County (southwest)
- Deerwood Township, Crow Wing County (west)
- Rabbit Lake Township, Crow Wing County (northwest)

=== Cemeteries ===
The township contains these two cemeteries: Diamond Lake and Dorris.

== Demographics ==
As of the census of 2000, there were 1,071 people, 434 households, and 335 families residing in the township. The population density was 38.2 inhabitants per square mile (14.7/km^{2}). There were 1,116 housing units at an average density of 39.8 per square mile (15.4/km^{2}). The racial makeup of the township was 98.04% White, 0.28% African American, 0.28% Native American, 0.09% Asian, 0.56% from other races, and 0.75% from two or more races. Hispanic or Latino of any race were 0.19% of the population.

There were 434 households, out of which 25.6% had children under the age of 18 living with them, 71.4% were married couples living together, 3.5% had a female householder with no husband present, and 22.8% were non-families. 19.1% of all households were made up of individuals, and 9.0% had someone living alone who was 65 years of age or older. The average household size was 2.47 and the average family size was 2.79.

In the township the population was spread out, with 21.5% under the age of 18, 5.5% from 18 to 24, 20.4% from 25 to 44, 32.9% from 45 to 64, and 19.7% who were 65 years of age or older. The median age was 47 years. For every 100 females, there were 108.0 males. For every 100 females age 18 and over, there were 107.7 males.

The median income for a household in the township was $60,882, and the median income for a family was $74,375. Males had a median income of $64,000 versus $40,673 for females. The per capita income for the township was $30,067. About 6.6% of families and 7.0% of the population were below the poverty line, including 8.7% of those under age 18 and 14.1% of those age 65 or over.
