= Arthyde Stone House =

Historic house in Minnesota, United States

- U.S. National Register of Historic Places
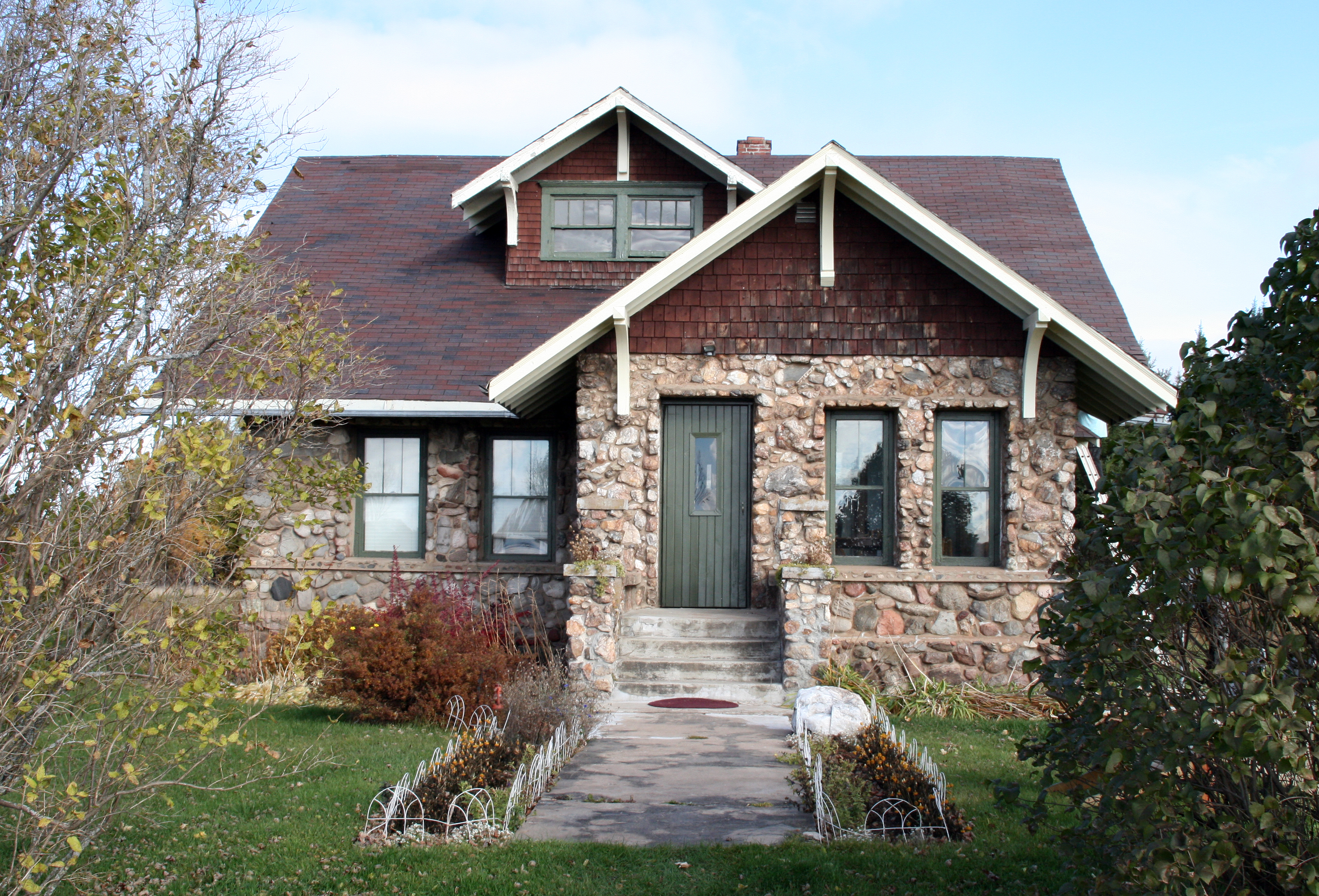
- The Arthyde Stone House from the south

- Location within Minnesota Location within the United States
- Location: County Road 27, Arthyde, Minnesota
- Coordinates: 46°21′16″N 93°5′22″W
- Area: Less than one acre
- Built: c. 1922
- Architect: Henry Senn, Fritz Slathar
- MPS: Aitkin County MRA
- NRHP reference No.: 82002930
- Designated: April 16, 1982

Arthyde Stone House is a historic bungalow in the former community of Arthyde, Minnesota, United States. It was built circa 1922 using local fieldstone. The Arthyde Stone House was listed on the National Register of Historic Places in 1982 for having local significance in the theme of exploration/settlement. It was nominated for being a locally prominent reminder of the failed townsite speculation common to northern Minnesota's cutover land during the Roaring Twenties.

== See also ==
- National Register of Historic Places listings in Aitkin County, Minnesota
