= Andy Gibson (steamboat) =

- Andy Gibson (shipwreck)
- U.S. National Register of Historic Places
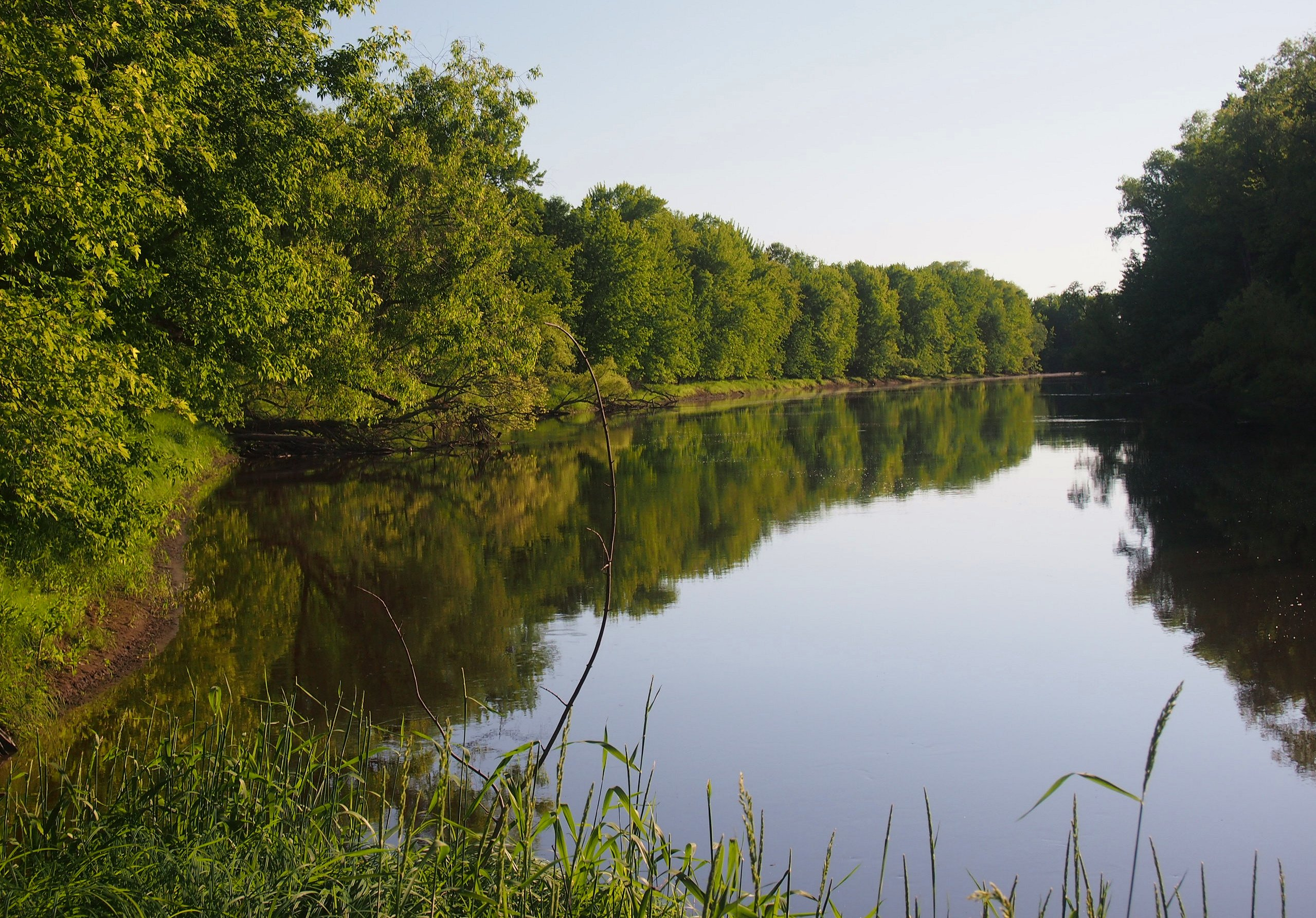
- Vicinity of the Andy Gibson shipwreck

- Location within Minnesota Location within the United States
- Location: Mississippi River, 0.75 miles (1.21 km) downstream from County Highway 1 Bridge, Aitkin Township, Minnesota
- Coordinates: 46°32′25″N 93°43′01″W
- Area: Less than one acre
- Built: 1884
- Architect: Fred W. Bonness, et al.
- MPS: Shipwrecks of Minnesota's Inland Lakes and Rivers MPS
- NRHP reference No.: 12000558
- Designated: August 28, 2012

The Andy Gibson was a steamboat that serviced the headwaters of the Mississippi River in the U.S. state of Minnesota from 1884 to 1894. After her retirement, the ship was left in a drydock outside her home port of Aitkin, Minnesota, and gradually dismantled for parts. The hull and drydock eventually sank out of sight. It is thus unique among U.S. shipwrecks for still resting on a drydock cradle. The Andy Gibson shipwreck (Smithsonian trinomial 21AK109) was listed on the National Register of Historic Places in 2012 for having state-level significance in the themes of commerce, engineering, entertainment/recreation, maritime history, non-aboriginal historic archaeology, and transportation. It was nominated for comprising the rare and well-preserved remains of a Mississippi River steamboat.

== See also ==
- National Register of Historic Places listings in Aitkin County, Minnesota
