= National Woodenware Company Superintendent's Residence =

Historic house in Minnesota, United States

- U.S. National Register of Historic Places
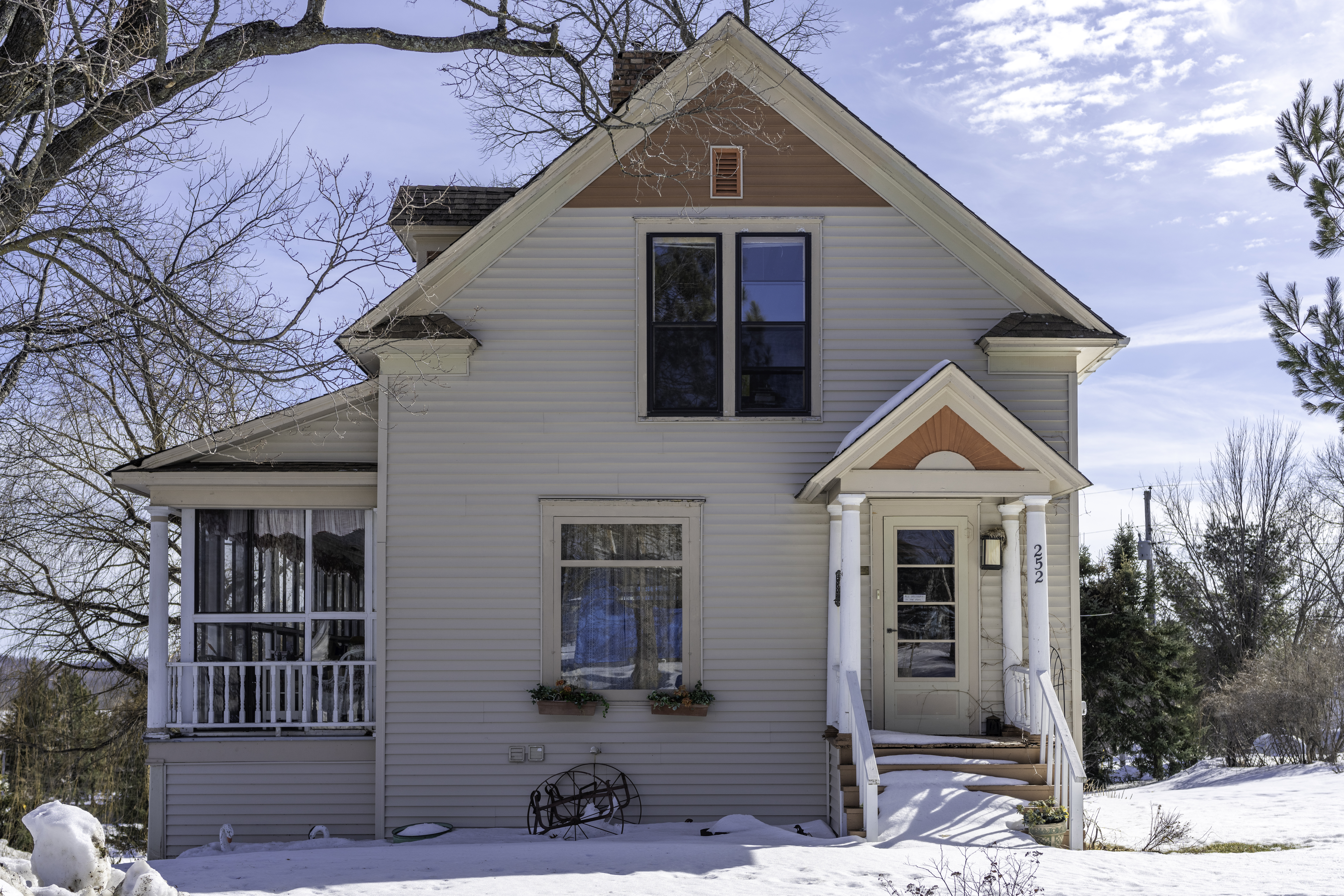

- Location within Minnesota Location within the United States
- Location: 252 Ione Avenue NE; Hill City, Minnesota
- Coordinates: 46°59′34.5″N 93°35′40″W
- Area: Less than one acre
- Built: 1910
- MPS: Aitkin County MRA
- NRHP reference No.: 82002929
- Designated: April 16, 1982

The National Woodenware Company Superintendent's Residence is a historic house in Hill City, Minnesota, United States. It was built in 1910 as housing for the local manager of a manufacturing plant that produced wooden buckets and tubs for Armour and Company. The National Woodenware Company relocated to Hill City from Ithaca, Michigan, in 1910, purchasing a third of the town's lots, constructing residences for its employees, and tripling the population. The Superintendent's Residence was listed on the National Register of Historic Places in 1982 for having local significance in the themes of exploration/settlement and industry. It was nominated for being the most prominent reminder of Hill City's principal employer and developer in the early 20th century.

== See also ==
- National Register of Historic Places listings in Aitkin County, Minnesota
