= Bethlehem Lutheran Church (Aitkin, Minnesota) =

Historic church in Minnesota, United States

- U.S. National Register of Historic Places
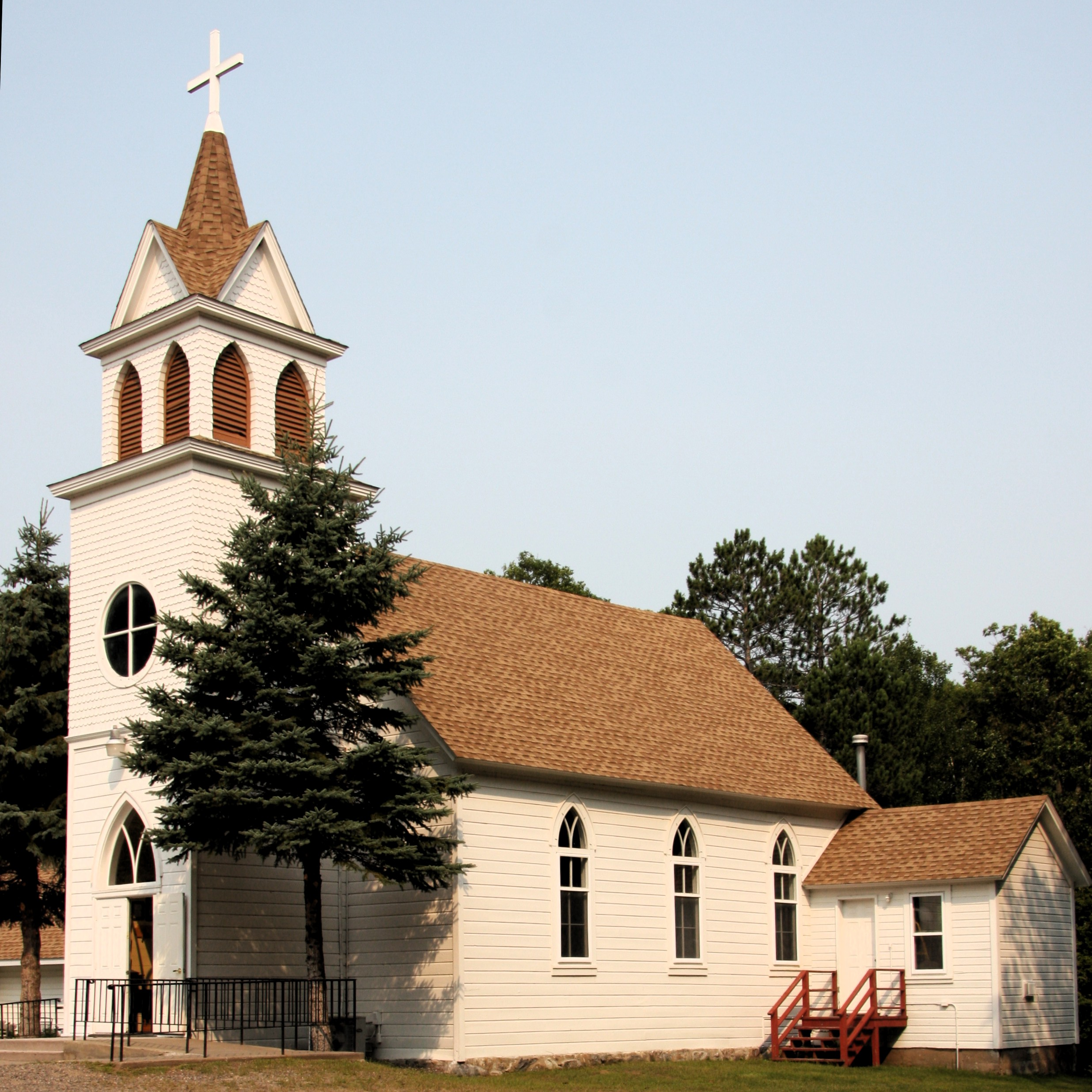

- Location within Minnesota Location within the United States
- Nearest city: Aitkin, Minnesota
- Coordinates: 46°28′33.7″N 93°36′59.8″W
- Area: 3 acres (1.2 ha)
- Built: 1897
- MPS: Aitkin County MRA
- NRHP reference No.: 82002928
- Added to NRHP: April 16, 1982

Bethlehem Lutheran Church (also known as Swedish Evangelical Lutheran Bethlehem Church) is a historic Lutheran church in Nordland Township, Minnesota, United States. The church was constructed in 1897 by Swedish immigrants. The Gothic Revival building features a square tower topped by a belfry and an octagonal spire. The church's congregation formed in 1891 and was the second of five Swedish Lutheran churches established in the county. Aitkin County received a large influx of Swedish immigrants in the late 1800s, and the church is one of the best-preserved buildings constructed by the immigrant population upon their arrival.

The church was added to the National Register of Historic Places in 1982.

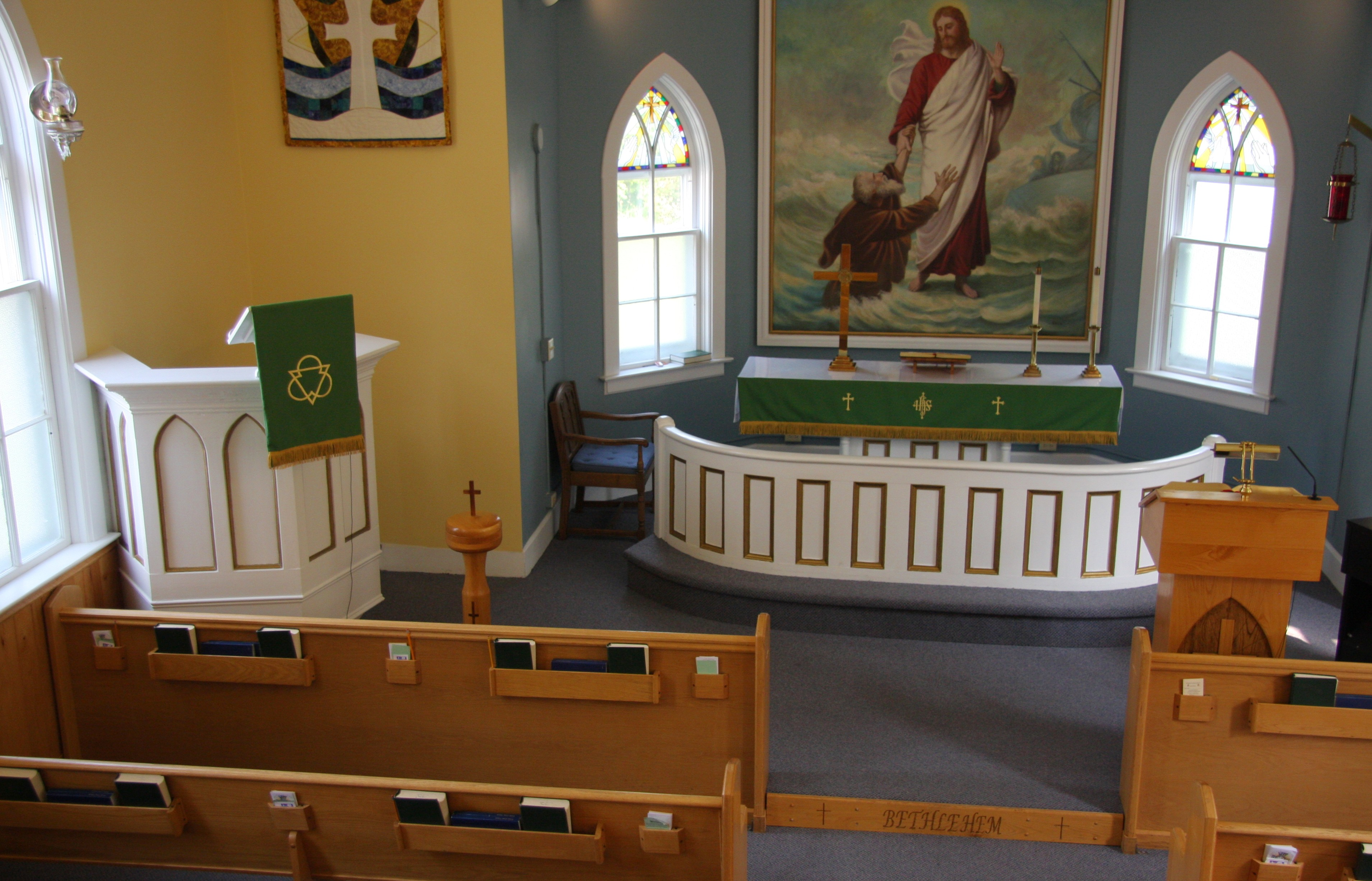
Church interior

== See also ==
- National Register of Historic Places listings in Aitkin County, Minnesota
