= Patrick Casey House =

Historic house in Minnesota, United States

- U.S. National Register of Historic Places
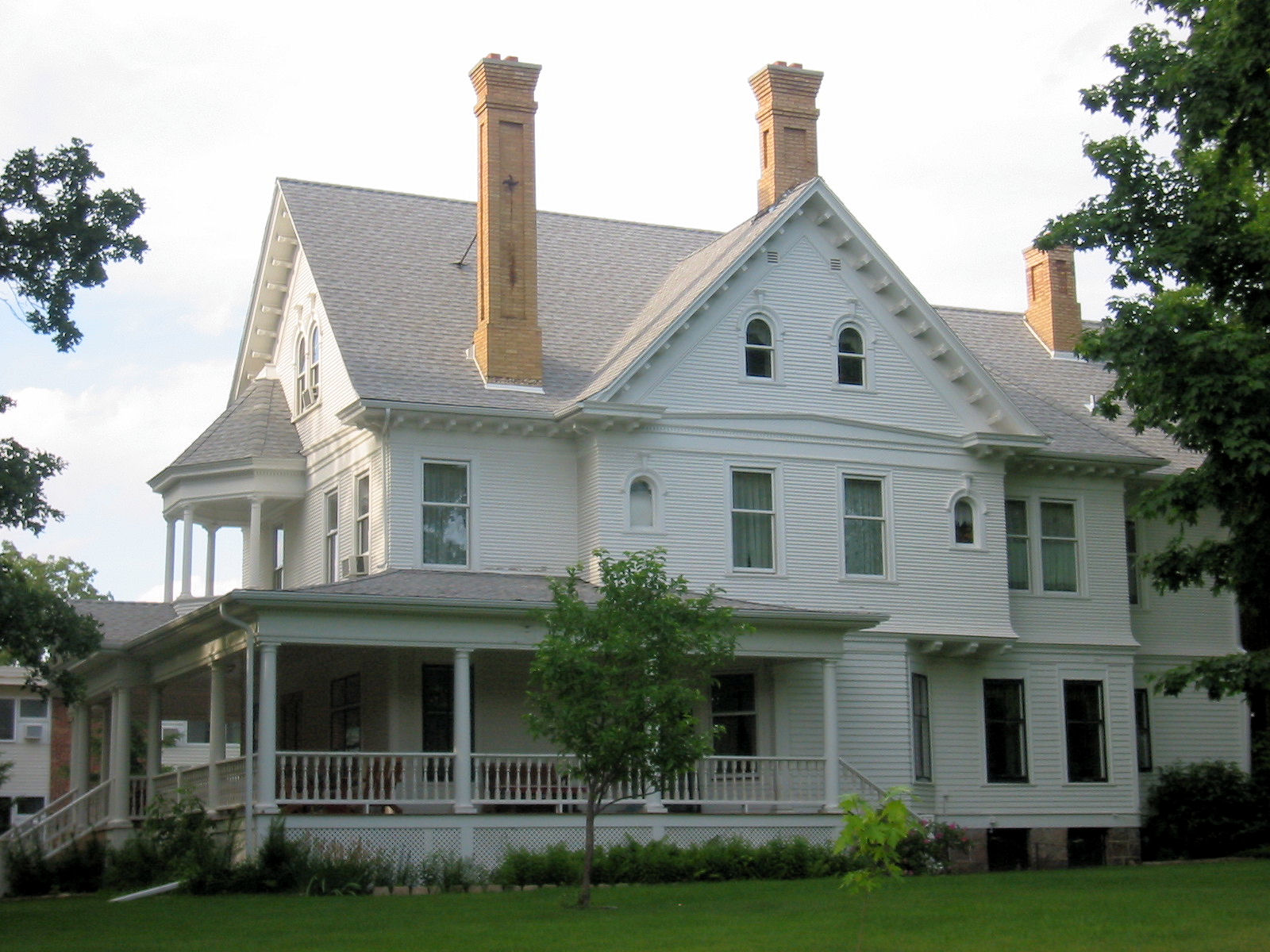
- The Patrick Casey House from the southwest

- Location within Minnesota Location within the United States
- Location: 4th Street SE and 2nd Avenue SE, Aitkin, Minnesota
- Coordinates: 46°31′35.5″N 93°42′13″W
- Area: Less than one acre
- Built: 1901
- Architect: N.J. Holden
- Architectural style: Queen Anne, Romanesque Revival
- MPS: Aitkin County MRA
- NRHP reference No.: 82002925
- Designated: April 16, 1982

The Patrick Casey House is a historic house in Aitkin, Minnesota, United States. It was built in 1901 in a mix of Queen Anne and Neoclassical styles. Original owner Patrick Casey (1849–1910) was a partner in the Potter/Casey Company, the region's leading retail chain. The house was listed on the National Register of Historic Places in 1982 for having local significance in the themes of architecture and commerce. It was nominated for its association with one of Aitkin's most prominent businessmen at the turn of the 20th century, and for being one of northern Minnesota's few architecturally distinctive residences outside of Duluth and the Iron Range cities.

== History ==
Patrick Casey moved to Aitkin in his 20s, first working as a teamster in logging camps. However he met Warren Potter, a former Civil War colonel who owned a series of retail stores in the area. Casey was hired as the manager of Potter's branch in Grand Rapids. When Potter's business partner David Williard retired, Casey was offered the partnership. Together the two men built the renamed Potter–Casey Company into the region's leading retailer.

Patrick Casey married Elizabeth Emma Killeen in 1882. They went on to have seven children, though their son Albert Edward Casey drowned at age seven. After Patrick Casey's death in 1910, his widow continued to live in the house for many years. She ultimately downsized and donated the house to the Benedictine Sisters of Duluth, who reopened the building as Maryhill Academy, a parochial school, in 1939. The school closed in 1968, and the following year a portion of the original 22-acre (8.9 ha) estate was sold off to build an apartment complex. The Casey House saw use as a group home, first for teenage girls, then in the 1980s for adults with mental disabilities. In 2001 the building was sold again and refurbished as a single-family home.

== See also ==
- National Register of Historic Places listings in Aitkin County, Minnesota
