= Farm Island Lake =

Lake in the state of Minnesota, United States

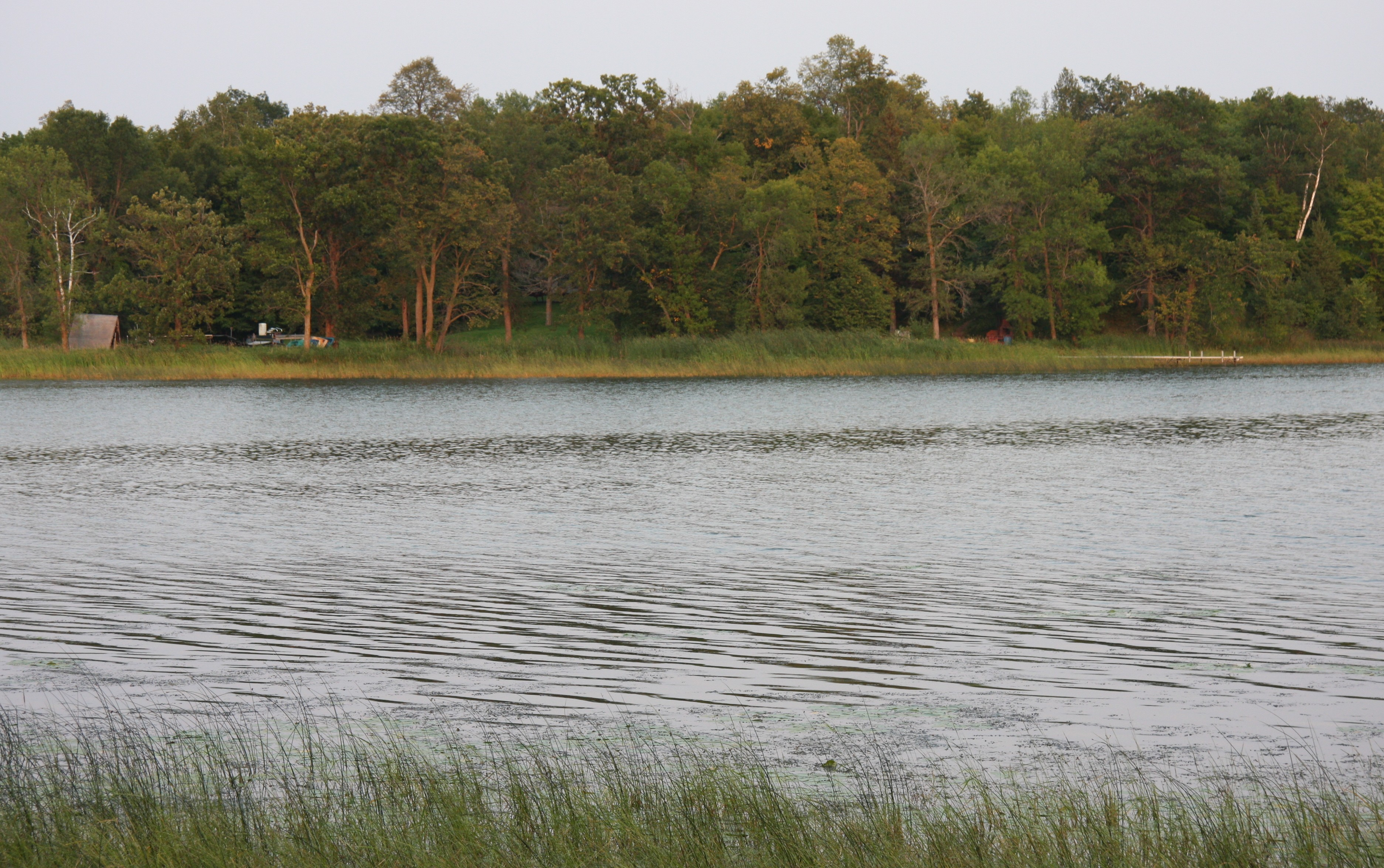
- Lake in summer 2015

- Location within Minnesota
- Location: Farm Island Township, Aitkin County, Minnesota, United States
- Coordinates: 46°25′0″N 93°46′0″W
- Surface area: 2,054 acres (831 ha)

Farm Island Lake is a lake in the U.S. state of Minnesota, located in Aitkin County, just west of U.S. Route 169 and north of Mille Lacs. Its name refers to traditional farming of islands by Ojibwe people, who also hunted, fished, and harvested wild rice. Mound Builders had a village at the south end of the lake.

The Minnesota Department of Natural Resources maintains Farm Island State Wildlife Management Area and two public boat launches on the lake. A 2009 study found the lake is dominated by native aquatic plants, especially Ceratophyllum demersum, muskgrass, and star duckweed, as well as several types of pondweed. Zebra mussels, an invasive species, have been found there. Fishing is popular, particularly for walleye, bass, and panfish.

== See also ==
- List of lakes in Minnesota
