= Pine-Hickory Lakes Roadside Parking Area =

- U.S. National Register of Historic Places
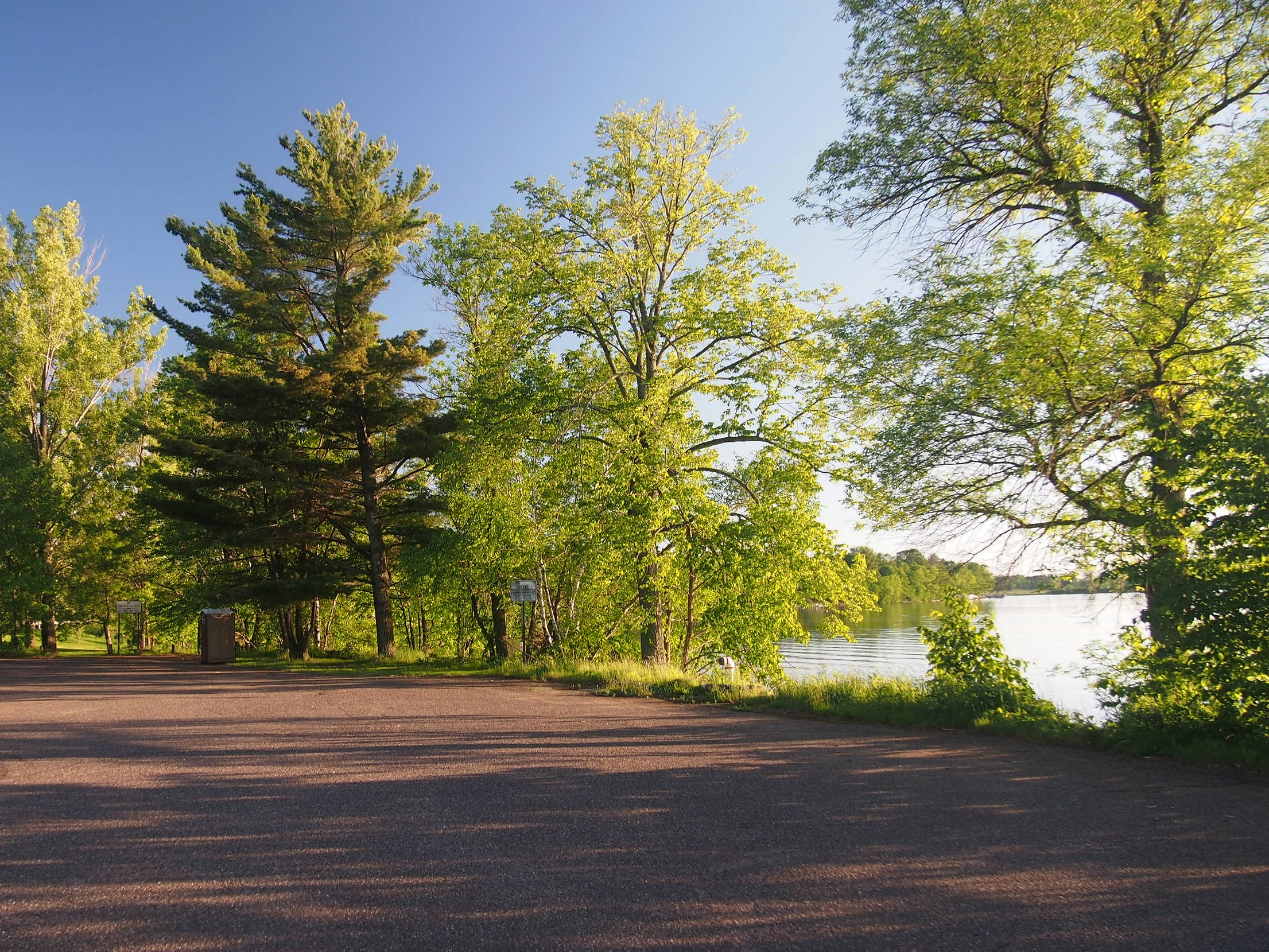

- Location within Minnesota
- Location: US 169 in Farm Island Township, Minnesota
- Coordinates: 46.443979°N 93.737943°W
- Area: 35 acres (14 ha)
- Built: 1938
- Built by: National Youth Administration
- Architect: Arthur R. Nichols
- MPS: Federal Relief Construction in Minnesota, 1933-1943
- NRHP reference No.: 16000276
- Added to NRHP: May 23, 2016

Pine-Hickory Lakes Roadside Parking Area is a wayside rest located along U.S. Highway 169 in Farm Island Township, Aitkin County, Minnesota. It straddles both sides of the highway just north of where it passes between Little Pine Lake on the west and Hickory Lake on the east. It is one of the largest wayside rests developed by the Minnesota Highway Department during the New Deal, at 35 acres (14 ha). Arthur R. Nichols, collaborating with engineer Harold E. Olson, designed the rest area in the National Park Service rustic style. The wayside rest was listed on the National Register of Historic Places in May 2016.

== History and design ==
The wayside rest was the result of a collaboration between the Minnesota Highway Department, the National Youth Administration, and the Works Progress Administration. The highway department was making an effort to improve highway safety and aesthetics, as well as encouraging the state's growing automobile tourism industry. The rest area provides public swimming, fishing, and hiking, and also provides boat access to Hickory Lake.

The site was constructed in 1938 and included a stone overlook at Hickory Lake and, on each side of the highway, a stone council ring with a fire ring at the center. Nine picnic fireplaces were distributed throughout, and 4,736 feet (1,444 m) of walking trails were established.

The western parking area was paved in the late 1950s. The National Highway Beautification Act of 1970 brought about additional upgrades including a vault restroom on the west side in 1974, but this is no longer present. An information board was also added around this time.

== Present ==
The western area of the wayside rest has hiking trails near the shore of Little Pine Lake and climbing a wooded hill. It had a picnic area with a stone fire ring with a cooking grate. The picnicking area is now overgrown and no longer accessible for picnicking, but two remaining fireplaces are intact. The east area had a footpath following the shore of Hickory Lake and looping around a steep hilltop, as well as picnicking facilities. The footpaths are currently accessible, and a stone refuse container and the remains of two fireplaces are still present, but this picnicking area is also overgrown and no longer usable for picnicking. The south area is across the Ripple River from the north and west areas, and it had footpaths connected via a small wooden footbridge to the north and west areas. The footbridge has since been removed, and the south area's trail system has been pared down because much of the land south of the river is wet during much of the year. Its picnicking area is also overgrown, but a stone "council ring" remains.
