= Potter/Casey Company Building =

- U.S. National Register of Historic Places
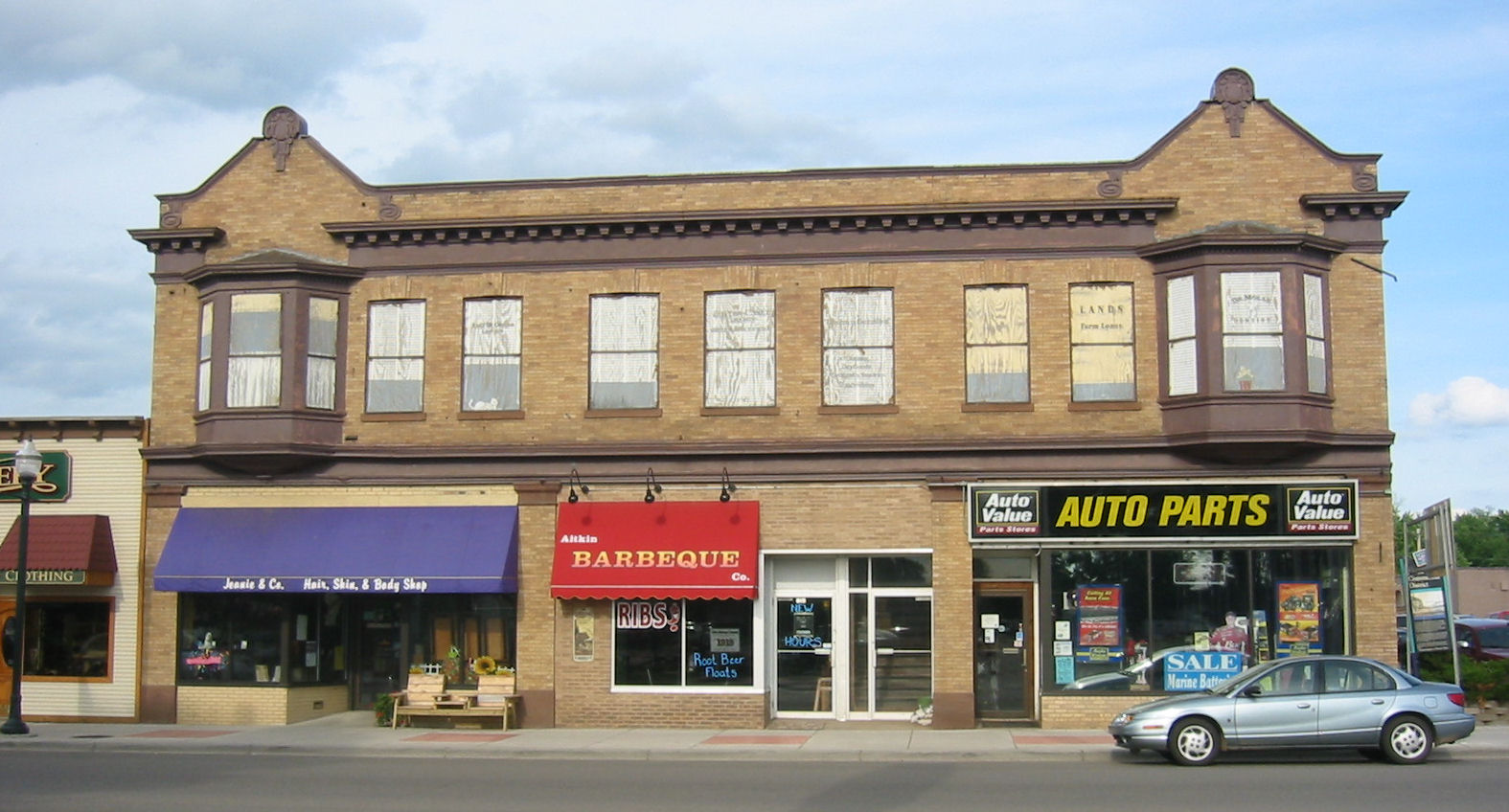
- The Potter/Casey Company Building from the west

- Location within Minnesota Location within the United States
- Location: Minnesota Avenue N between 1st and 2nd Streets NE, Aitkin, Minnesota
- Coordinates: 46°31′58.3″N 93°42′23″W
- Area: Less than one acre
- Built: 1902
- Architect: N.J. Holden
- MPS: Aitkin County MRA
- NRHP reference No.: 82002927
- Designated: April 16, 1982

The Potter/Casey Company Building is a historic commercial building in Aitkin, Minnesota, United States. It was built in 1902 to house the expanding business of Aitkin County's leading retailer and to lease office space to other businesses on the second floor. It was listed on the National Register of Historic Places in 1982 for having local significance in the theme of commerce. It was nominated for representing Aitkin County's most successful commercial enterprise at the turn of the 20th century.

== See also ==
- National Register of Historic Places listings in Aitkin County, Minnesota
