= Hill City, Minnesota =

City in Minnesota, United States

- City
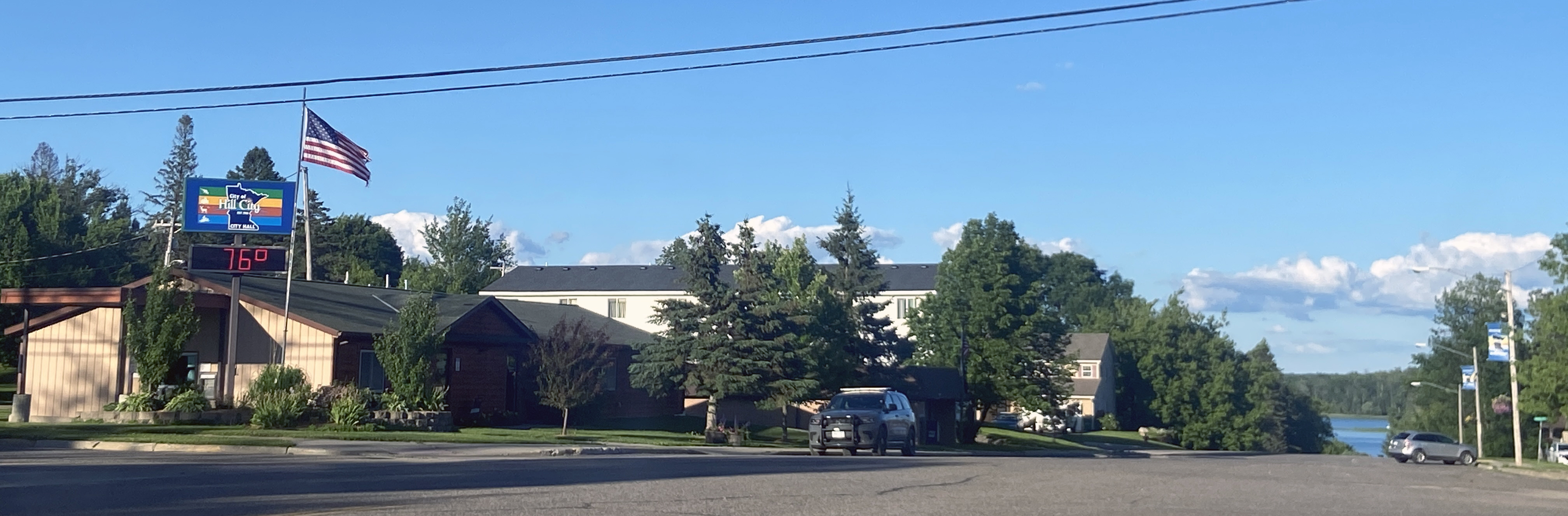
- City Hall and Hill Lake

- Logo

- Location of Hill City within Aitkin County, Minnesota
- Coordinates: 46°58′18″N 93°35′49″W
- Country: United States
- State: Minnesota
- County: Aitkin
- Incorporated: February 19, 1910

Area
  - Total: 1.36 sq mi (3.51 km^{2})
  - Land: 1.12 sq mi (2.89 km^{2})
  - Water: 0.24 sq mi (0.62 km^{2})
- Elevation: 1,296 ft (395 m)

Population (2020)
  - Total: 613
  - Density: 550.3/sq mi (212.48/km^{2})
- Time zone: UTC-6 (CST)
  - Summer (DST): UTC-5 (CDT)
- ZIP code: 55748
- Area code: 218
- FIPS code: 27-29096
- GNIS feature ID: 664474
- Website: hillcity-mn.com

Hill City is a city in Aitkin County, Minnesota, United States. The population was 613 at the 2020 census. Hill City is located along U.S. Highway 169 and Minnesota State Highway 200.

== History ==
Hill City was incorporated in 1910, and separated from surrounding Hill Lake Township in 1911. The post office began in 1901. Economic growth began with shipping cooperage stock, forest products, and produce. One property in Hill City, the 1910 National Woodenware Company Superintendent's Residence, is listed on the National Register of Historic Places.

== Geography ==
According to the United States Census Bureau, the city has a total area of 1.52 square miles (3.94 km^{2}), of which 1.28 square miles (3.32 km^{2}) is land and 0.24 square miles (0.62 km^{2}) is water.

Hill City is along the shores of Hill Lake, a glacial formation roughly 2 miles (3.2 km) long and an average of 0.25 miles (0.40 km) wide. At the southern end of the lake there is a large hill, named Quadna Mountain locally, presumably formed at the same time as the lake. The "mountain" is the namesake of Hill City. The Hill River and Morrison Brook both flow nearby. Hill lake has a depth of approximately 50 feet.

== Demographics ==
Historical population
Census	Pop.	Note	%±
1910	220		—
1920	928		321.8%
1930	515		−44.5%
1940	641		24.5%
1950	501		−21.8%
1960	429		−14.4%
1970	357		−16.8%
1980	533		49.3%
1990	469		−12.0%
2000	479		2.1%
2010	633		32.2%
2020	613		−3.2%
U.S. Decennial Census; 2020 Census

=== 2010 census ===
As of the census of 2010, there were 633 people, 271 households, and 159 families living in the city. The population density was 494.5 inhabitants per square mile (190.9/km^{2}). There were 444 housing units at an average density of 346.9 per square mile (133.9/km^{2}). The racial makeup of the city was 94.5% White, 0.2% African American, 2.5% Native American, and 2.8% from two or more races. Hispanic or Latino of any race were 2.2% of the population.

There were 271 households, of which 29.9% had children under the age of 18 living with them, 37.6% were married couples living together, 15.5% had a female householder with no husband present, 5.5% had a male householder with no wife present, and 41.3% were non-families. 36.9% of all households were made up of individuals, and 17.4% had someone living alone who was 65 years of age or older. The average household size was 2.30 and the average family size was 2.98.

The median age in the city was 43.1 years. 26.1% of residents were under the age of 18; 6.6% were between the ages of 18 and 24; 20.1% were from 25 to 44; 26.8% were from 45 to 64; and 20.4% were 65 years of age or older. The gender makeup of the city was 46.8% male and 53.2% female.

=== 2000 census ===
As of the census of 2000, there were 479 people, 213 households, and 120 families living in the city. The population density was 441.1 inhabitants per square mile (170.3/km^{2}). There were 391 housing units at an average density of 360.1 per square mile (139.0/km^{2}). The racial makeup of the city was 97.49% White, 1.88% Native American, and 0.63% from two or more races. Hispanic or Latino of any race were 1.67% of the population. 29.1% were of German, 15.7% Norwegian, 8.8% Irish, 5.9% Finnish and 5.2% French Canadian ancestry according to Census 2000.

There were 213 households, out of which 29.1% had children under the age of 18 living with them, 41.3% were married couples living together, 10.8% had a female householder with no husband present, and 43.2% were non-families. 36.2% of all households were made up of individuals, and 16.0% had someone living alone who was 65 years of age or older. The average household size was 2.25 and the average family size was 2.93.

In the city, the population was spread out, with 24.4% under the age of 18, 8.8% from 18 to 24, 25.7% from 25 to 44, 24.4% from 45 to 64, and 16.7% who were 65 years of age or older. The median age was 40 years. For every 100 females, there were 93.1 males. For every 100 females age 18 and over, there were 89.5 males.

The median income for a household in the city was $22,308, and the median income for a family was $25,000. Males had a median income of $25,972 versus $17,750 for females. The per capita income for the city was $15,742. About 15.3% of families and 14.8% of the population were below the poverty line, including 21.4% of those under age 18 and 13.8% of those age 65 or over.

== Economy ==
Local businesses include Lemco, which manufactures hydraulic knuckle boom loaders, and Roll-In Docks, which manufactures docks and pontoon boats. The town and surrounding area is also home to an ATV dealership, two restaurants, three bars, two liquor stores, a K–12 school, two gas stations and several parks, one of which offers camping.

== Arts and culture ==
Quadna Mountain is located just south of Hill City. Its attractions include a golf course, a weight room, and townhouses that resemble the city from the 1920s.

Hill Lake is located to the east of the city. It is a common site for fishing, boating, and swimming. The beach on the city side of the lake has a playground and a campsite.

The Fourth of July celebration is the biggest week in Hill City. A flea market is located across the street from Roadside Market, in a park. Approximately 1,500 people vacation in Hill City for the 4th of July Parade and later events which include street races, egg tosses, pie-eating contests, turtle races, a sawdust pile for the kids, multiple hot dog and beer carts, a street dance, and fireworks. In 2008, Hill City celebrated its 100th Fourth of July celebration.

== Gallery ==
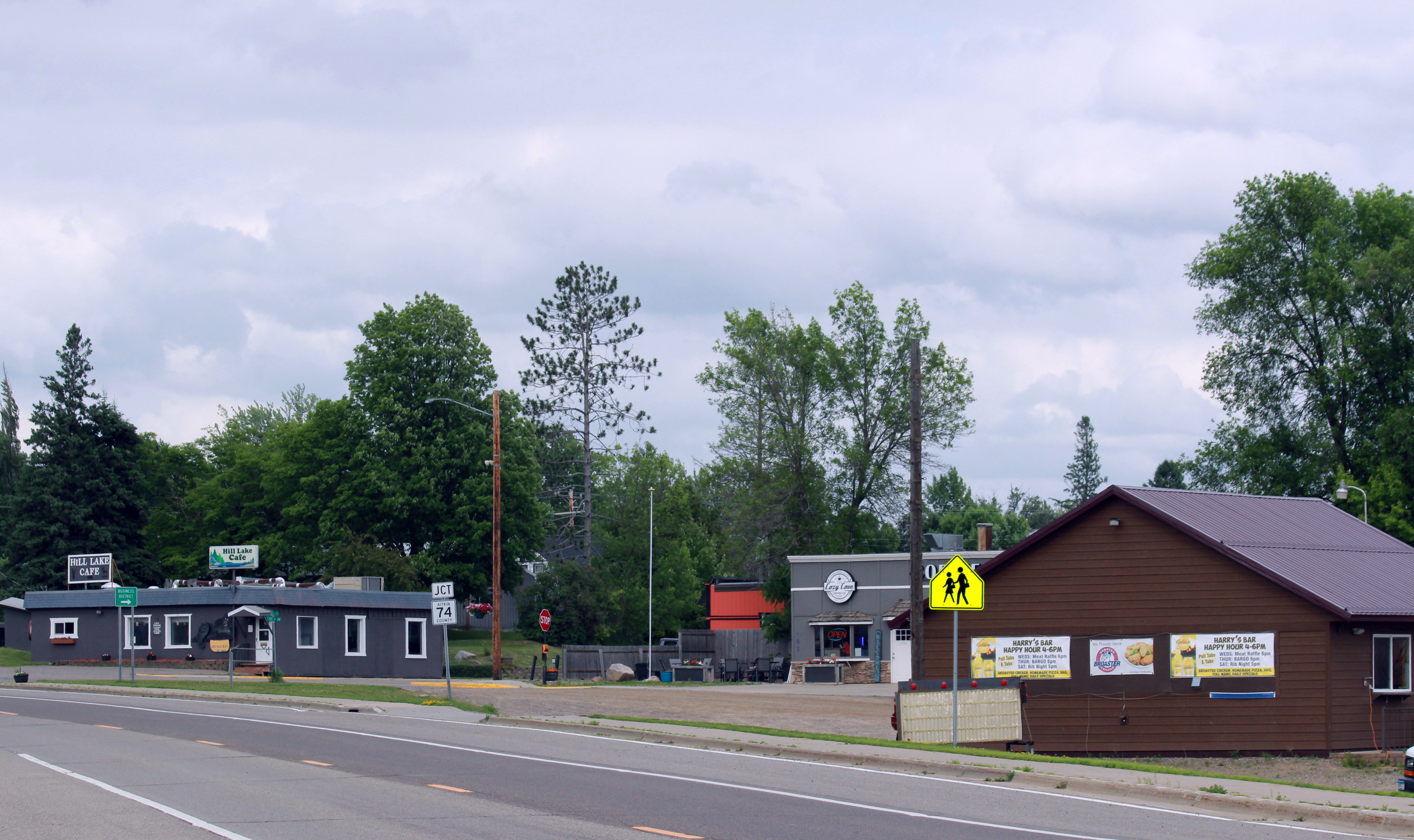
Businesses along Voyageur Hwy (US 169)

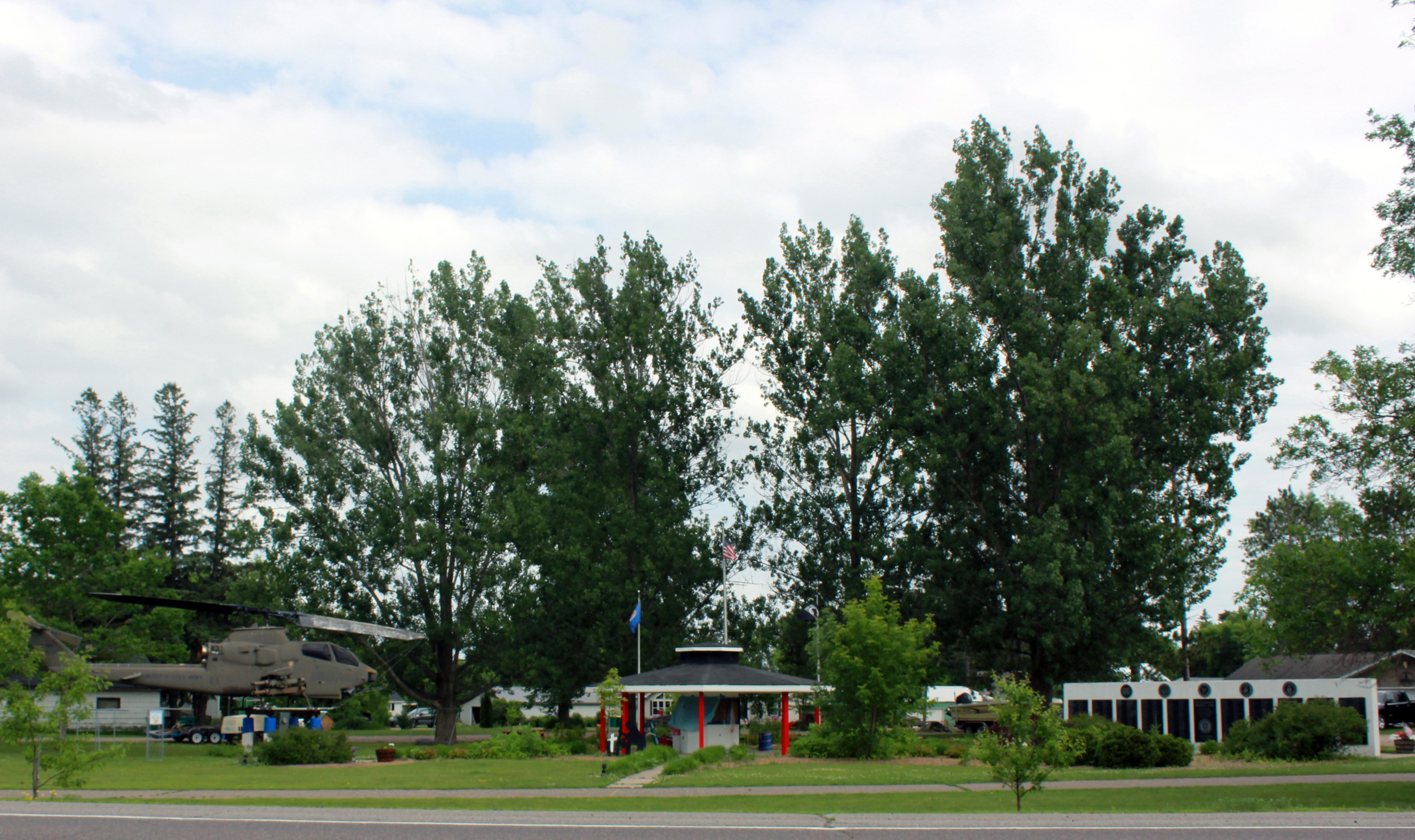
Don Beerbower Memorial Park

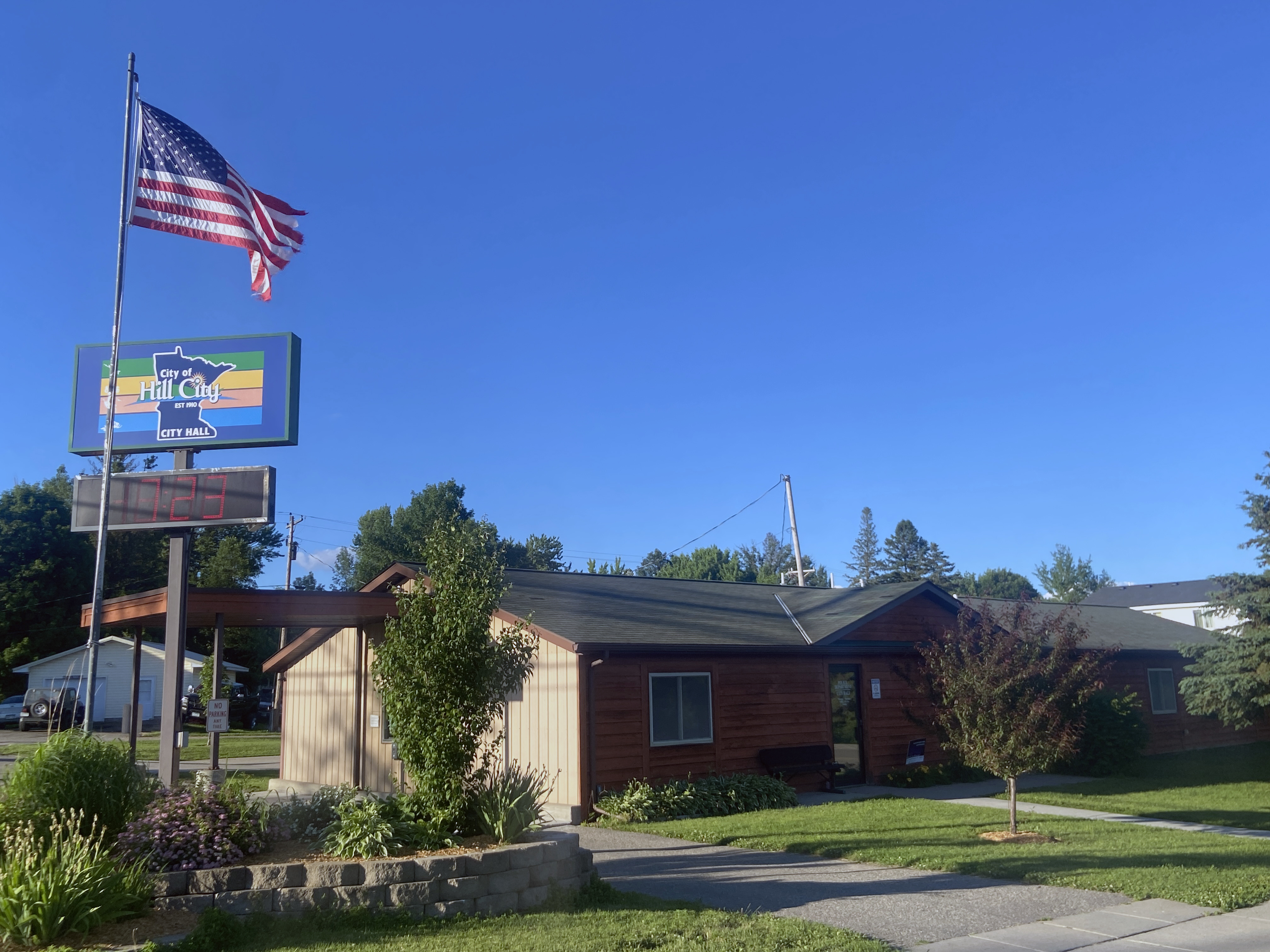
City Hall

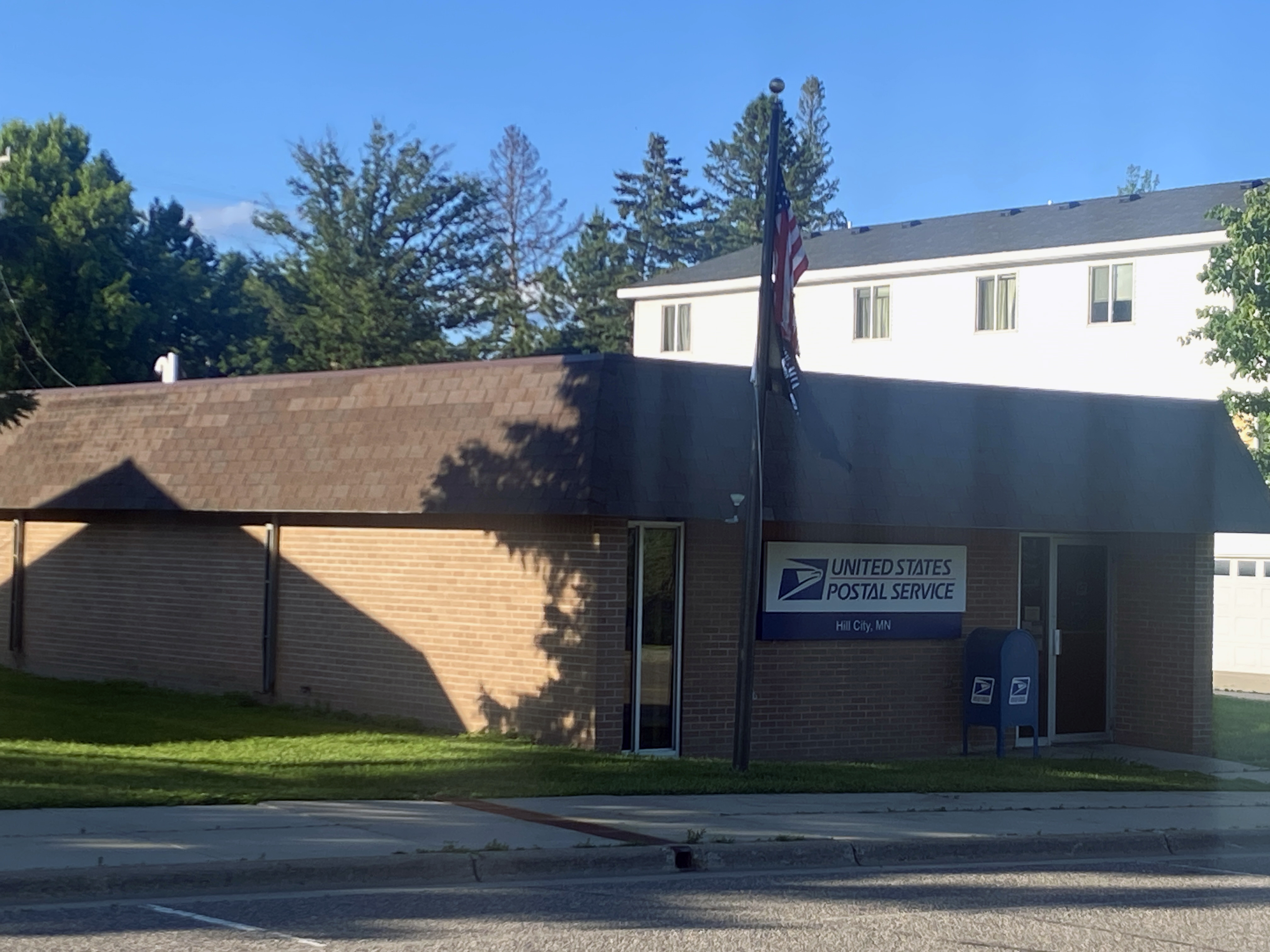
Post Office

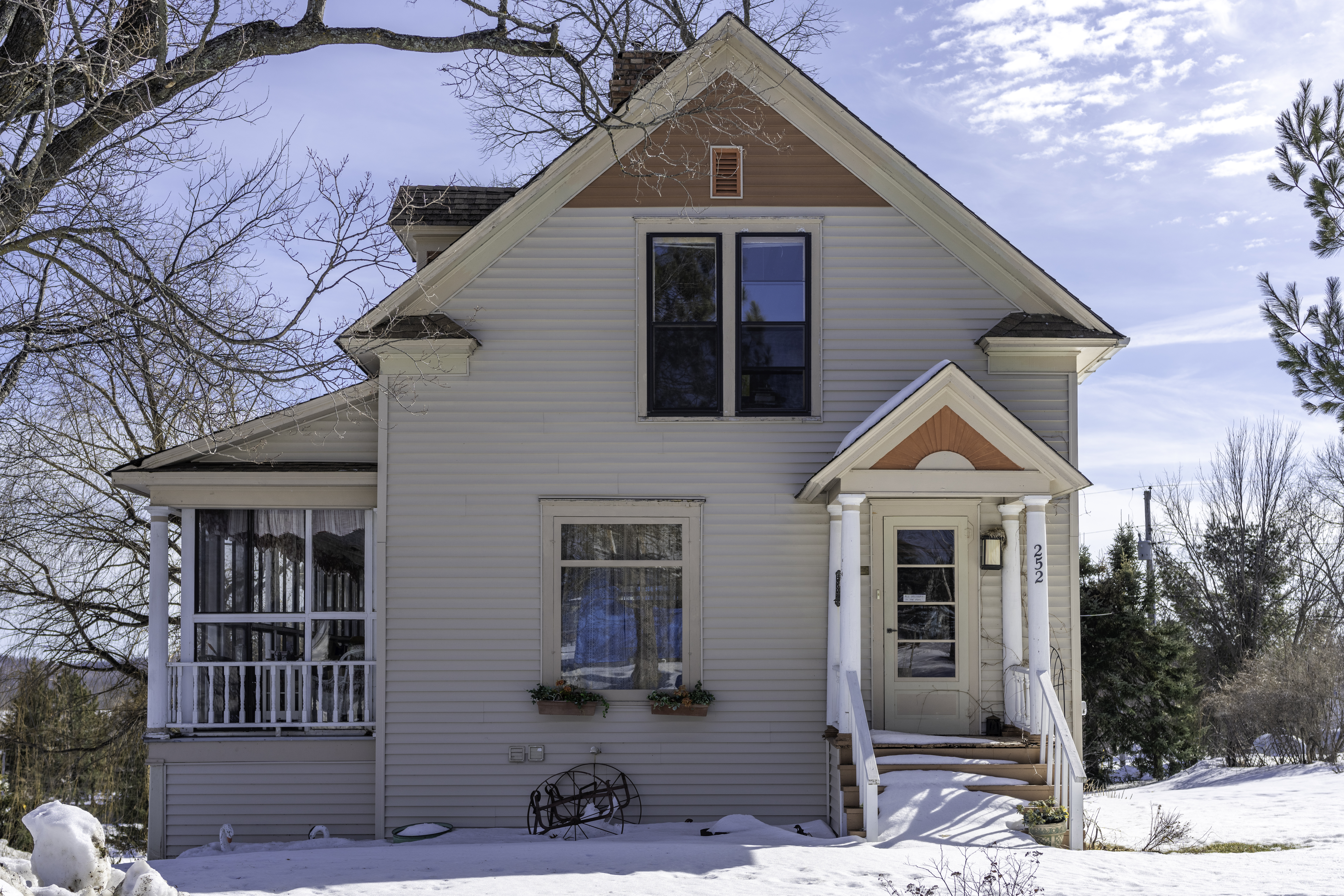
Historic National Woodenware Company Superintendent's Residence
