= Otter Creek, Minnesota =

Unincorporated community in Minnesota, US

Otter Creek
- Unincorporated community
- Location within Minnesota
- Coordinates: 46°37′31″N 92°32′20″W
- Country: United States
- State: Minnesota
- County: Carlton County
- Township: Twin Lakes Township
- Elevation: 1,152 ft (351 m)
- ZIP code: 55718
- Area code: 218
- GNIS feature ID: 0649043

Otter Creek is an unincorporated community in Twin Lakes Township, Carlton County, Minnesota, United States. The community took its name from nearby Otter Creek.

The community is located between Cloquet and Mahtowa at the junction of Carlton County Roads 5 and 61.

Otter Creek is located six miles southwest of Cloquet. The communities of Atkinson and Iverson are both nearby. Black Bear Casino Resort is also nearby.

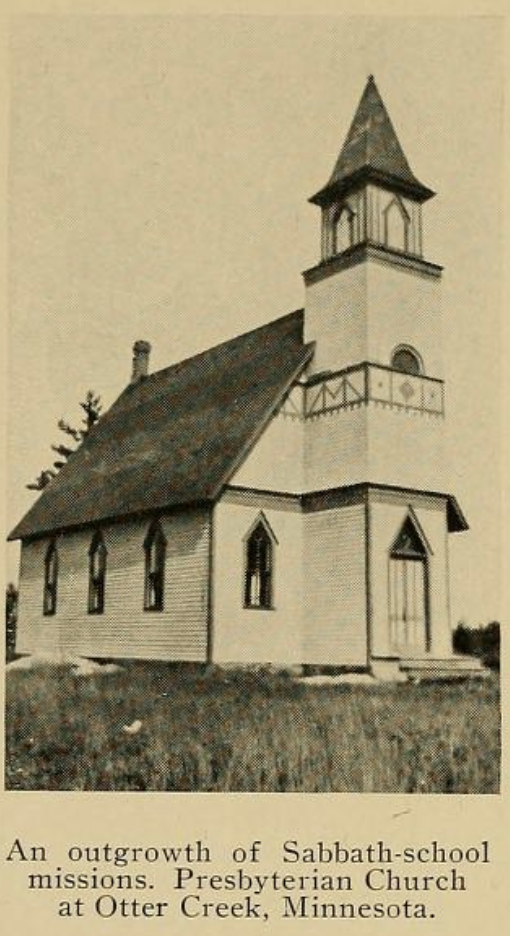
Presbyterian Church at Otter Creek, Minnesota
