= Twin Lakes Township, Carlton County, Minnesota =

Twin Lakes Township, Minnesota
- Township
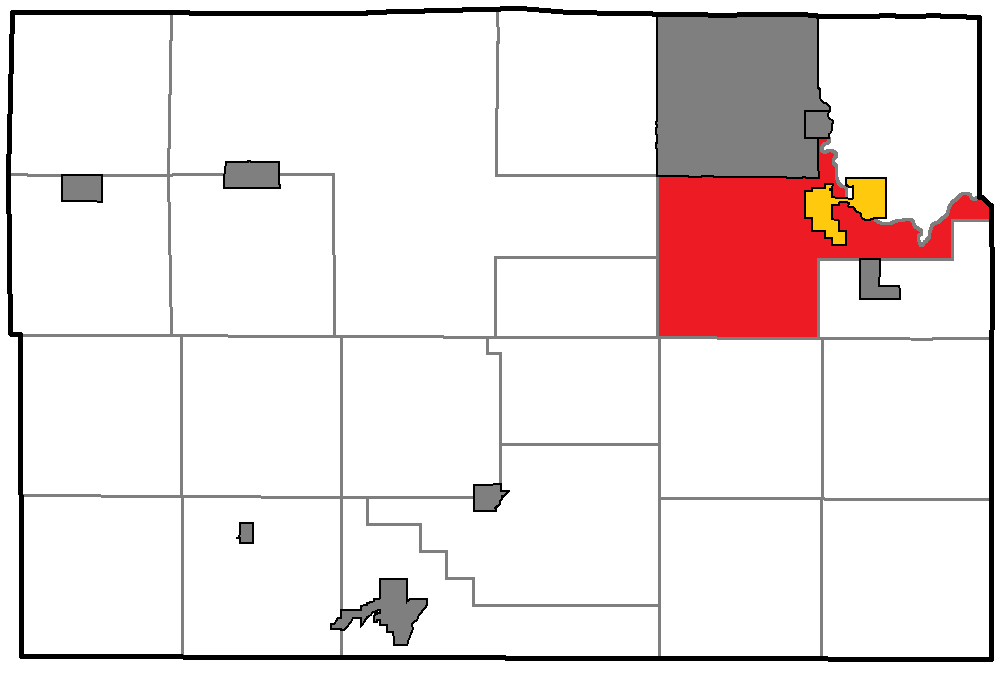
- Location of Twin Lakes Township within Carlton County, Minnesota
- Coordinates: 46°39′30″N 92°28′40″W
- Country: United States
- State: Minnesota
- County: Carlton

Area
  - Total: 44.8 sq mi (116.1 km^{2})
  - Land: 42.8 sq mi (110.8 km^{2})
  - Water: 2.0 sq mi (5.3 km^{2})
- Elevation: 1,122 ft (342 m)

Population (2020)
  - Total: 2,093
  - Density: 48.92/sq mi (18.89/km^{2})
- Time zone: UTC-6 (Central (CST))
  - Summer (DST): UTC-5 (CDT)
- Area code: 218
- FIPS code: 27-65902
- GNIS feature ID: 0665823
- Website: https://twinlakestownship.com/

Twin Lakes Township is a township in Carlton County, Minnesota, United States. The population was 2,093 as of the 2020 census.

== Geography ==
According to the United States Census Bureau, the township has a total area of 44.8 square miles (116.1 km^{2}), of which 42.8 square miles (110.7 km^{2}) is land and 2.0 square miles (5.3 km^{2}) (4.57%) is water.

The city of Carlton is located within Twin Lakes Township geographically but is a separate entity.

Black Bear Casino Resort is located within the northern portion of Twin Lakes Township.

=== Unincorporated communities ===
- Iverson
- Otter Creek
- Scotts Corner

=== Major highways ===
- Interstate 35
- Minnesota State Highway 45
- Minnesota State Highway 210

=== Lakes ===
- Chub Lake
- Hay Lake
- Lac La Belle Lake
- Lost Lake
- Venoah Lake – formerly Mink Lake

=== Adjacent townships, cities, and communities ===
The following municipalities and communities are adjacent to Twin Lakes Township :

- Thomson Township (northeast)
- Silver Brook Township (east)
- Blackhoof Township (south)
- Mahtowa Township (southwest)
- Atkinson Township (west)
- Perch Lake Township (northwest)
- The city of Cloquet (north)
- The city of Carlton (east-northeast)
- The city of Wrenshall (east)

== History ==
"Twin Lakes Township was named for its two small lakes in section 36, on the first road laid out from St. Paul, through Chisago and Pine counties, to the head of Lake Superior. A map of Minnesota in 1856, by Silas Chapman, shows this road with a small settlement named Twin Lakes, which was the only locality indicated as having inhabitants in Carlton County." - from Collections of the Minnesota Historical Society, volume XVII.

== Demographics ==
As of the census of 2000, there were 1,912 people, 681 households, and 555 families residing in the township. The population density was 44.7 inhabitants per square mile (17.3/km^{2}). There were 715 housing units at an average density of 16.7/sq mi (6.5/km^{2}). The racial makeup of the township was 95.40% White, 0.52% African American, 2.04% Native American, 0.16% Asian, 0.10% from other races, and 1.78% from two or more races. Hispanic or Latino of any race were 1.15% of the population. 21.8% were of German, 18.4% Swedish, 13.7% Norwegian and 11.6% Finnish ancestry according to Census 2000.

There were 681 households, out of which 37.4% had children under the age of 18 living with them, 71.2% were married couples living together, 6.5% had a female householder with no husband present, and 18.5% were non-families. 14.2% of all households were made up of individuals, and 2.9% had someone living alone who was 65 years of age or older. The average household size was 2.75 and the average family size was 3.03.

In the township the population was spread out, with 26.4% under the age of 18, 6.0% from 18 to 24, 27.1% from 25 to 44, 29.5% from 45 to 64, and 11.0% who were 65 years of age or older. The median age was 40 years. For every 100 females, there were 108.1 males. For every 100 females age 18 and over, there were 105.1 males.

The median income for a household in the township was $48,565, and the median income for a family was $54,118. Males had a median income of $40,526 versus $30,114 for females. The per capita income for the township was $20,265. About 4.9% of families and 6.4% of the population were below the poverty line, including 5.6% of those under age 18 and 4.1% of those age 65 or over.
