= Moose Horn River =

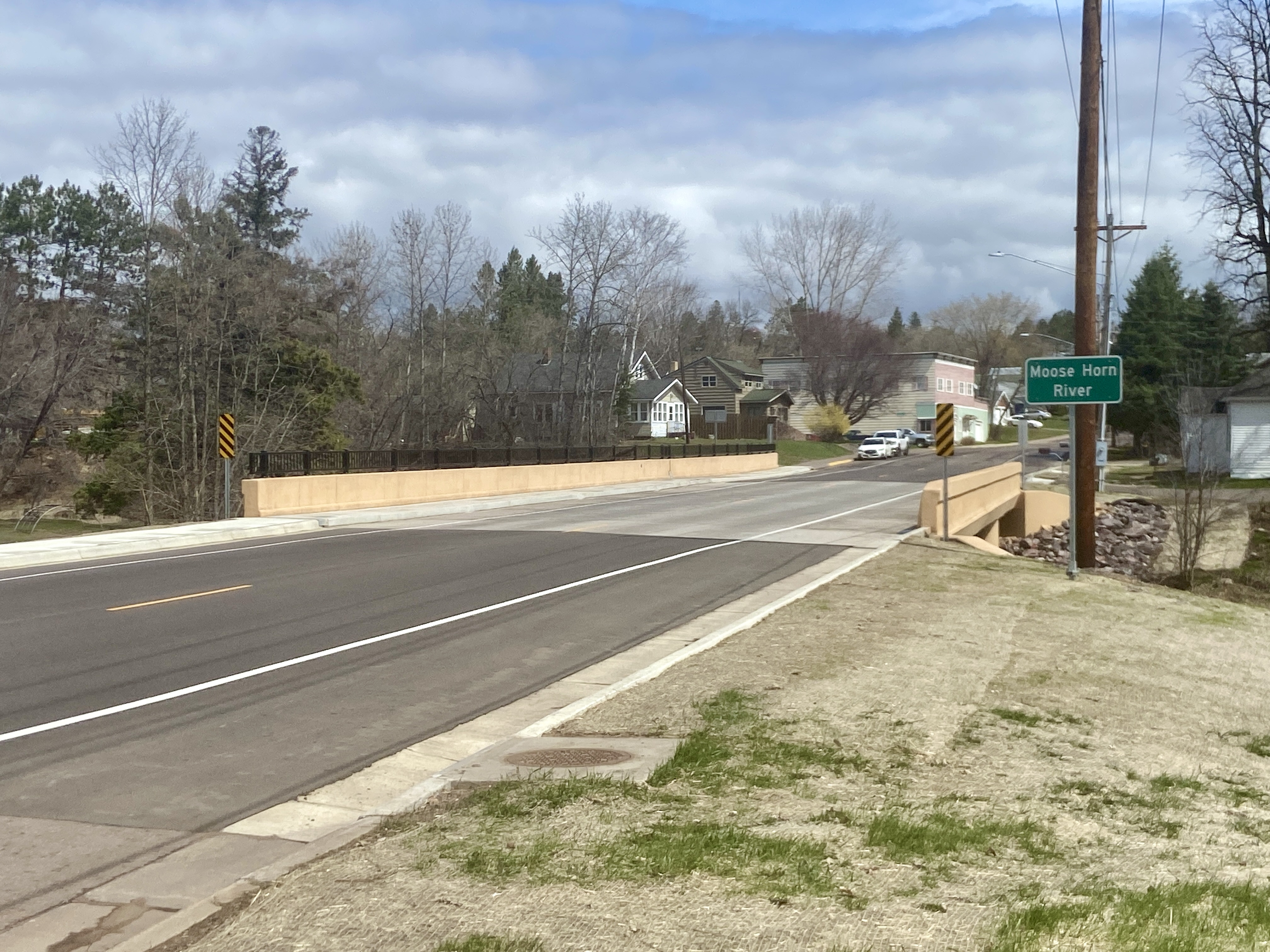
- Bridge over Moose Horn River, Barnum, Minnesota

- Mouth

Location
- Country: United States
- State: Minnesota
- County: Carlton County

Physical characteristics
- Source
  - coordinates: 46.6707782°N 92.6071382°W
- Mouth
  - coordinates: 46°21′50″N 92°50′41″W
- Length: 36.4 mi-long (58.6 km)

Basin features
- Progression: Moose Horn River→ Kettle River→ St. Croix River→ Mississippi River→ Gulf of Mexico
- River system: St. Croix River

The Moose Horn River is a 36.4-mile-long (58.6 km) tributary of the Kettle River in eastern Minnesota, United States. It is part of the St. Croix River watershed, flowing eventually to the Mississippi River. It rises at the outlet of Wild River Lake, 7 miles (11 km) southwest of the city of Cloquet, and flows southwest through Carlton County, roughly parallel to Interstate 35. The river passes the communities of Mahtowa, Barnum, and Moose Lake, ending at the Kettle River southwest of the city of Sturgeon Lake.

== See also ==
- List of rivers of Minnesota
- List of longest streams of Minnesota
