= Carleton School =

Carleton School may refer to:

== Elementary ==
- Sir Guy Carleton Elementary School, in Vancouver, British Columbia

== Secondary ==
- Carleton School (Massachusetts)
- Sir Guy Carleton Secondary School, in Ottawa, Ontario

== Post-secondary ==
- Carleton University, in Ottawa, Ontario
  - Carleton School of Information Technology
  - Carleton School of Journalism

== See also ==
- Carlton School District, in Carlton, Minnesota
  - Carlton High School
