= Barnum Township, Carlton County, Minnesota =

Barnum Township, Minnesota
- Township
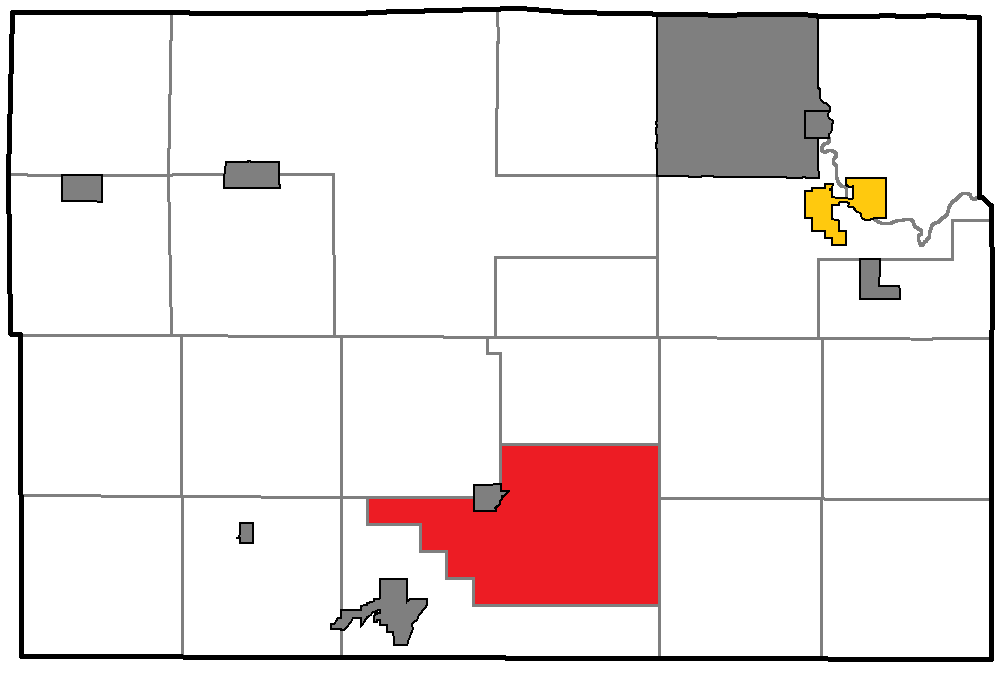
- Location of Barnum Township within Carlton County, Minnesota
- Coordinates: 46°29′43″N 92°39′23″W
- Country: United States
- State: Minnesota
- County: Carlton

Area
  - Total: 46.2 sq mi (119.6 km^{2})
  - Land: 45.0 sq mi (116.5 km^{2})
  - Water: 1.2 sq mi (3.1 km^{2})
- Elevation: 1,132 ft (345 m)

Population (2020)
  - Total: 1,098
  - Density: 24.41/sq mi (9.425/km^{2})
- Time zone: UTC-6 (Central (CST))
  - Summer (DST): UTC-5 (CDT)
- ZIP code: 55707
- Area code: 218
- FIPS code: 27-03646
- GNIS feature ID: 0663510

Barnum Township is a township in Carlton County, Minnesota, United States. The population was 1,098 as of the 2020 census. Barnum Township was named for George G. Barnum, a railroad official.

== Geography ==
According to the United States Census Bureau, the township has a total area of 46.2 square miles (120 km^{2}), of which 45.0 square miles (117 km^{2}) is land and 1.2 square miles (3.1 km^{2}) (2.58%) is water.

The city of Barnum is located within Barnum Township geographically but is a separate entity.

=== Unincorporated community ===
- Nemadji

=== Major highway ===
- Interstate 35

=== Lakes ===
- Bear Lake
- Cranberry Lake (east quarter)
- Eddy Lake
- Hanging Horn Lake
- Kahring Lake
- Katzel Lake (south quarter)
- Little Hanging Horn Lake
- Lake Twentynine
- Lost Lake
- Mud Lake
- Sandy Lake (west edge)

=== Adjacent townships ===
- Mahtowa Township (north)
- Blackhoof Township (east)
- Moose Lake Township (southwest)
- Skelton Township (northwest)

=== Cemeteries ===
The township contains these two cemeteries: Riverside and Sunset Memorial.

== Demographics ==
As of the census of 2000, there were 978 people, 375 households, and 281 families residing in the township. The population density was 21.7 inhabitants per square mile (8.4/km^{2}). There were 576 housing units at an average density of 12.8 per square mile (4.9/km^{2}). The racial makeup of the township was 97.65% White, 0.61% Native American, 0.31% Asian, 0.10% from other races, and 1.33% from two or more races. Hispanic or Latino of any race were 1.23% of the population. 25.6% were of German, 15.4% Swedish, 13.3% Finnish, 12.2% Norwegian and 6.1% Irish ancestry according to Census 2000.

There were 375 households, out of which 31.7% had children under the age of 18 living with them, 68.0% were married couples living together, 4.3% had a female householder with no husband present, and 24.8% were non-families. 21.3% of all households were made up of individuals, and 6.7% had someone living alone who was 65 years of age or older. The average household size was 2.61 and the average family size was 2.99.

In the township the population was spread out, with 26.3% under the age of 18, 6.6% from 18 to 24, 27.7% from 25 to 44, 27.3% from 45 to 64, and 12.1% who were 65 years of age or older. The median age was 39 years. For every 100 females, there were 110.3 males. For every 100 females age 18 and over, there were 109.0 males.

The median income for a household in the township was $42,679, and the median income for a family was $51,016. Males had a median income of $37,574 versus $23,594 for females. The per capita income for the township was $18,776. About 4.5% of families and 7.9% of the population were below the poverty line, including 13.5% of those under age 18 and 5.0% of those age 65 or over.
