= Pleasant Valley, Minnesota =

Unincorporated community in Minnesota, US

Pleasant Valley
- Unincorporated community
- Location within Minnesota
- Coordinates: 46°32′18″N 92°23′06″W
- Country: United States
- State: Minnesota
- County: Carlton County
- Township: Wrenshall Township
- Elevation: 922 ft (281 m)
- ZIP code: 55797
- Area code: 218
- GNIS feature ID: 0649568

Pleasant Valley is an unincorporated community in Wrenshall Township, Carlton County, Minnesota, United States.

The community is located between Wrenshall and Holyoke at the junction of Carlton County Roads 1 and 112; near State Highway 23 (MN 23).

Pleasant Valley is five miles south of Wrenshall.
