= Holyoke Township, Carlton County, Minnesota =

Holyoke Township, Minnesota
- Township
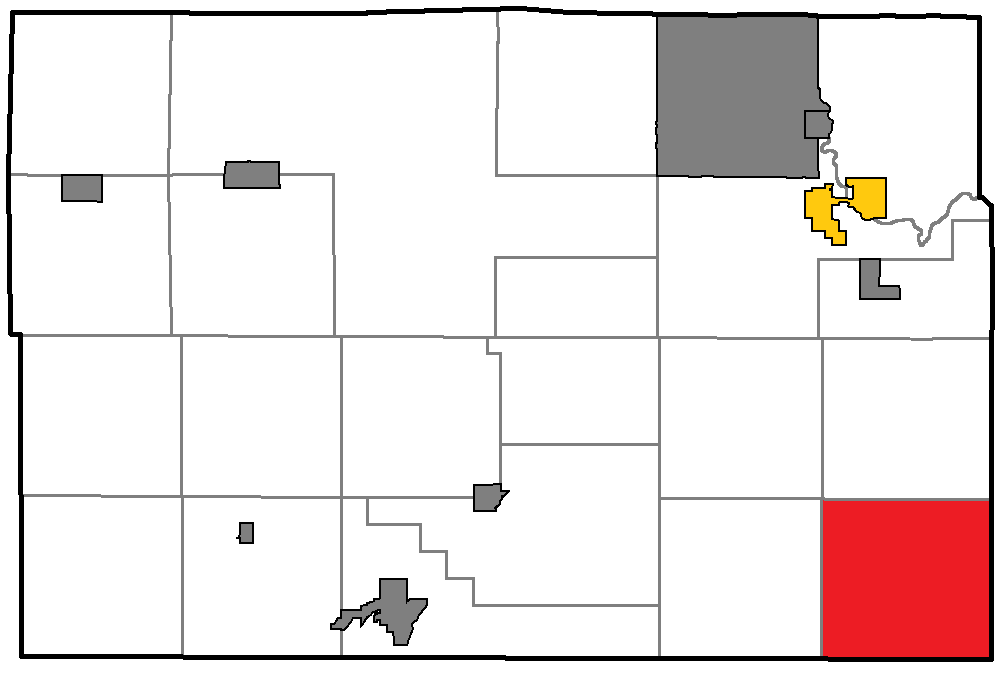
- Location of Holyoke Township within Carlton County, Minnesota
- Coordinates: 46°28′44″N 92°21′40″W
- Country: United States
- State: Minnesota
- County: Carlton

Area
  - Total: 38.0 sq mi (98.4 km^{2})
  - Land: 37.9 sq mi (98.2 km^{2})
  - Water: 0.077 sq mi (0.2 km^{2})
- Elevation: 1,047 ft (319 m)

Population (2020)
  - Total: 209
  - Density: 5.51/sq mi (2.13/km^{2})
- Time zone: UTC-6 (Central (CST))
  - Summer (DST): UTC-5 (CDT)
- ZIP codes: 55749, 55797
- Area code: 218
- FIPS code: 27-29942
- GNIS feature ID: 0664510

Holyoke Township is a township in Carlton County, Minnesota, United States. The population was 209 as of the 2020 census.

== History ==
Holyoke Township was organized in 1903, and took its name from the community of Holyoke, Minnesota.

== Geography ==
According to the United States Census Bureau, the township has a total area of 38.0 square miles (98 km^{2}), of which 37.9 square miles (98 km^{2}) is land and 0.1 square miles (0.26 km^{2}) (0.18%) is water.

Holyoke is located 13 miles south of Wrenshall.

=== Unincorporated community ===
- Holyoke

=== Major highway ===
- Minnesota State Highway 23

=== Lakes ===
- Mud Lake

=== Adjacent townships ===
- Wrenshall Township (north)
- Nickerson Township, Pine County (southwest)
- Blackhoof Township (northwest)

== Demographics ==
As of the census of 2000, there were 179 people, 82 households, and 47 families residing in the township. The population density was 4.7 inhabitants per square mile (1.8/km^{2}). There were 140 housing units at an average density of 3.7 per square mile (1.4/km^{2}). The racial makeup of the township was 98.88% White, 0.56% Native American, and 0.56% from two or more races.

There were 82 households, out of which 24.4% had children under the age of 18 living with them, 48.8% were married couples living together, 4.9% had a female householder with no husband present, and 41.5% were non-families. 36.6% of all households were made up of individuals, and 8.5% had someone living alone who was 65 years of age or older. The average household size was 2.18 and the average family size was 2.88.

In the township the population was spread out, with 21.2% under the age of 18, 4.5% from 18 to 24, 30.7% from 25 to 44, 31.8% from 45 to 64, and 11.7% who were 65 years of age or older. The median age was 42 years. For every 100 females, there were 110.6 males. For every 100 females age 18 and over, there were 120.3 males.

The median income for a household in the township was $41,563, and the median income for a family was $52,500. Males had a median income of $38,542 versus $27,083 for females. The per capita income for the township was $19,805. None of the families and 7.7% of the population were living below the poverty line, including no under eighteens and 11.1% of those over 64.
