= Wrenshall School District =

School district in Minnesota, United States

Address
- 207 Pioneer Drive Wrenshall, Minnesota, 55797; United States

District information
- Type: Public
- Grades: PreK–12
- NCES District ID: 2744190

Students and staff
- Students: 378
- Teachers: 30.97
- Staff: 30.96
- Student–teacher ratio: 12.21

Other information
- Website: www.isd100.org

Wrenshall School District, ISD #100 is a school district headquartered in Wrenshall, Minnesota. It is entirely in Carlton County. It is divided into elementary and secondary divisions.

== History ==
In 2019 the Wrenshall district and the Carlton School District were in talks on the possibility of consolidating. By September 2020 a study was released stating that if Carlton and Wrenshall consolidated, the taxpayer in the former Carlton zone would pay two and one half times the rate that a Wrenshall zone taxpayer would. Some legislation that would have facilitated the merger was, in 2020, not passed by the Minnesota Legislature. Additionally the compositions of the school boards changed.

The two school boards chose not to hold further discussions on consolidation after February 2021. On June 21, 2021, the Carlton School Board stated that it no longer wished to consolidate with Wrenshall. In 2026, the districts merged to form Carlton-Wrenshall School District.

== Athletics ==
The Carlton and Wrenshall school districts have a shared athletics team. By August 2021 the fact that Carlton was now in negotiations with Cloquet over a tuition agreement could impact the Carlton-Wrenshall team.
