= Carlton School District =

School district in Minnesota, US

Address
- 405 School Avenue Carlton, Minnesota, 55718; United States

District information
- Type: Public
- Grades: PreK–12
- NCES District ID: 2707590

Students and staff
- Students: 398
- Teachers: 34.21
- Staff: 33.89
- Student–teacher ratio: 11.63

Other information
- Website: www.carlton.k12.mn.us

Carlton Independent School District 93, also known as Carlton School District or Carlton Public Schools, is a school district headquartered in Carlton, Minnesota. It operates two schools: South Terrace Elementary School (PK-5) and Carlton High School (6-12).

Entirely in Carlton County, it serves most of Carlton, much of Big Lake, and a small section of Cloquet.

== History ==
The District #15 district was created on a date prior to February 2, 1913, and merged with Wrenshall at around this time period. Circa 1951 it became District #2 as it merged with the Sawyer district. It received its current formal name circa 1957.

In 2019 the Carlton district and the Wrenshall School District were in talks on the possibility of consolidating. By September 2020 a study was released stating that if Carlton and Wrenshall consolidated, the taxpayer in the former Carlton zone would pay two and one half times the rate that a Wrenshall zone taxpayer would. Some legislation that would have facilitated the merger was, in 2020, not passed by the Minnesota Legislature. Additionally the compositions of the school boards changed.

The two school boards chose not to hold further discussions on consolidation after February 2021. That month Carlton began discussing with Cloquet Public Schools the possibility of an agreement to send high school students to Cloquet. The Carlton district was also working on its own referendum for new facilities.

On June 21, 2021, the Carlton School Board stated that it no longer wished to consolidate with Wrenshall and that it was considering using the South Terrace campus as a single K-12 site and/or consolidating with the Cloquet or Barnum school districts. Carlton, in July 2021, was still negotiating with Cloquet. In 2026, the districts merged to form Carlton-Wrenshall School District.

== Student body ==
As of 2021 it had about 500 students, with about 33% being eligible for free or reduced price lunches and 16% of students having Native American ancestry.

== Athletics ==
The Carlton and Wrensall school districts have a shared athletics team. By August 2021 the fact that Carlton was now in negotiations with Cloquet over a tuition agreement could impact the Carlton-Wrensall team.
