= Nemadji, Minnesota =

Unincorporated community in Minnesota, US

Nemadji
- Unincorporated community
- Location within Minnesota
- Coordinates: 46°28′46″N 92°35′41″W
- Country: United States
- State: Minnesota
- County: Carlton County
- Township: Barnum Township
- Elevation: 1,060 ft (323 m)
- ZIP code: 55707
- Area code: 218
- GNIS feature ID: 0654843

Nemadji is an unincorporated community in Barnum Township, Carlton County, Minnesota, United States.

Carlton County Roads 8 and 11 are two of the main routes in the community.

Nemadji is located six miles east-southeast of Barnum and nine miles east-northeast of Moose Lake.

== History ==
A post office was established at Nemadji in 1912, and remained in operation until it was discontinued in 1953. The community took its name from the Nemadji River.
