= Duesler, Minnesota =

Unincorporated community in Minnesota, US

Duesler
- Unincorporated community
- Location within Minnesota
- Coordinates: 46°30′43″N 92°30′31″W
- Country: United States
- State: Minnesota
- County: Carlton County
- Township: Blackhoof Township
- Elevation: 1,014 ft (309 m)
- ZIP code: 55707
- Area code: 218
- GNIS feature ID: 0654679

Duesler is an unincorporated community in Blackhoof Township, Carlton County, Minnesota, United States.

Carlton County Road 6 serves as a main route in the community. Duesler is located eight miles east of Barnum.
