= Skelton Township, Carlton County, Minnesota =

Skelton Township, Minnesota
- Township
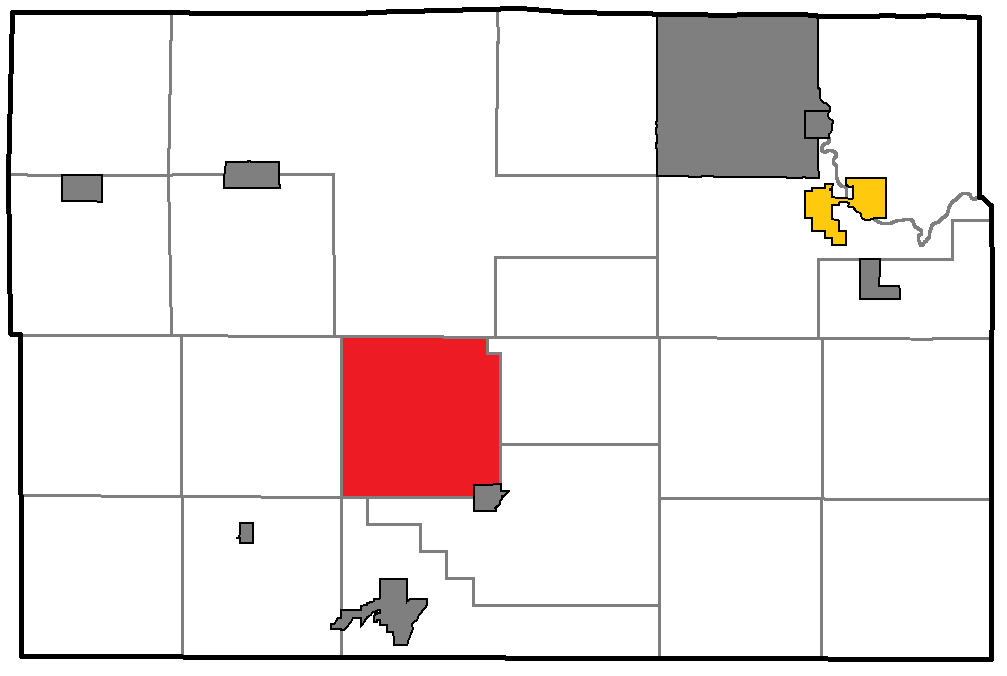
- Location of Skelton Township within Carlton County Map, Minnesota
- Coordinates: 46°33′1″N 92°44′19″W
- Country: United States
- State: Minnesota
- County: Carlton

Area
  - Total: 35.0 sq mi (90.6 km^{2})
  - Land: 35.0 sq mi (90.6 km^{2})
  - Water: 0.039 sq mi (0.1 km^{2})
- Elevation: 1,194 ft (364 m)

Population (2020)
  - Total: 413
  - Density: 11.8/sq mi (4.56/km^{2})
- Time zone: UTC-6 (Central (CST))
  - Summer (DST): UTC-5 (CDT)
- ZIP code: 55707
- Area code: 218
- FIPS code: 27-60664
- GNIS feature ID: 0665627

Skelton Township is a township in Carlton County, Minnesota, United States. The population was 413 as of the 2020 census. Skelton Township was named for John and Harry E. Skelton, two brothers who were both employed as county officials.

== Geography ==
According to the United States Census Bureau, the township has a total area of 35.0 square miles (90.6 km^{2}), of which 35.0 square miles (90.6 km^{2}) is land and 0.04 square miles (0.1 km^{2}) (0.09%) is water.

The northwest quarter of the city of Barnum is located within Skelton Township geographically but is a separate entity.

=== Adjacent townships ===
- Mahtowa Township (east)
- Barnum Township (southeast)
- Moose Lake Township (south)
- Silver Township (southwest)
- Kalevala Township (west)

== Demographics ==
As of the census of 2000, there were 372 people, 128 households, and 107 families residing in the township. The population density was 10.6 people per square mile (4.1/km^{2}). There were 160 housing units at an average density of 4.6/sq mi (1.8/km^{2}). The racial makeup of the township was 99.46% White and 0.54% Native American.

There were 128 households, out of which 39.1% had children under the age of 18 living with them, 74.2% were married couples living together, 3.1% had a female householder with no husband present, and 16.4% were non-families. 14.8% of all households were made up of individuals, and 9.4% had someone living alone who was 65 years of age or older. The average household size was 2.91 and the average family size was 3.11.

In the township the population was spread out, with 28.8% under the age of 18, 7.3% from 18 to 24, 28.5% from 25 to 44, 23.7% from 45 to 64, and 11.8% who were 65 years of age or older. The median age was 38 years. For every 100 females, there were 110.2 males. For every 100 females age 18 and over, there were 107.0 males.

The median income for a household in the township was $45,568, and the median income for a family was $47,159. Males had a median income of $35,469 versus $26,250 for females. The per capita income for the township was $15,571. About 1.7% of families and 4.1% of the population were below the poverty line, including 2.8% of those under age 18 and none of those age 65 or over.
