= Wrenshall Township, Carlton County, Minnesota =

Wrenshall Township, Minnesota
- Township
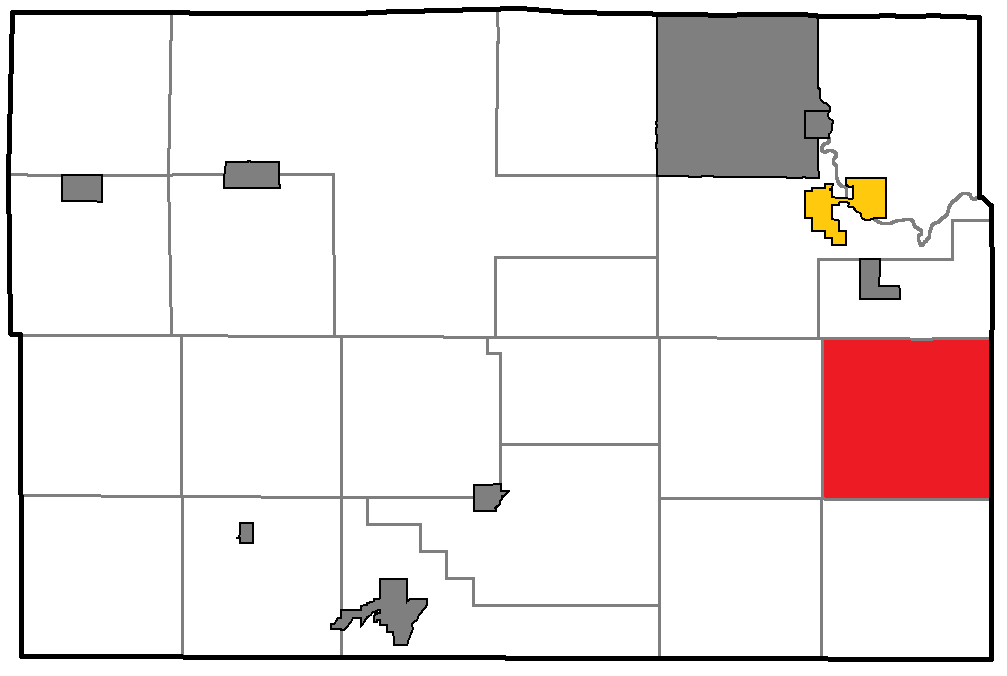
- Location of Wrenshall Township within Carlton County, Minnesota
- Coordinates: 46°32′19″N 92°22′49″W
- Country: United States
- State: Minnesota
- County: Carlton

Area
  - Total: 37.9 sq mi (98.1 km^{2})
  - Land: 37.9 sq mi (98.1 km^{2})
  - Water: 0 sq mi (0.0 km^{2})
- Elevation: 912 ft (278 m)

Population (2020)
  - Total: 443
  - Density: 11.7/sq mi (4.52/km^{2})
- Time zone: UTC-6 (Central (CST))
  - Summer (DST): UTC-5 (CDT)
- ZIP codes: 55749, 55797
- Area code: 218
- FIPS code: 27-71806
- GNIS feature ID: 0666055

Wrenshall Township is a township in Carlton County, Minnesota, United States. The population was 443 at the 2020 census. Wrenshall Township was named for C. C. Wrenshall, a railroad official.

== Geography ==
According to the United States Census Bureau, the township has a total area of 37.9 square miles (98.1 km^{2}), all land.

=== Unincorporated communities ===
- Pleasant Valley

=== Major highway ===
- Minnesota State Highway 23

=== Adjacent townships, cities, and communities ===
The following municipalities and communities are adjacent to Wrenshall Township :

- Silver Brook Township (north)
- The city of Wrenshall (north)
- Holyoke Township (south)
- Blackhoof Township (west)

=== Cemeteries ===
The township contains Saint John's Lutheran Cemetery.

== Demographics ==
As of the census of 2000, there were 326 people, 128 households, and 88 families residing in the township. The population density was 8.6 people per square mile (3.3/km^{2}). There were 142 housing units at an average density of 3.8/sq mi (1.4/km^{2}). The racial makeup of the township was 92.94% White, 0.92% African American, 1.23% Native American, 1.23% Asian, and 3.68% from two or more races.

There were 128 households, out of which 32.8% had children under the age of 18 living with them, 60.2% were married couples living together, 3.9% had a female householder with no husband present, and 30.5% were non-families. 28.1% of all households were made up of individuals, and 5.5% had someone living alone who was 65 years of age or older. The average household size was 2.55 and the average family size was 3.07.

In the township the population was spread out, with 25.8% under the age of 18, 6.1% from 18 to 24, 31.9% from 25 to 44, 28.5% from 45 to 64, and 7.7% who were 65 years of age or older. The median age was 39 years. For every 100 females, there were 118.8 males. For every 100 females age 18 and over, there were 124.1 males.

The median income for a household in the township was $44,219, and the median income for a family was $45,417. Males had a median income of $36,250 versus $18,750 for females. The per capita income for the township was $25,067. About 2.2% of families and 4.7% of the population were below the poverty line, including none of those under the age of 18 and 23.8% of those 65 and older.
