= Clear Creek, Minnesota =

Unorganized territory in Minnesota, US

Coordinates: 46°27′43″N 92°29′31″W

- Unorganized territory
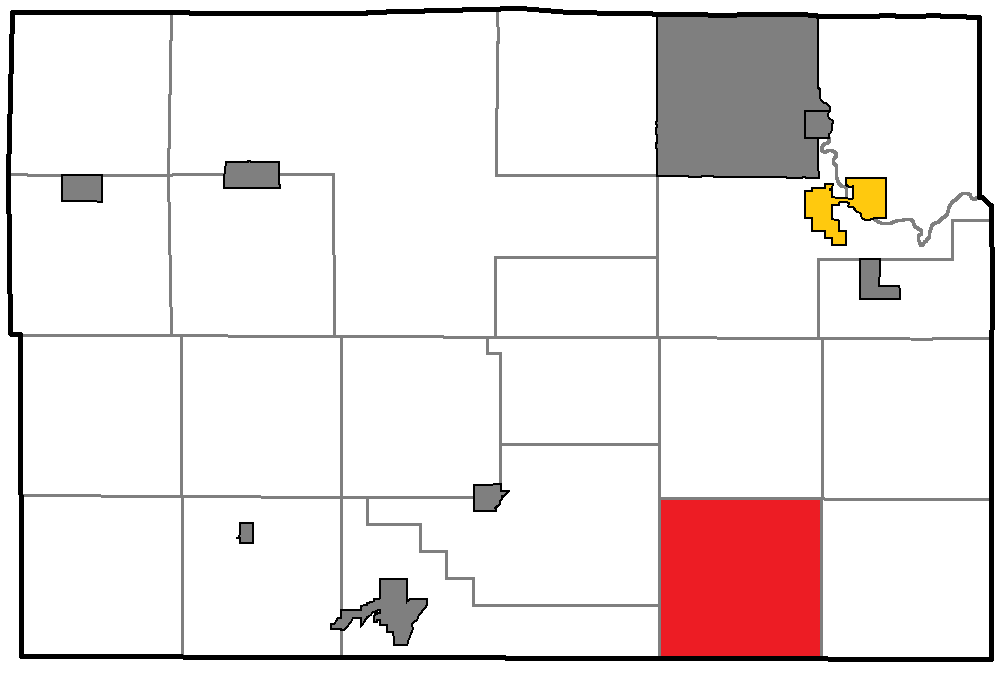
- Location of Clear Creek within Carlton County, Minnesota
- Country: United States
- State: Minnesota
- County: Carlton

Area
  - Total: 36.6 sq mi (95 km^{2})
  - Land: 36.42 sq mi (94.3 km^{2})
  - Water: 0.17 sq mi (0.44 km^{2})

Population (2020)
  - Total: 140
  - Density: 3.8/sq mi (1.5/km^{2})
- Time zone: UTC-6 (Central (CST))
  - Summer (DST): UTC-5 (CDT)
- Area code: 218

Clear Creek is an unorganized territory in Carlton County, Minnesota, United States, located near Holyoke. The population was 140 at the 2020 census.

== Geography ==
According to the United States Census Bureau, the unorganized territory has a total area of 36.6 square miles (94.8 km^{2}), of which 36.5 square miles (94.4 km^{2}) is land and 0.2 square mile (0.4 km^{2}) of it (0.44%) is water.

== Demographics ==
As of the census of 2000, there were 118 people, 48 households, and 33 families residing in the unorganized territory. The population density was 3.2 inhabitants per square mile (1.2/km^{2}). There were 132 housing units at an average density of 3.6 per square mile (1.4/km^{2}). The racial makeup of the unorganized territory was 96.61% White, and 3.39% from two or more races.

There were 48 households, of which 27.1% had children under the age of 18 living with them, 56.3% were married couples living together, 6.3% had a female householder with no husband present, and 29.2% were non-families. 20.8% of all households were made up of individuals, and 2.1% had someone living alone who was 65 years of age or older. The average household size was 2.46 and the average family size was 2.82.

In the unorganized territory the population was spread out, with 23.7% under the age of 18, 4.2% from 18 to 24, 38.1% from 25 to 44, 24.6% from 45 to 64, and 9.3% who were 65 years of age or older. The median age was 40 years. For every 100 females, there were 136.0 males. For every 100 females age 18 and over, there were 125.0 males.

The median income for a household in the unorganized territory was $36,250, and the median income for a family was $40,833. Males had a median income of $41,250 versus $22,500 for females. The per capita income for the unorganized territory was $29,610. There were no families and 3.2% of the population living below the poverty line, including no under eighteens and 10.0% of those over 64.
