= Scotts Corner =

Scotts Corner or variants may refer to the following places in the United States:

- Scotts Corner, California
- Scotts Corner, Delaware
- Scott Corner, Indiana
- Scotts Corner, Minnesota
- Scotts Corner, New Jersey
- Scotts Corner, New York, in Orange County
- Scotts Corners, New York, in Westchester County
- Scotts Corner, Virginia

== See also ==
- Scotch Corner
