= Scotts Corner, Minnesota =

Unincorporated community in Minnesota, US

Scotts Corner
- Unincorporated community
- Location within Minnesota
- Coordinates: 46°35′53″N 92°25′44″W
- Country: United States
- State: Minnesota
- County: Carlton County
- Township: Twin Lakes Township
- Elevation: 1,106 ft (337 m)
- ZIP code: 55707
- Area code: 218
- GNIS feature ID: 0651808

Scotts Corner is an unincorporated community in Twin Lakes Township, Carlton County, Minnesota, United States; located near Wrenshall and Chub Lake.

The community is located three miles southwest of Wrenshall at the intersection of Carlton County Roads 3 and 4.
