= Otter Creek (Saint Louis River tributary) =

Stream in Carlton County, Minnesota, U.S.

Coordinates: 46°39′45″N 92°24′17″W

Otter Creek is a stream in Carlton County, Minnesota, in the United States. It is a tributary of the Saint Louis River.

"Otter Creek" is probably an English translation of the Ojibwe-language name.

== See also ==
- List of rivers of Minnesota
