= Blackhoof Township, Carlton County, Minnesota =

Blackhoof Township, Minnesota
- Township
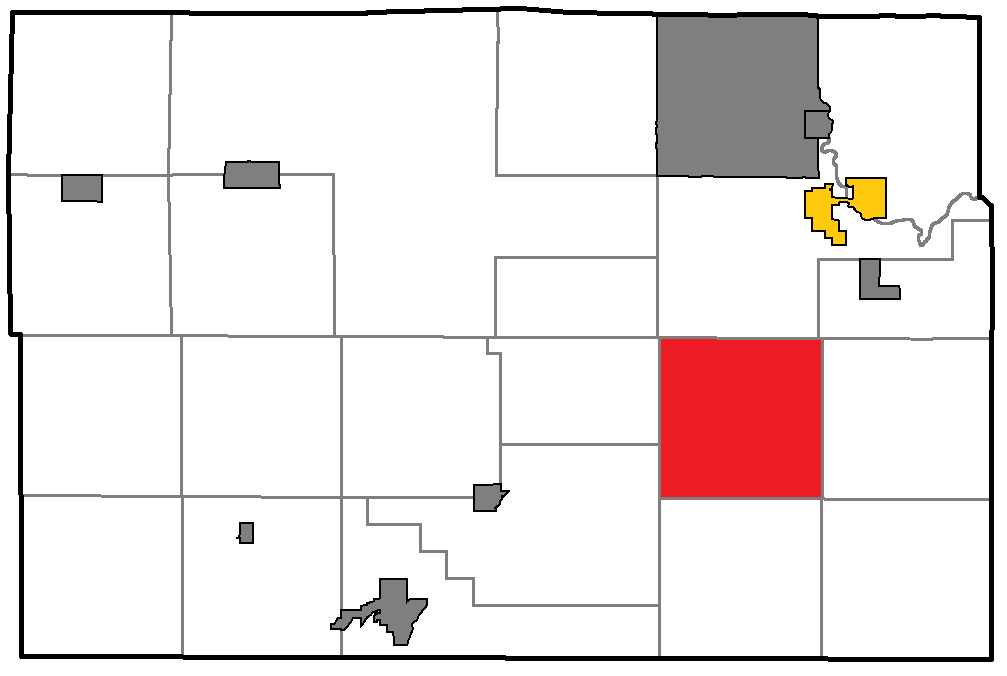
- Location of Blackhoof Township within Carlton County, Minnesota
- Coordinates: 46°32′17″N 92°30′12″W
- Country: United States
- State: Minnesota
- County: Carlton

Area
  - Total: 36.4 sq mi (94.4 km^{2})
  - Land: 36.0 sq mi (93.2 km^{2})
  - Water: 0.46 sq mi (1.2 km^{2})
- Elevation: 1,112 ft (339 m)

Population (2020)
  - Total: 985
  - Density: 27.4/sq mi (10.6/km^{2})
- Time zone: UTC-6 (Central (CST))
  - Summer (DST): UTC-5 (CDT)
- FIPS code: 27-06328
- GNIS feature ID: 0663609

Blackhoof Township is a township in Carlton County, Minnesota, United States. The population was 985 as of the 2020 census. The township took its name from the Blackhoof River.

== Geography ==
According to the United States Census Bureau, the township has a total area of 36.4 square miles (94 km^{2}), of which 36.0 square miles (93 km^{2}) is land and 0.4 square miles (1.0 km^{2}) (1.24%) is water.

=== Unincorporated community ===
- Duesler

=== Lakes ===
- Bear Lake
- Blackhoof Lake
- Ellstrom Lake (east three-quarters)
- Flodeen Lake (vast majority)
- Sandy Lake (east half)
- Spring Lake

=== Adjacent townships ===
- Twin Lakes Township (north)
- Silver Brook Township (northeast)
- Wrenshall Township (east)
- Holyoke Township (southeast)
- Barnum Township (west)
- Mahtowa Township (west)

=== Cemeteries ===
The township contains the following cemeteries: Elim Lutheran and Sandy Lake.

== Demographics ==
At the 2000 census, there were 753 people, 276 households and 221 families residing in the township. The population density was 20.9 people per square mile (8.1/km^{2}). There were 325 housing units at an average density of 9.0/sq mi (3.5/km^{2}). The racial makeup of the township was 98.27% White, 1.20% Native American, 0.13% Asian, 0.13% from other races, and 0.27% from two or more races. Hispanic or Latino of any race were 1.33% of the population.

There were 276 households, of which 35.1% had children under the age of 18 living with them, 73.2% were married couples living together, 4.3% had a female householder with no husband present, and 19.9% were non-families. 15.9% of all households were made up of individuals, and 6.2% had someone living alone who was 65 years of age or older. The average household size was 2.73 and the average family size was 3.02.

Age distribution was 27.1% under the age of 18, 5.3% from 18 to 24, 29.9% from 25 to 44, 27.6% from 45 to 64, and 10.1% who were 65 years of age or older. The median age was 39 years. For every 100 females, there were 103.5 males. For every 100 females age 18 and over, there were 102.6 males.

The median household income was $44,125, and the median family income was $47,500. Males had a median income of $36,719 versus $23,125 for females. The per capita income for the township was $22,021. About 4.2% of families and 5.6% of the population were below the poverty line, including 5.3% of those under age 18 and 3.4% of those age 65 or over.
