= Hanging Horn Lake =

Lake in the state of Minnesota, United States

- Location within Minnesota
- Location: Carlton County, Minnesota
- Coordinates: 46°28′40″N 92°41′41″W
- Type: lake

Hanging Horn Lake is a lake in Carlton County, Minnesota, in the United States.

"Hanging Horn" is probably an English translation of the Ojibwe-language name.

== See also ==
- List of lakes in Minnesota
