= Chub Lake (Carlton County) =

Lake in the state of Minnesota, United States

- Location within Minnesota
- Location: Twin Lakes Township, Carlton County, Minnesota
- Coordinates: 46.624666°N 92.459914°W
- Basin countries: United States
- Surface area: 311 acres (1.3 km^{2})
- Max. depth: 28 ft (8.5 m)
- Surface elevation: 1,121 ft (342 m)

Chub Lake is a lake in Twin Lakes Township, Carlton County, Minnesota, United States. According to the Minnesota Department of Natural Resources (DNR), it has an area of 311 acres (1.26 km^{2}) and a maximum depth of 28 feet (8.5 m). On its North end is Chub Lake Park with its beach and a state owned public boat access. The DNR's information on the lake says that its primary fish species are walleye and largemouth bass.
