= Silver Brook Township, Carlton County, Minnesota =

Silver Brook Township, Minnesota
- Township
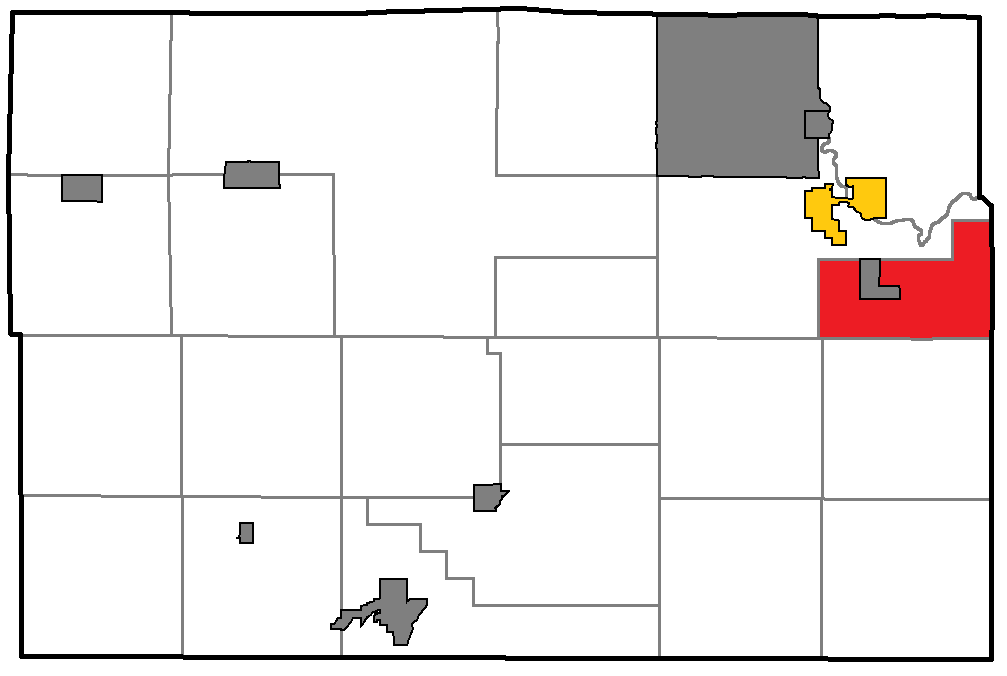
- Location of Silver Brook Township within Carlton County, Minnesota
- Coordinates: 46°36′32″N 92°22′20″W
- Country: United States
- State: Minnesota
- County: Carlton

Area
  - Total: 20.0 sq mi (51.9 km^{2})
  - Land: 20.0 sq mi (51.8 km^{2})
  - Water: 0.039 sq mi (0.1 km^{2})
- Elevation: 997 ft (304 m)

Population (2020)
  - Total: 614
  - Density: 30.7/sq mi (11.9/km^{2})
- Time zone: UTC-6 (Central (CST))
  - Summer (DST): UTC-5 (CDT)
- FIPS code: 27-60268
- GNIS feature ID: 0665612

Silver Brook Township is a township in Carlton County, Minnesota, United States. The population was 614 as of the 2020 census.

== Geography ==
According to the United States Census Bureau, the township has a total area of 20.0 square miles (51.9 km^{2}), of which 20.0 square miles (51.9 km^{2}) is land and 0.04 square miles (0.1 km^{2}) (0.20%) is water.

The city of Wrenshall is located entirely within Silver Brook Township geographically but is a separate entity.

=== Major highway ===
- Minnesota State Highway 23

=== Adjacent townships ===
- Wrenshall Township (south)
- Blackhoof Township (southwest)
- Twin Lakes Township (west)

=== Cemeteries ===
The township contains MacCabee Cemetery.

== Demographics ==
As of the census of 2000, there were 609 people, 209 households, and 173 families residing in the township. The population density was 30.4 inhabitants per square mile (11.7/km^{2}). There were 220 housing units at an average density of 11.0/sq mi (4.2/km^{2}). The racial makeup of the township was 97.37% White, 0.16% African American, 1.31% Native American, 0.16% Asian, and 0.99% from two or more races. Hispanic or Latino of any race were 0.16% of the population. 24.9% were of German, 17.6% Swedish, 15.0% Norwegian, 8.3% Finnish and 5.1% Polish ancestry according to Census 2000.

There were 209 households, out of which 39.2% had children under the age of 18 living with them, 74.6% were married couples living together, 3.3% had a female householder with no husband present, and 17.2% were non-families. 13.9% of all households were made up of individuals, and 5.7% had someone living alone who was 65 years of age or older. The average household size was 2.91 and the average family size was 3.13.

In the township the population was spread out, with 28.2% under the age of 18, 7.7% from 18 to 24, 27.6% from 25 to 44, 25.5% from 45 to 64, and 11.0% who were 65 years of age or older. The median age was 37 years. For every 100 females, there were 103.0 males. For every 100 females age 18 and over, there were 105.2 males.

The median income for a household in the township was $51,875, and the median income for a family was $55,139. Males had a median income of $41,111 versus $30,625 for females. The per capita income for the township was $18,535. About 1.1% of families and 2.5% of the population were below the poverty line, including 4.2% of those under age 18 and none of those age 65 or over.
