= Mahtowa Township, Carlton County, Minnesota =

Mahtowa Township, Minnesota
- Township
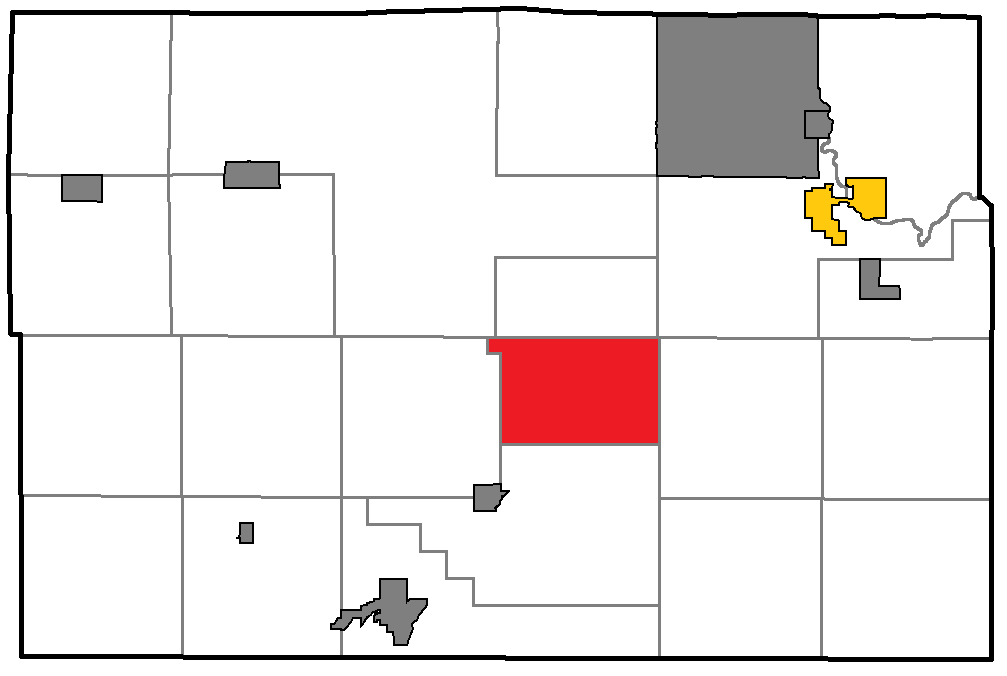
- Location of Mahtowa Township within Carlton County, Minnesota
- Coordinates: 46°34′18″N 92°37′43″W
- Country: United States
- State: Minnesota
- County: Carlton

Area
  - Total: 24.2 sq mi (62.6 km^{2})
  - Land: 23.8 sq mi (61.7 km^{2})
  - Water: 0.35 sq mi (0.9 km^{2})
- Elevation: 1,135 ft (346 m)

Population (2020)
  - Total: 553
  - Density: 23.2/sq mi (8.96/km^{2})
- Time zone: UTC-6 (Central (CST))
  - Summer (DST): UTC-5 (CDT)
- ZIP code: 55707
- Area code: 218
- FIPS code: 27-39464
- GNIS feature ID: 0664877

Mahtowa Township (/ˈmɑːtoʊwə/ MAH-toh-wə) is a township in Carlton County, Minnesota, United States. The population was 553 as of the 2020 census. The name Mahtowa was derived from a Native American term meaning "bear" or "grass lands".

Interstate 35 serves as a main route in the township.

== Geography ==
According to the United States Census Bureau, the township has a total area of 24.1 square miles (62.5 km^{2}), of which 23.8 square miles (61.7 km^{2}) is land and 0.3 square mile (0.9 km^{2}) (1.41%) is water.

=== Unincorporated communities ===
- Mahtowa

=== Major highway ===
- Interstate 35

=== Lakes ===
- Benfield Lake
- Ellstrom Lake (west quarter)
- Flodeen Lake (west edge)
- Hizer Lake
- Katzel Lake (north three-quarters)
- Munson Lake
- Sandy Lake (west half)
- Park Lake

=== Adjacent townships ===
- Atkinson Township (north)
- Twin Lakes Township (northeast)
- Blackhoof Township (east)
- Barnum Township (south)
- Skelton Township (west)

== Demographics ==
As of the census of 2000, there were 494 people, 189 households, and 147 families residing in the township. The population density was 20.7 inhabitants per square mile (8.0/km^{2}). There were 211 housing units at an average density of 8.9 per square mile (3.4/km^{2}). The racial makeup of the township was 96.56% White, 0.20% African American, 1.01% Native American, 0.40% Asian, 0.40% from other races, and 1.42% from two or more races. Hispanic or Latino of any race were 0.61% of the population. 27.1% were of Swedish, 19.3% German, 13.2% Norwegian, 9.2% Finnish, 6.7% English and 5.6% Polish ancestry according to Census 2000.

There were 189 households, out of which 33.3% had children under the age of 18 living with them, 65.1% were married couples living together, 6.9% had a female householder with no husband present, and 22.2% were non-families. 19.6% of all households were made up of individuals, and 9.5% had someone living alone who was 65 years of age or older. The average household size was 2.61 and the average family size was 2.96.

In the township the population was spread out, with 24.7% under the age of 18, 7.1% from 18 to 24, 26.3% from 25 to 44, 29.6% from 45 to 64, and 12.3% who were 65 years of age or older. The median age was 41 years. For every 100 females, there were 101.6 males. For every 100 females age 18 and over, there were 100.0 males.

The median income for a household in the township was $43,750, and the median income for a family was $53,750. Males had a median income of $42,375 versus $24,531 for females. The per capita income for the township was $17,832. About 5.0% of families and 4.1% of the population were below the poverty line, including 0.8% of those under age 18 and 8.7% of those age 65 or over.
