= Atkinson Township, Carlton County, Minnesota =

Atkinson Township, Minnesota
- Township
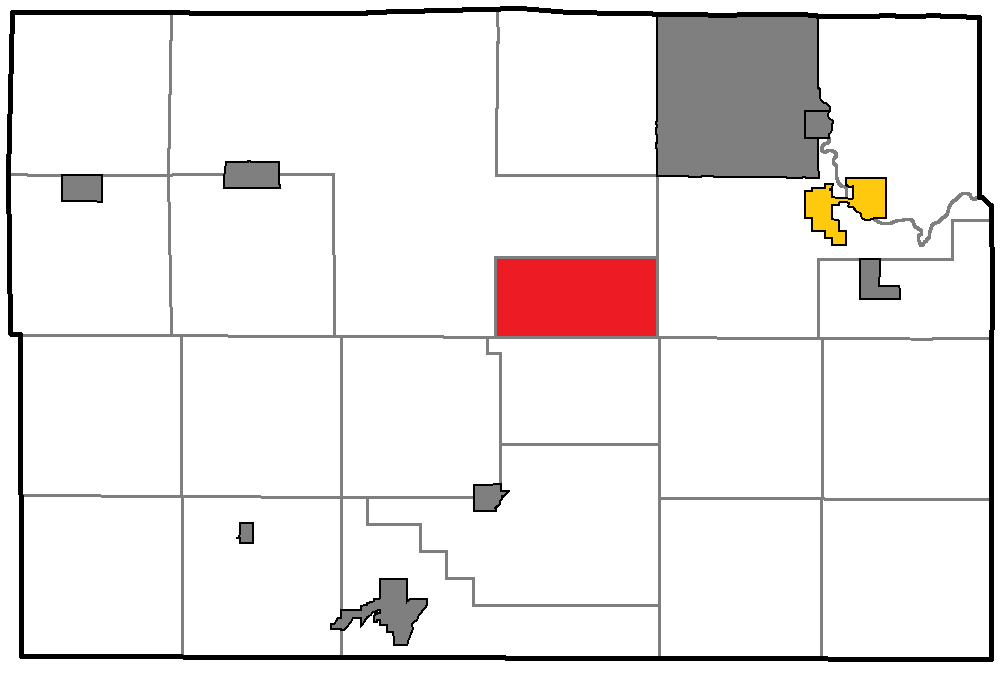
- Location of Atkinson Township within Carlton County, Minnesota
- Coordinates: 46°35′51″N 92°36′49″W
- Country: United States
- State: Minnesota
- County: Carlton

Area
  - Total: 18.1 sq mi (47.0 km^{2})
  - Land: 17.4 sq mi (45.0 km^{2})
  - Water: 0.77 sq mi (2.0 km^{2})
- Elevation: 1,204 ft (367 m)

Population (2020)
  - Total: 400
  - Density: 23/sq mi (8.9/km^{2})
- Time zone: UTC-6 (Central (CST))
  - Summer (DST): UTC-5 (CDT)
- FIPS code: 27-02656
- GNIS feature ID: 0663472

Atkinson Township is a township in Carlton County, Minnesota, United States. The population was 400 as of the 2020 census.

== History ==
Atkinson Township was named for John Atkinson, a local settler and railroad employee.

== Geography ==
According to the United States Census Bureau, the township has a total area of 18.2 square miles (47 km^{2}), of which 17.4 square miles (45 km^{2}) is land and 0.8 square miles (2.1 km^{2}) (4.35%) is water.

=== Unincorporated community ===
- Atkinson

=== Major highways ===
- Interstate 35

=== Lakes ===
- Bob Lake (vast majority)
- Park Lake

=== Adjacent townships ===
- Twin Lakes Township (east)
- Mahtowa Township (south)

=== Cemeteries ===
The township contains the following cemeteries: Bethel and Salem.

== Demographics ==
As of the census of 2000, there were 319 people, 124 households, and 93 families residing in the township. The population density was 18.4 inhabitants per square mile (7.1/km^{2}). There were 198 housing units at an average density of 11.4 per square mile (4.4/km^{2}). The racial makeup of the township was 98.12% White, 0.31% Native American, 0.94% Asian, and 0.63% from two or more races. 24.6% were of German, 18.0% Swedish, 15.8% Norwegian, 9.2% Finnish, 7.0% Polish and 6.6% English ancestry according to Census 2000.

There were 124 households, out of which 28.2% had children under the age of 18 living with them, 66.1% were married couples living together, 5.6% had a female householder with no husband present, and 24.2% were non-families. 19.4% of all households were made up of individuals, and 5.6% had someone living alone who was 65 years of age or older. The average household size was 2.57 and the average family size was 2.96.

In the township the population was spread out, with 22.6% under the age of 18, 5.6% from 18 to 24, 31.0% from 25 to 44, 26.0% from 45 to 64, and 14.7% who were 65 years of age or older. The median age was 40 years. For every 100 females, there were 100.6 males. For every 100 females age 18 and over, there were 107.6 males.

The median income for a household in the township was $49,375, and the median income for a family was $55,875. Males had a median income of $40,000 versus $32,500 for females. The per capita income for the township was $18,479. None of the families and 0.6% of the population were living below the poverty line, including no under eighteens and none of those over 64.
