= Carlton County Courthouse =

- Carlton County Historic Courthouse
- U.S. National Register of Historic Places
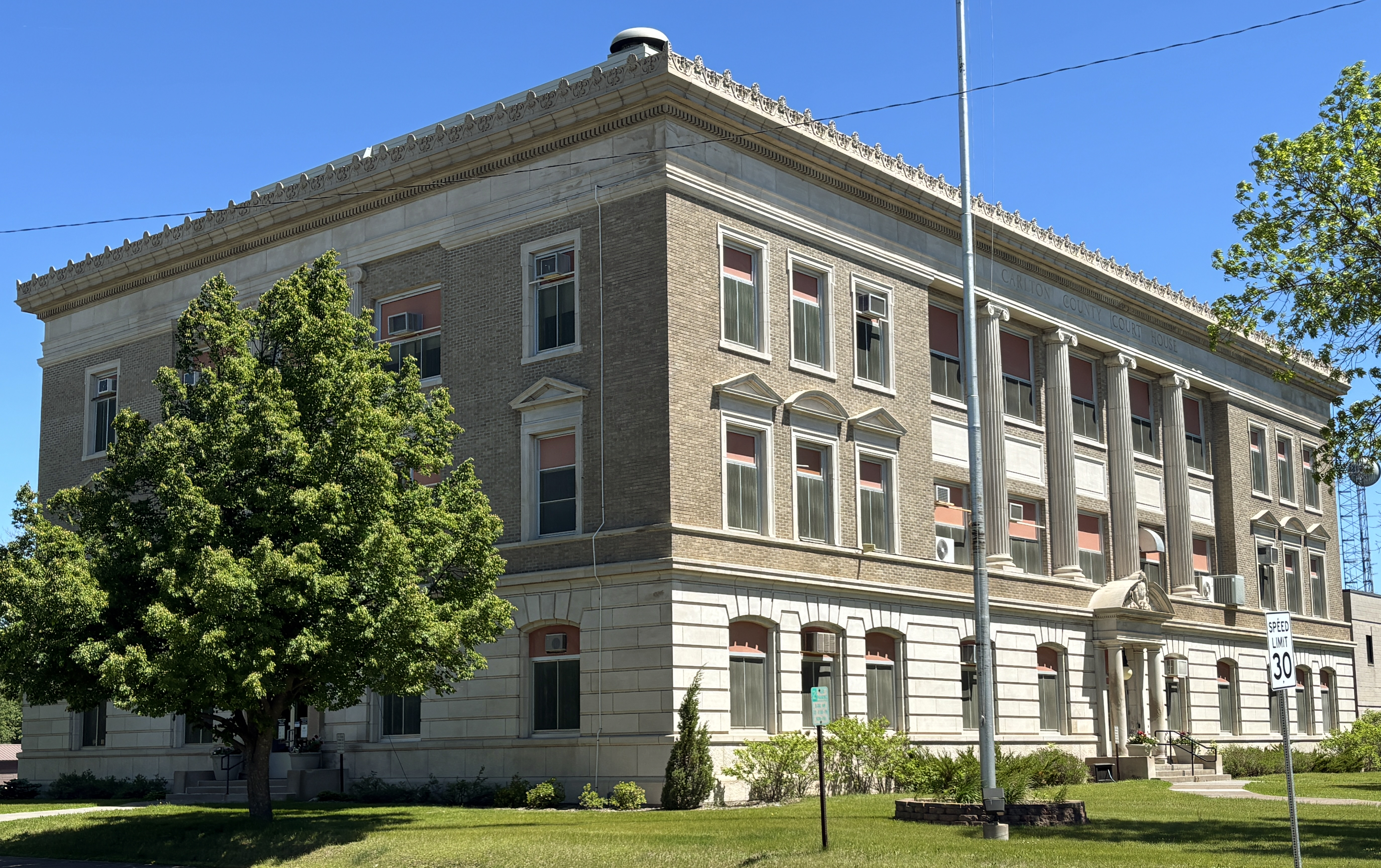

- Location within Minnesota Location within the United States
- Interactive map showing the location of Carlton County Courthouse
- Location: 301 Walnut Ave. Carlton, Minnesota
- Coordinates: 46°39′53.99″N 92°25′27.58″W
- Built: 1922
- Architect: Clyde Kelly; Niebuhr Co.
- Architectural style: Renaissance Revival
- NRHP reference No.: 85001926
- Added to NRHP: August 29, 1985

The Carlton County Historic Courthouse in downtown Carlton, Minnesota, United States, is the county seat of Carlton County, Minnesota. The newer Justice Center is located at 1780 Justice Drive, Carlton, Minnesota

== History ==
The county seat was originally located at Scott's corner stage coach location, then moved to Thomson, with a jail located at the town of Northern Pacific Junction (later name changed to Carlton in 1881). In 1890, residents of Carlton raised funds to build a courthouse, which was a two-story brick building with a high-pitched gable roof. The current building took about two years to build, being completed in 1924. It is a three-story building with cream-colored brick and stone.

The Carlton County Vidette praised Clyde Kelly, the architect, with these words: "Unquestionably, the man who assumes the responsibility of being the architect for a building like this is entitled to great consideration. To him is left the superintending of the placing of every stock and stone in the building ... to make the structure as perfect as possible."

The building was built with Indiana limestone, brick, and terracotta for exterior portions, originally crowned by a roof of olive green Ludowici roof tiles. The building underwent further renovations in later decades, including a major expansion with an adjacent Law Enforcement Center in 1978 and a new Justice Center at 1780 Justice Drive opening in 2024. Subsequent improvements have included the addition of security cameras and key cards.
