= Atkinson, Minnesota =

Unincorporated community in Minnesota, US

Atkinson
- Unincorporated community
- Location within Minnesota
- Coordinates: 46°36′44″N 92°33′56″W
- Country: United States
- State: Minnesota
- County: Carlton County
- Township: Atkinson Township
- Elevation: 1,142 ft (348 m)
- ZIP code: 55718
- Area code: 218
- GNIS feature ID: 0639496

Atkinson is an unincorporated community in Atkinson Township, Carlton County, Minnesota, United States.

The community is located between Cloquet and Mahtowa at the intersection of Carlton County Road 61 and County Road 144.

Interstate 35 and State Highway 210 (MN 210) are nearby. Atkinson is located 8 miles southwest of Cloquet.
