= Venoah Lake =

Lake in the state of Minnesota, United States

- Location within Minnesota
- Location: Carlton County, Minnesota
- Coordinates: 46°37′16″N 92°26′25″W
- Type: lake

Venoah Lake is a lake in Carlton County, Minnesota, in the United States.

Venoah is a construct of the nicknames of Winona and Marie, the daughters of a settler.

== See also ==
- List of lakes in Minnesota
