= Carlton High School =

Public high school in Minnesota, United States

Coordinates: 46.6652778°N 92.4227778°W

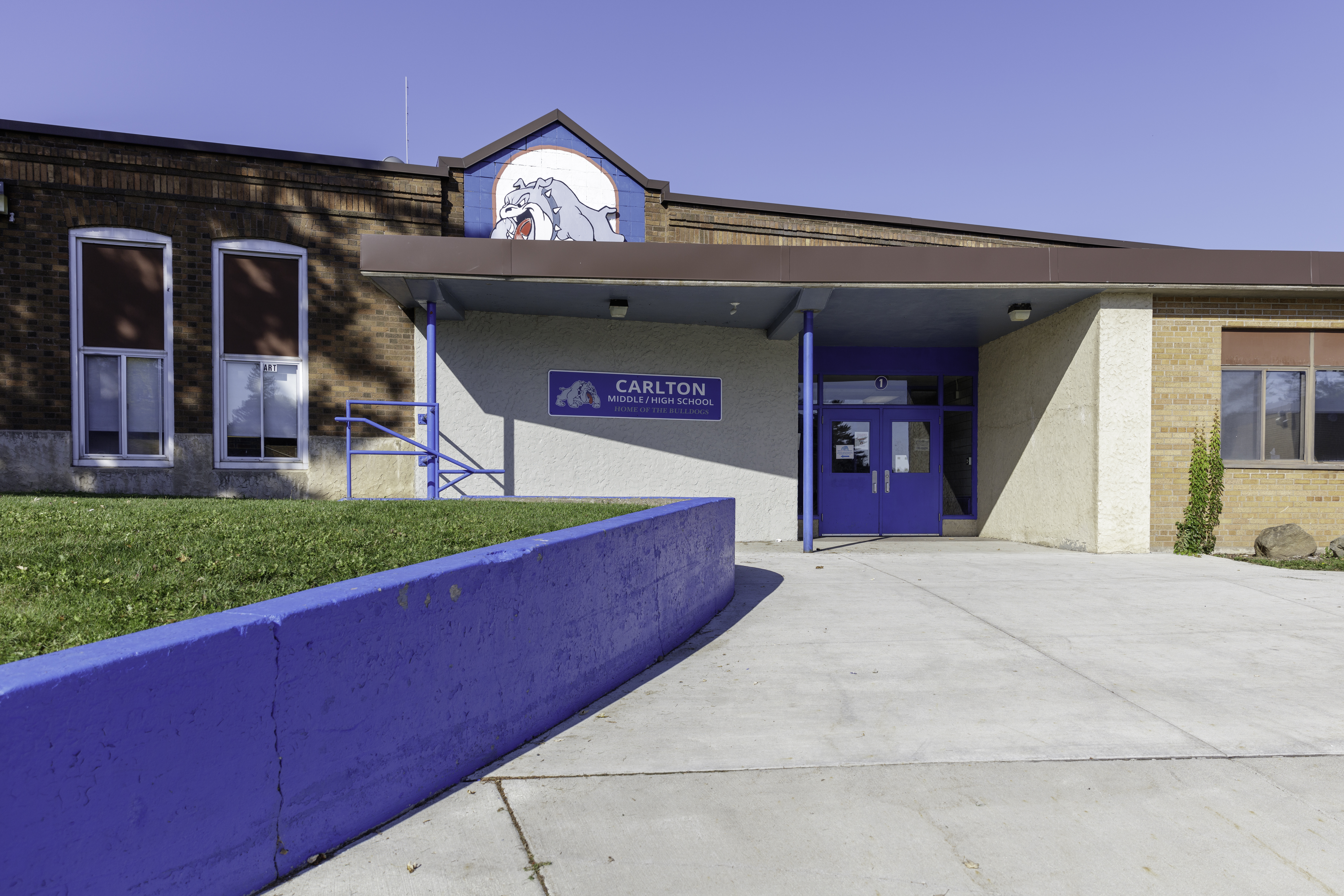
- Carlton High School
- 405 School Avenue, Carlton, Minnesota 55718; United States

Information
- Type: Public high school
- Motto: Go Dogs!
- School district: Carlton School District
- Superintendent: Gwen Carman
- Teaching staff: 9.73 (FTE)
- Grades: 6–12
- Enrollment: 145 (2024-2025)
- Student to teacher ratio: 14.90
- Campus type: Semi-Open Campus
- Colors: Blue and White
- Team name: Bulldogs
- Website: www.carlton.k12.mn.us

Carlton High School is a public high school located in Carlton, Minnesota, United States.

The school operates under the Carlton Public School District, housing grades 6 through 12. It serves a population of approximately 350 students. The school competes athletically in region 7A of the Minnesota State High School League; its colors are blue and white, and its mascot is the Bulldog.
