= Silas Chapman =

American politician

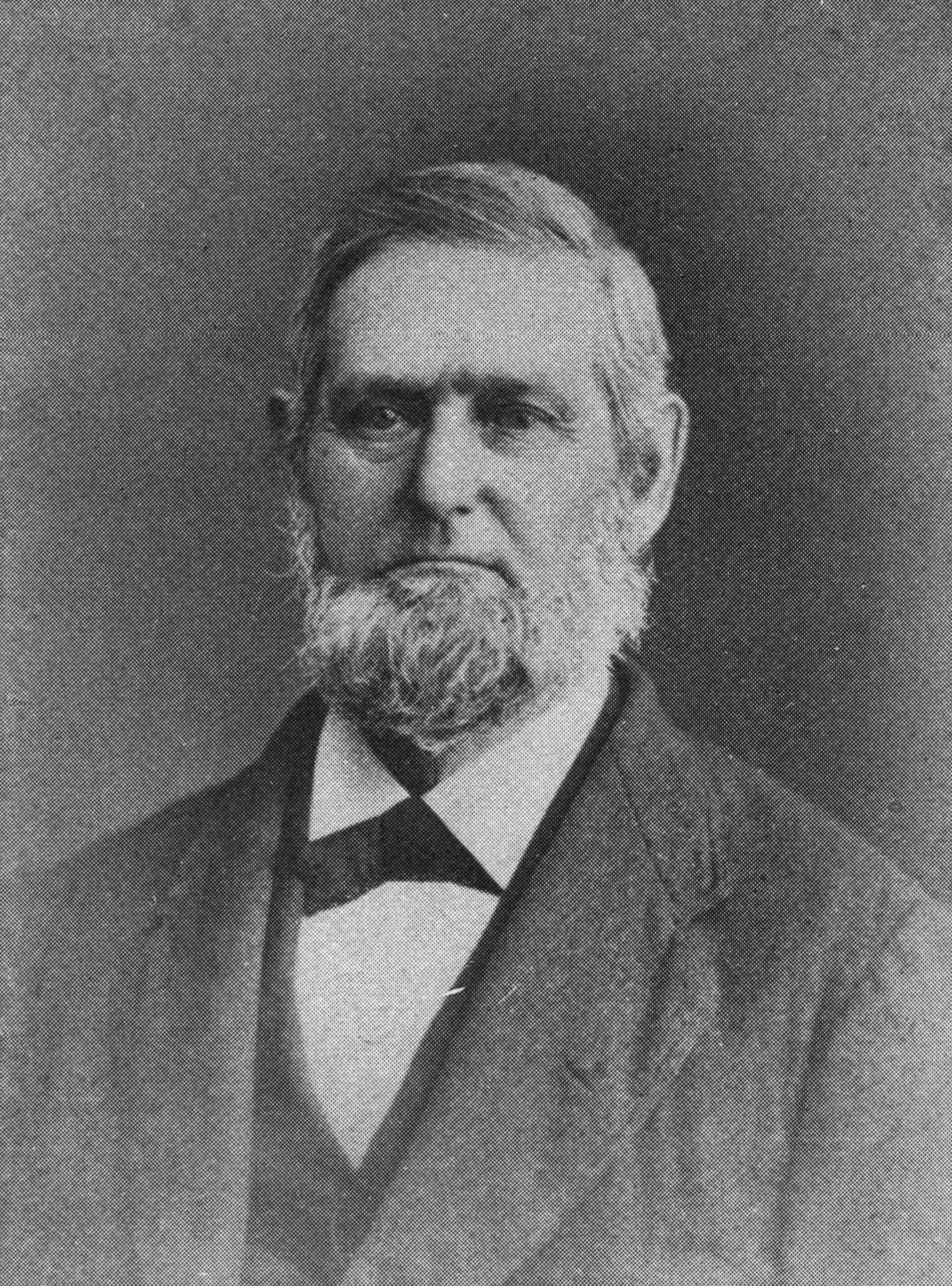
- Born: June 9, 1813; Southampton, Massachusetts
- Died: December 14, 1899 (aged 86); Milwaukee, Wisconsin
- Occupations: Educator, map publisher
- Known for: Popular maps of the upper Midwest in the era of rapid settlement

Silas Chapman (June 9, 1813 – December 14, 1899) was a Milwaukee map and book publisher known primarily for his maps of the upper Midwest, which were influential at a pivotal time of the settlement of that region. When he arrived in Milwaukee harbor in 1841, there were 2,000 inhabitants, the roads were crude, most of the area was oak prairie, and the towns of the region had not yet been settled. Within 20 years, with the help of an influx of skilled engravers, especially from Germany, his firm was producing fine detailed maps, many of which became collector's items. He published 55 different maps during his life. An 1880s map of Milwaukee sold 100,000 copies, at a time when the population of the city was 150,000.

== Life and career ==
Chapman was born in Southampton, Massachusetts. He learned the printer's trade working for the Springfield Republican. In 1836 he spent a year at New York University, and then taught school for four years, before moving to Prairieville, (now Waukesha), Wisconsin Territory, in 1841. His introduction to map publishing came when he and Philetus C. Hale published Increase Lapham's famous early maps of Wisconsin. By 1850, he had branched out on his own.

Chapman was most well known as a map publisher. However, he was an educator in his early career, and remained heavily involved in the support of education throughout his life, even after his professional focus changed. He was a Commissioner of the Milwaukee Public Schools from 1856-1859 . When the office of the Superintendent of Public Instruction was inaugurated he was offered the position but declined. Later he was a member of the first Wisconsin State Normal School Board of Trustees.

Chapman was generally a notable citizen of Milwaukee, known as a living historian who could recount important details about early Milwaukee life, particularly in the rapid growth period of the 1840s and 1850s and the transition to statehood. When he died in 1899 the news was carried on the front page of the Milwaukee Journal.

== Works of Silas Chapman ==
=== Books ===
- Chapman, Silas (1871). The Forest Home cemetery, Milwaukee, Wis., with a map of the grounds. Milwaukee: Godfrey & Crandall's book printing house.
- Chapman, Silas (1855). Hand Book of Wisconsin; or, Guide to Travellers [sic] & Immigrants. Milwaukee: S. Chapman.
- Chapman, Silas (1856). Hand Book of Wisconsin; 2d ed., enlarged & improved. Milwaukee: S. Chapman.

=== Maps ===
- Chapman's rail road map of Ohio, Indiana, Michigan, Illinois, Missouri, Minnesota, & Wisconsin (Map). 1859.
- Chapman's new sectional map of Minnesota (Map). Milwaukee: Dyer & Pasmore. 1856.
