= Holyoke, Minnesota =

Unincorporated community in Minnesota, US

Holyoke
- Unincorporated community
- Location within Minnesota
- Coordinates: 46°28′03″N 92°23′19″W
- Country: United States
- State: Minnesota
- County: Carlton County
- Township: Holyoke Township
- Elevation: 1,033 ft (315 m)
- ZIP code: 55749
- Area code: 218
- GNIS feature ID: 0645142

Holyoke is an unincorporated community in Holyoke Township, Carlton County, Minnesota, United States. It is located between Sandstone and Duluth.

Carlton County Road 8 and State Highway 23 (MN 23) are two of the main routes in the community.

Holyoke is located 13 miles south of Wrenshall. The Nemadji State Forest is nearby. The communities of Nickerson, MN and Foxboro, WI are near Holyoke.
