= Iverson, Minnesota =

Unincorporated community in Minnesota, US

Iverson
- Unincorporated community
- Location within Minnesota
- Coordinates: 46°39′59″N 92°31′46″W
- Country: United States
- State: Minnesota
- County: Carlton County
- Township: Twin Lakes Township
- Elevation: 1,230 ft (375 m)
- ZIP code: 55718
- Area code: 218
- GNIS feature ID: 0645547

Iverson is an unincorporated community in Twin Lakes Township, Carlton County, Minnesota, United States.

The community is located between Carlton and Cromwell on State Highway 210 (MN 210), near Interstate 35.

Iverson is located five miles west-southwest of Cloquet. Black Bear Casino Resort is nearby.

== History ==
A post office was established at Iverson in 1909, and remained in operation until it was discontinued in 1927. The community was named for Ole Iverson, an early settler.
