= Mahtowa, Minnesota =

Census-designated place in Minnesota, US

Mahtowa
- Census-designated place (CDP) and Unincorporated community
- Location within Minnesota
- Coordinates: 46°34′26″N 92°37′55″W
- Country: United States
- State: Minnesota
- County: Carlton County
- Township: Mahtowa Township

Area
  - Total: 10.60 sq mi (27.45 km^{2})
  - Land: 10.59 sq mi (27.43 km^{2})
  - Water: 0.0077 sq mi (0.02 km^{2})
- Elevation: 1,152 ft (351 m)

Population (2020)
  - Total: 332
  - Density: 31/sq mi (12.1/km^{2})
- ZIP code: 55707
- Area code: 218
- GNIS feature ID: 0647392

Mahtowa (/ˈmɑːtoʊwə/ MAH-toh-wə) is an unincorporated community and census-designated place (CDP) in Mahtowa Township, Carlton County, Minnesota, United States. As of the 2020 census, its population was 332.

The community is located between Cloquet and Moose Lake, near the junction of Interstate 35 and Carlton County Road 4.

County Road 4 and County Road 61 are two of the main routes in Mahtowa.

Mahtowa is located 13 miles southwest of Cloquet. Mahtowa is located 11 miles northeast of Moose Lake, 32 miles southwest of Duluth.

Historical population
Census	Pop.	Note	%±
1880	143		—
2010	370		—
2020	332		−10.3%
U.S. Decennial Census
