= Wrenshall, Minnesota =

City in Minnesota, United States

Wrenshall
- City
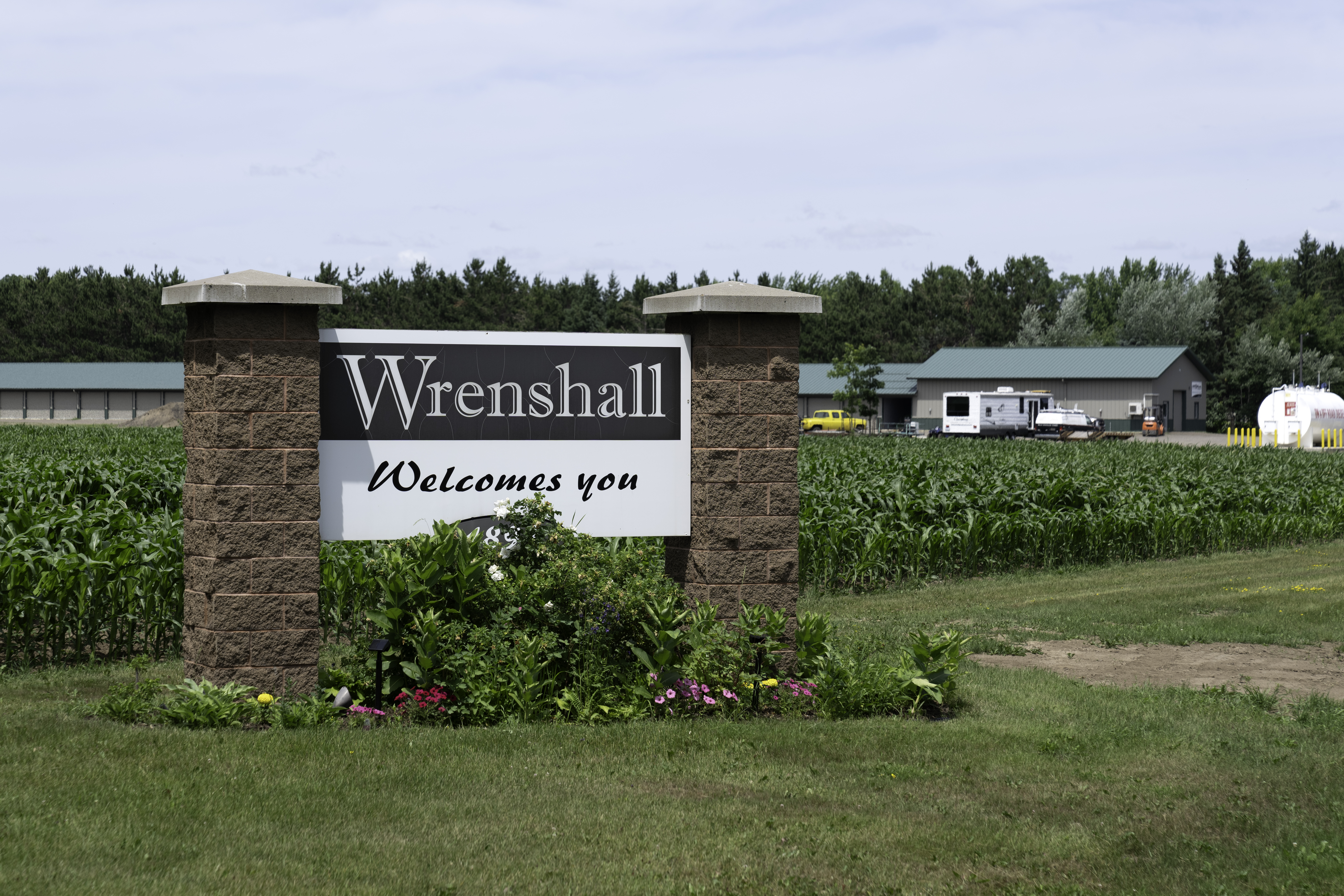

- Location of the city of Wrenshall within Carlton County, Minnesota
- Coordinates: 46°37′14″N 92°23′13″W
- Country: United States
- State: Minnesota
- County: Carlton

Area
  - Total: 1.49 sq mi (3.86 km^{2})
  - Land: 1.49 sq mi (3.86 km^{2})
  - Water: 0 sq mi (0.00 km^{2})
- Elevation: 1,040 ft (317 m)

Population (2020)
  - Total: 428
  - Density: 287.1/sq mi (110.85/km^{2})
- Time zone: UTC-6 (Central (CST))
  - Summer (DST): UTC-5 (CDT)
- ZIP codes: 55749, 55797
- Area code: 218
- FIPS code: 27-71788
- GNIS feature ID: 0654392
- Website: https://www.cityofwrenshall.com/

Wrenshall is a city in Carlton County, Minnesota, United States. It was originally a brickyard. The population was 428 at the 2020 census. Wrenshall is located just south of Jay Cooke State Park.

== Geography ==
According to the United States Census Bureau, the city has a total area of 1.50 square miles (3.88 km^{2}), all land.

Wrenshall is located nine miles southeast of the city of Cloquet; and 25 miles southwest of the city of Duluth.

Carlton County Roads 1, 4, and 18 are three of the main routes in Wrenshall.

State Highways 45 and 210 at nearby Carlton are four miles north of Wrenshall. State Highway 23 at Silver Brook Township is 2.5 miles east of Wrenshall.

Access from nearby Interstate 35 to Wrenshall is via two different locations. State Highways 45 or 210 exits to County Road 1 at Carlton is one alternative; or the County Road 4 exit at nearby Mahtowa is the other.

== Demographics ==
Historical population
| Census | Pop. | Note | %± |
|---|---|---|---|
| 1930 | 186 | | — |
| 1940 | 168 | | −9.7% |
| 1950 | 148 | | −11.9% |
| 1960 | 189 | | 27.7% |
| 1970 | 147 | | −22.2% |
| 1980 | 333 | | 126.5% |
| 1990 | 296 | | −11.1% |
| 2000 | 308 | | 4.1% |
| 2010 | 399 | | 29.5% |
| 2020 | 428 | | 7.3% |
U.S. Decennial Census

=== 2010 census ===
As of the census of 2010, there were 399 people, 154 households, and 114 families living in the city. The population density was 266.0 inhabitants per square mile (102.7/km^{2}). There were 160 housing units at an average density of 106.7 per square mile (41.2/km^{2}). The racial makeup of the city was 96.0% White, 1.8% Native American, and 2.3% from two or more races.

There were 154 households, of which 31.2% had children under the age of 18 living with them, 59.1% were married couples living together, 11.7% had a female householder with no husband present, 3.2% had a male householder with no wife present, and 26.0% were non-families. 20.8% of all households were made up of individuals, and 7.1% had someone living alone who was 65 years of age or older. The average household size was 2.53 and the average family size was 2.94.

The median age in the city was 43.5 years. 25.1% of residents were under the age of 18; 6.2% were between the ages of 18 and 24; 22.2% were from 25 to 44; 32.1% were from 45 to 64; and 14.5% were 65 years of age or older. The gender makeup of the city was 48.9% male and 51.1% female.

=== 2000 census ===
As of the census of 2000, there were 308 people, 111 households, and 88 families living in the city. The population density was 204.3 inhabitants per square mile (78.9/km^{2}). There were 120 housing units at an average density of 79.6 per square mile (30.7/km^{2}). The racial makeup of the city was 96.43% White, 2.27% Native American, and 1.30% from two or more races. Hispanic or Latino of any race were 0.97% of the population. 21.1% were of German, 20.7% Norwegian, 11.3% Finnish, 10.9% Polish and 10.5% Swedish ancestry.

There were 111 households, out of which 44.1% had children under the age of 18 living with them, 63.1% were married couples living together, 16.2% had a female householder with no husband present, and 20.7% were non-families. 14.4% of all households were made up of individuals, and 3.6% had someone living alone who was 65 years of age or older. The average household size was 2.77 and the average family size was 3.09.

In the city, the population was spread out, with 32.5% under the age of 18, 6.5% from 18 to 24, 32.8% from 25 to 44, 19.8% from 45 to 64, and 8.4% who were 65 years of age or older. The median age was 34 years. For every 100 females, there were 83.3 males. For every 100 females age 18 and over, there were 90.8 males.

The median income for a household in the city was $39,643, and the median income for a family was $41,875. Males had a median income of $33,438 versus $19,643 for females. The per capita income for the city was $21,510. None of the families and 2.6% of the population were living below the poverty line.

== Education ==
Wrenshall is served by the Wrenshall School District. The school's mascot is the wren. Mostly all sports are now combined with Carlton and are now going by the Carlton Wrenshall raptors.
