= Carlton County, Minnesota =

County in Minnesota, United States

- County
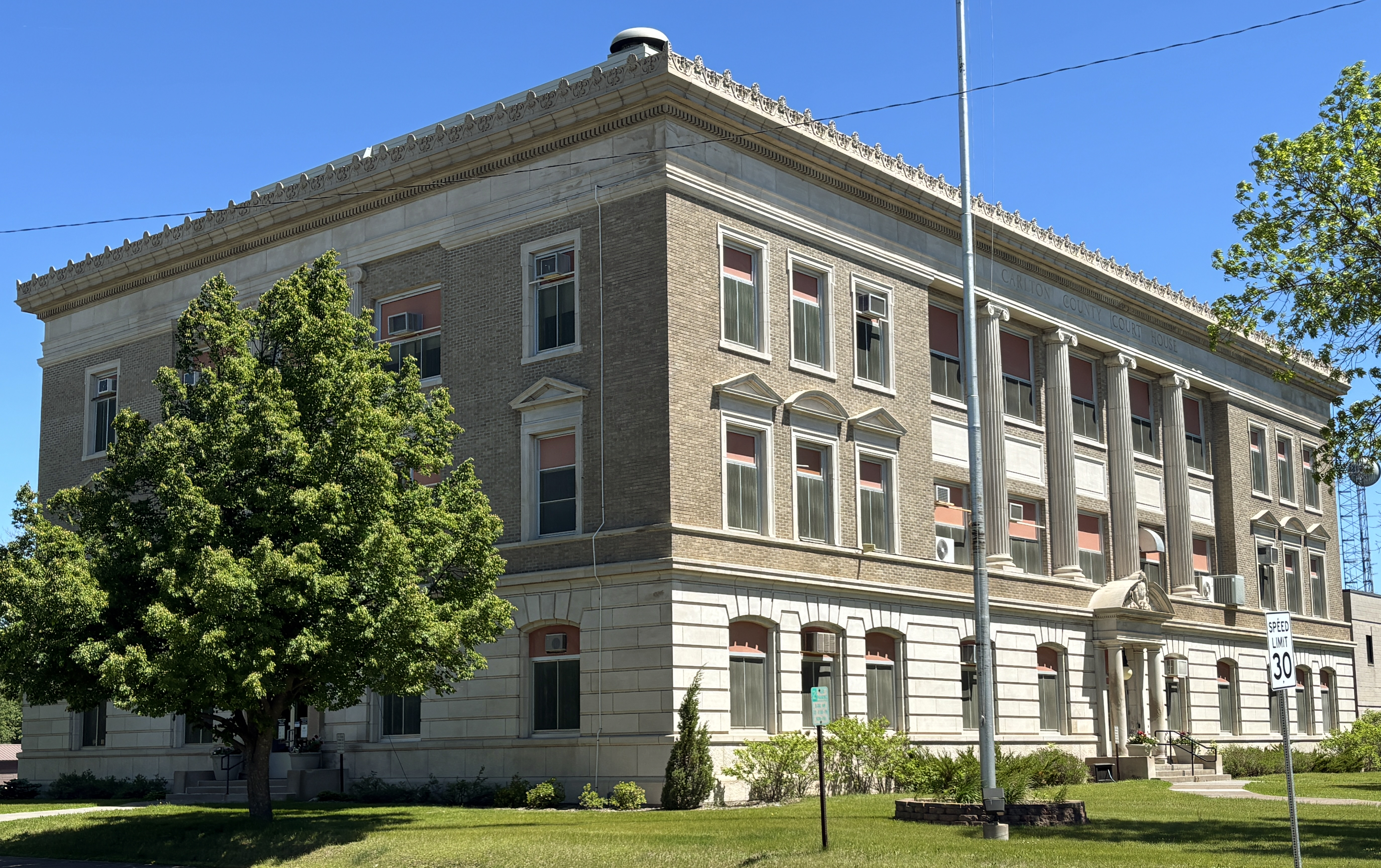
- Carlton County Courthouse

- Location within the U.S. state of Minnesota
- Coordinates: 46°35′N 92°41′W
- Country: United States
- State: Minnesota
- Created: May 23, 1857
- Organized: 1870
- Named for: Reuben B. Carlton
- Seat: Carlton
- Largest city: Cloquet

Area
  - Total: 875 sq mi (2,270 km^{2})
  - Land: 861 sq mi (2,230 km^{2})
  - Water: 14 sq mi (36 km^{2}) 1.6%

Population (2020)
  - Total: 36,207
  - Estimate (2025): 36,711 ▲
  - Density: 42.1/sq mi (16.3/km^{2})
- Time zone: UTC−6 (Central)
  - Summer (DST): UTC−5 (CDT)
- Congressional district: 8th
- Website: www.carltoncountymn.gov

Carlton County is a county in the State of Minnesota, formed in 1857. As of the 2020 census, the population was 36,207. Its county seat is Carlton. Part of the Fond du Lac Indian Reservation lies in northeastern Carlton County.

Carlton County is part of the Duluth, MN–WI Metropolitan Statistical Area.

== Geography ==
Carlton County lies on Minnesota's eastern edge. Its eastern boundary abuts Wisconsin. The Saint Louis River flows east-southeast through the county, discharging into Lake Superior. The Moose Horn River flows southwest through the county, discharging into the Kettle River. The Nemadji River and the South Fork Nemadji River flow east through the county, meeting a few miles east of its eastern boundary before reaching Lake Superior. The county terrain consists of low rolling hills, heavily wooded, and slopes to the several river valleys. The county's northwest corner lies at 1,329 ft (405 m) ASL, and a small hill 0.2 miles (0.32 km) west of Rogers Lake rises to 1,450 ft (440 m) ASL.

The county has an area of 875 square miles (2,270 km^{2}), of which 861 square miles (2,230 km^{2}) is land and 14 square miles (36 km^{2}) (1.6%) is water.

=== Major highways ===
- Interstate 35
- Minnesota State Highway 23
- Minnesota State Highway 27
- Minnesota State Highway 33
- Minnesota State Highway 45
- Minnesota State Highway 73
- Minnesota State Highway 210
- Minnesota State Highway 289

=== Adjacent counties ===
- Saint Louis County – north
- Douglas County, Wisconsin – east
- Pine County – south
- Aitkin County – west

=== Protected areas ===
- Black Hoof Wildlife Management Area
- Dye State Wildlife Management Area
- Fond du Lac State Forest (part)
- Jay Cooke State Park
- Kettle Lake State Wildlife Management Area
- Nemadji State Forest (part)
- Sawyer State Wildlife Management Area

== History ==
Under a 1854 Treaty of La Pointe the Fond du Lac Indian Reservation and other reservations were established in exchange for all the Lake Superior Ojibwe land in the Arrowhead Region. Carlton County was formed and organized in 1870. It was named for Reuben B. Carlton, a member of the Minnesota Senate (1857–58).

In October 1918, an immense forest fire occurred, known as the Cloquet fire. The Carlton County Historical Society hosts a permanent exhibit about the fire of 1918, along with ones about the Ojibwe of Carlton County and the Logging Era.

== Climate and weather ==
Carlton, Minnesota

Climate chart (precipitation, max. and min. temperature)
J	F	M	A	M	J	J	A	S	O	N	D
1 20 1	0.9 27 6	1.5 38 17	2.3 54 29	3.2 67 39	4.2 75 48	4.2 80 54	4 78 53	4.3 68 45	3.1 54 34	2 37 22	1.1 23 7
- █ Average max. and min. temperatures in °F
- █ Precipitation totals in inches
- Source: The Weather Channel
Metric conversion
J	F	M	A	M	J	J	A	S	O	N	D
24 −7 −17	22 −3 −14	38 3 −8	59 12 −2	82 19 4	108 24 9	107 27 12	102 26 12	110 20 7	79 12 1	50 3 −6	29 −5 −14
- █ Average max. and min. temperatures in °C
- █ Precipitation totals in mm

In recent years, average temperatures in the county seat of Carlton have ranged from a low of 1 °F (−17 °C) in January to a high of 80 °F (27 °C) in July, although a record low of −45 °F (−43 °C) was recorded in January 1912 and a record high of 105 °F (41 °C) was recorded in July 1936. Average monthly precipitation ranged from 0.87 inches (22 mm) in February to 4.34 inches (110 mm) in September.

== Demographics ==
Historical population
Census	Pop.	Note	%±
1860	51		—
1870	286		460.8%
1880	1,230		330.1%
1890	5,272		328.6%
1900	10,017		90.0%
1910	17,559		75.3%
1920	19,391		10.4%
1930	21,232		9.5%
1940	24,212		14.0%
1950	24,584		1.5%
1960	27,932		13.6%
1970	28,072		0.5%
1980	29,936		6.6%
1990	29,259		−2.3%
2000	31,671		8.2%
2010	35,386		11.7%
2020	36,207		2.3%
2025 (est.)	36,711	▲	1.4%
U.S. Decennial Census; 1790-1960 1900-1990; 1990-2000 2010-2020

=== Racial and ethnic composition ===
Carlton County, Minnesota – Racial and ethnic composition Note: the US Census treats Hispanic/Latino as an ethnic category. This table excludes Latinos from the racial categories and assigns them to a separate category. Hispanics/Latinos may be of any race.
Race / Ethnicity (NH = Non-Hispanic)	Pop 1980	Pop 1990	Pop 2000	Pop 2010	Pop 2020	% 1980	% 1990	% 2000	% 2010	% 2020
White alone (NH)	28,965	27,750	28,907	31,458	30,910	96.76%	94.84%	91.27%	88.90%	85.37%
Black or African American alone (NH)	29	43	297	494	556	0.10%	0.15%	0.94%	1.40%	1.54%
Native American or Alaska Native alone (NH)	818	1,291	1,621	2,012	2,148	2.73%	4.41%	5.12%	5.69%	5.93%
Asian alone (NH)	47	75	112	160	153	0.16%	0.26%	0.35%	0.45%	0.42%
Native Hawaiian or Pacific Islander alone (NH)	x	x	2	2	12	x	x	0.01%	0.01%	0.03%
Other race alone (NH)	9	1	14	9	85	0.03%	0.00%	0.04%	0.03%	0.23%
Mixed race or Multiracial (NH)	x	x	452	767	1,731	x	x	1.43%	2.17%	4.78%
Hispanic or Latino (any race)	68	99	266	484	612	0.23%	0.34%	0.84%	1.37%	1.69%
Total	29,936	29,259	31,671	35,386	36,207	100.00%	100.00%	100.00%	100.00%	100.00%

=== 2020 census ===
As of the 2020 census, the county had a population of 36,207. The median age was 42.0 years. 22.4% of residents were under the age of 18 and 18.7% of residents were 65 years of age or older. For every 100 females there were 109.2 males, and for every 100 females age 18 and over there were 109.7 males age 18 and over.

The racial makeup of the county was 86.0% White, 1.6% Black or African American, 6.1% American Indian and Alaska Native, 0.4% Asian, <0.1% Native Hawaiian and Pacific Islander, 0.5% from some other race, and 5.4% from two or more races. Hispanic or Latino residents of any race comprised 1.7% of the population.

36.5% of residents lived in urban areas, while 63.5% lived in rural areas.

There were 13,789 households in the county, of which 29.8% had children under the age of 18 living in them. Of all households, 51.0% were married-couple households, 18.4% were households with a male householder and no spouse or partner present, and 22.4% were households with a female householder and no spouse or partner present. About 27.5% of all households were made up of individuals and 12.0% had someone living alone who was 65 years of age or older.

There were 15,688 housing units, of which 12.1% were vacant. Among occupied housing units, 79.9% were owner-occupied and 20.1% were renter-occupied. The homeowner vacancy rate was 0.7% and the rental vacancy rate was 5.9%.

=== 2010 census ===
As of the census of 2010, there were 35,386 people living in the county. 89.7% were White, 5.9% Native American, 1.4% Black or African American, 0.5% Asian, 0.2% of some other race and 2.4% of two or more races. 1.4% were Hispanic or Latino (of any race). 16.4% were of German, 13.5% Finnish, 8.9% Norwegian, 8.6% Swedish and 5.6% American ancestry.

=== 2000 census ===
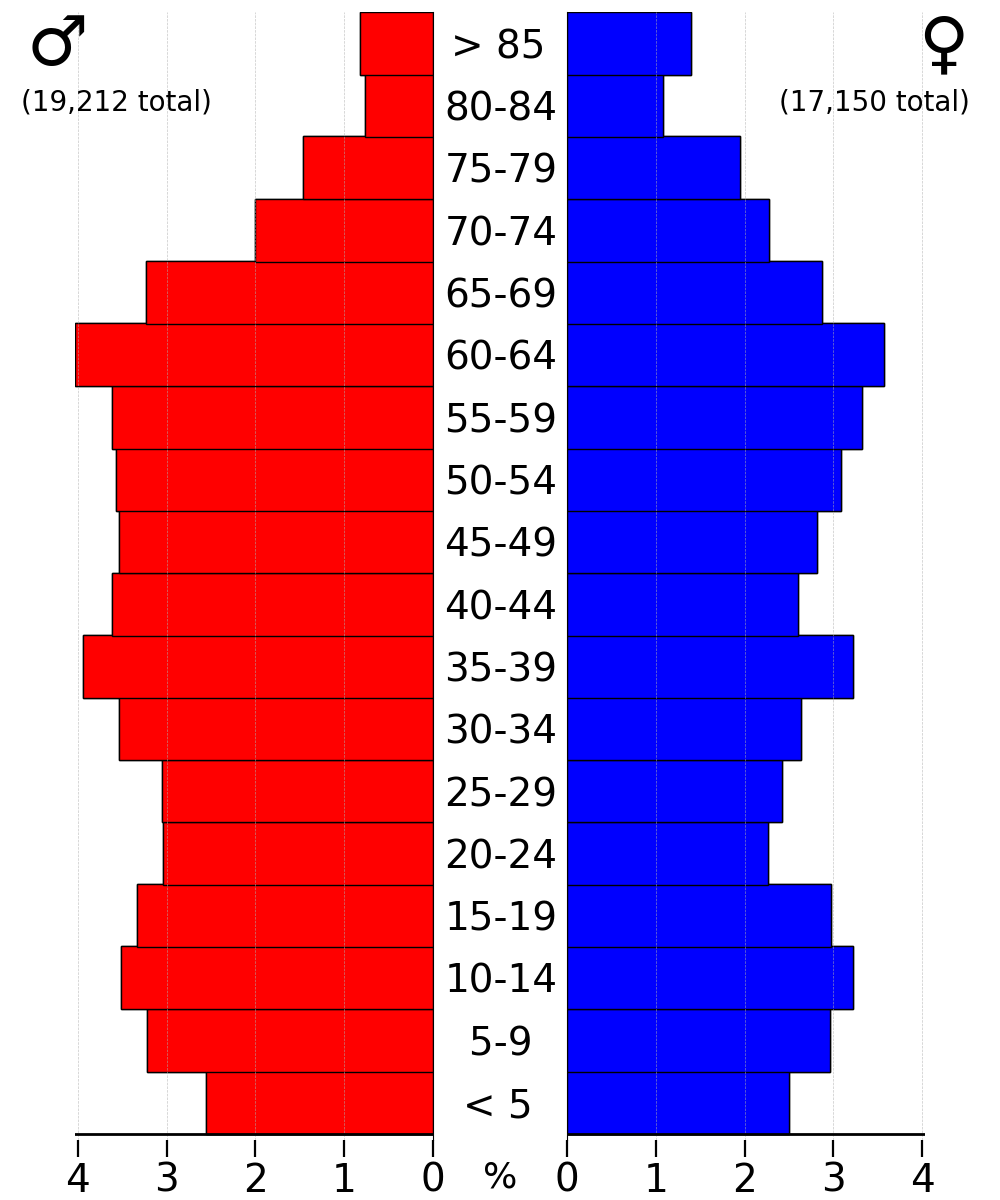
2022 US Census population pyramid for Carlton County, from ACS 5-year estimates

As of the census of 2000, there were 31,671 people, 12,064 households, and 8,408 families in the county. The population density was 36.8 per square mile (14.2/km^{2}). There were 13,721 housing units at an average density of 15.9 per square mile (6.1/km^{2}). The racial makeup of the county was 91.75% White, 0.97% Black or African American, 5.19% Native American, 0.35% Asian, 0.01% Pacific Islander, 0.21% from other races, and 1.52% from two or more races. 0.84% of the population were Hispanic or Latino of any race. 18.5% were of German, 16.9% Finnish, 12.5% Norwegian, 11.8% Swedish and 5.8% Polish ancestry. 95.5% spoke English, 1.8% Finnish and 1.1% Spanish as their first language.

There were 12,064 households, out of which 32.60% had children under the age of 18 living with them, 56.50% were married couples living together, 9.00% had a female householder with no husband present, and 30.30% were non-families. 26.10% of all households were made up of individuals, and 12.00% had someone living alone who was 65 years of age or older. The average household size was 2.50 and the average family size was 3.00.

The county population contained 25.40% under the age of 18, 7.70% from 18 to 24, 28.40% from 25 to 44, 23.50% from 45 to 64, and 15.10% who were 65 years of age or older. The median age was 38 years. For every 100 females there were 102.70 males. For every 100 females age 18 and over, there were 102.20 males.

The median income for a household in the county was $40,021, and the median income for a family was $48,406. Males had a median income of $38,788 versus $25,555 for females. The per capita income for the county was $18,073. About 5.40% of families and 7.90% of the population were below the poverty line, including 8.20% of those under age 18 and 9.30% of those age 65 or over.

== Communities ==
=== Cities ===
- Barnum
- Carlton (county seat)
- Cloquet
- Cromwell
- Kettle River
- Moose Lake
- Scanlon
- Wrenshall
- Wright

=== Census-designated places ===
- Big Lake
- Esko
- Mahtowa

=== Unincorporated communities ===
- Atkinson
- Automba
- Duesler
- Harney
- Holyoke
- Iverson
- Nemadji
- Otter Creek
- Pleasant Valley
- Sawyer
- Scotts Corner

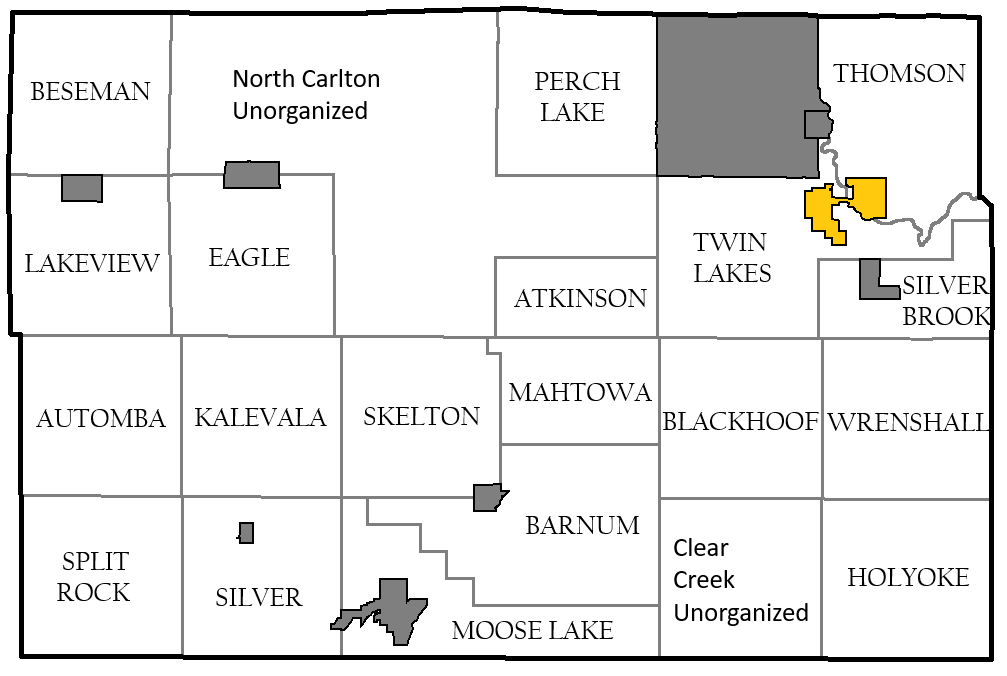
Townships and unorganized territories of Carlton County

=== Townships ===
- Atkinson Township
- Automba Township
- Barnum Township
- Beseman Township
- Blackhoof Township
- Eagle Township
- Holyoke Township
- Kalevala Township
- Lakeview Township
- Mahtowa Township
- Moose Lake Township
- Perch Lake Township
- Silver Township
- Silver Brook Township
- Skelton Township
- Split Rock Township
- Thomson Township
- Twin Lakes Township
- Wrenshall Township

=== Unorganized territories ===
- Clear Creek
- North Carlton Includes Corona, Progress, Red Clover, and Sawyer Unorganized Townships.

== Government and politics ==
=== Local government ===
As of 2025, the Carlton County Sheriff is Kelly Lake. Lake has served as Sheriff since April 2005. The Carlton County Board of Commissioners has five members, each representing one district. In April 2019, Sheriff Lake and the Fond du Lac Police Department collaborated on sex trafficking training on behalf of other sheriff agencies that would be affected by the upcoming Enbridge Line 3. In 2017, Carlton County published a detailed Jail & Criminal Justice System Planning Study. As of 2019, Carlton County Public Health employs 36 county staff and 6 contract staff. It has been operating since 1920.

=== National ===
The Democratic Party historically dominated the county, carrying it by wide margins in every presidential election from 1932 to 2012, but Donald Trump lost by only 300 votes in 2016 and 307 votes in 2020 (a margin of under 2% and holding the Democrats to only a plurality in both elections), signaling a new competitiveness in Carlton County. The only other Republican to receive at least 40% of the vote since 1932 was Richard Nixon during his 49-state landslide in 1972. During the 2022 Midterm Elections, the Republican candidates for Attorney General, State Auditor, and U.S. House of Representatives won Carlton County, and Republicans also flipped State House District 11A, which includes most of Carlton County and came among other seat flips on the Iron Range despite not winning the State House overall. These wins marked a potential realignment towards the Republican Party. This trend continued in 2024, with Donald Trump becoming the first Republican since Herbert Hoover in 1928 to win the county, receiving 50.1% of the vote.

United States presidential election results for Carlton County, Minnesota
Year	Republican		Democratic		Third party(ies)	
Year	No.	%	No.	%	No.	%
1892	737	58.49%	370	29.37%	153	12.14%
1896	1,169	67.15%	543	31.19%	29	1.67%
1900	1,119	68.78%	467	28.70%	41	2.52%
1904	1,480	76.92%	236	12.27%	208	10.81%
1908	1,487	62.37%	506	21.22%	391	16.40%
1912	283	10.94%	631	24.39%	1,673	64.67%
1916	1,096	40.18%	1,115	40.87%	517	18.95%
1920	2,833	59.47%	1,152	24.18%	779	16.35%
1924	3,142	49.76%	303	4.80%	2,869	45.44%
1928	4,582	64.01%	2,138	29.87%	438	6.12%
1932	3,336	42.56%	3,586	45.75%	916	11.69%
1936	2,163	22.82%	7,136	75.29%	179	1.89%
1940	3,400	31.87%	7,159	67.09%	111	1.04%
1944	2,653	29.96%	6,153	69.48%	50	0.56%
1948	2,742	27.00%	6,967	68.59%	448	4.41%
1952	4,175	39.03%	6,432	60.12%	91	0.85%
1956	4,168	39.04%	6,484	60.73%	25	0.23%
1960	4,613	37.74%	7,576	61.98%	35	0.29%
1964	2,780	22.49%	9,552	77.29%	27	0.22%
1968	3,016	25.10%	8,538	71.04%	464	3.86%
1972	5,445	42.77%	7,116	55.90%	169	1.33%
1976	4,371	31.33%	9,247	66.28%	334	2.39%
1980	4,760	32.09%	8,822	59.48%	1,251	8.43%
1984	4,877	34.34%	9,189	64.70%	137	0.96%
1988	4,626	34.12%	8,790	64.82%	144	1.06%
1992	3,922	26.60%	7,736	52.46%	3,089	20.95%
1996	4,034	28.99%	8,052	57.87%	1,829	13.14%
2000	5,578	36.99%	8,620	57.16%	883	5.86%
2004	6,642	36.23%	11,462	62.52%	230	1.25%
2008	6,549	35.50%	11,501	62.34%	399	2.16%
2012	6,586	35.72%	11,389	61.78%	461	2.50%
2016	8,160	44.81%	8,460	46.46%	1,591	8.74%
2020	9,791	48.07%	10,098	49.58%	480	2.36%
2024	10,435	50.13%	9,905	47.59%	475	2.28%

County Board of Commissioners
Position	Name	District	Next Election
Commissioner	Sarah Plante Buhs	District 1	2028
Commissioner and Chair (2025)	Marv Bodie	District 2	2026
Commissioner and Vice Chair (2025)	Thomas R. Proulx	District 3	2028
Commissioner	Susan Zmyslony	District 4	2026
Commissioner	Dan Reed	District 5	2028

State Legislature (2023-2025)
Position	Name	Affiliation	District
Senate	Jason Rarick	Republican	District 11
House of Representatives	Jeff Dotseth	Republican	District 11A

U.S Congress (2023-2025)
Position	Name	Affiliation	District
House of Representatives	Pete Stauber	Republican	8th
Senate	Amy Klobuchar	Democrat	N/A
Senate	Tina Smith	Democrat	N/A

== See also ==
- National Register of Historic Places listings in Carlton County, Minnesota
