= Barnum, Minnesota =

City in Minnesota, United States

Barnum
- City
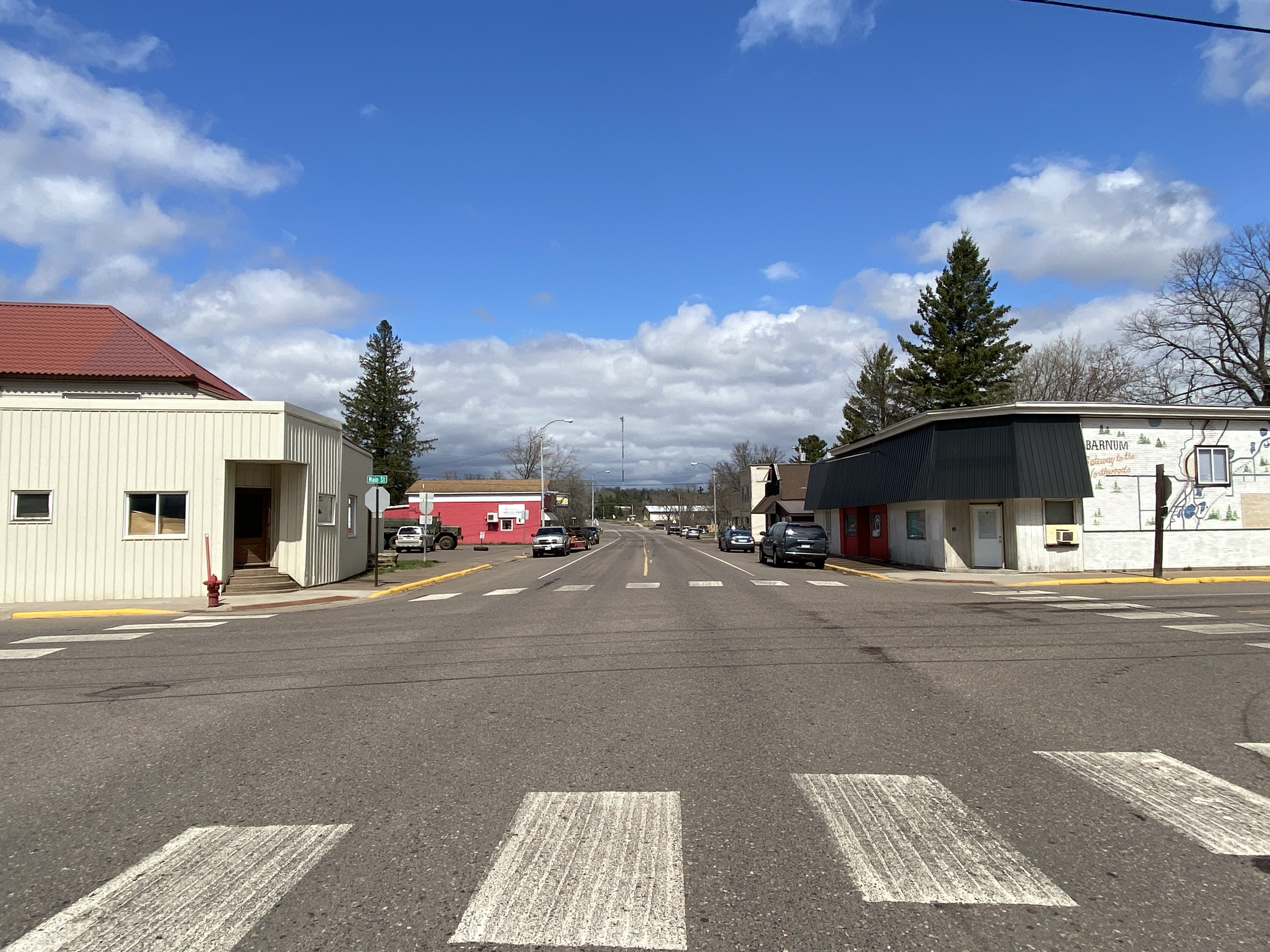
- Commercial area at Main Street

- Location of the city of Barnum within Carlton County, Minnesota
- Coordinates: 46°30′15″N 92°41′26″W
- Country: United States
- State: Minnesota
- County: Carlton

Area
  - Total: 1.01 sq mi (2.61 km^{2})
  - Land: 1.01 sq mi (2.61 km^{2})
  - Water: 0 sq mi (0.00 km^{2})
- Elevation: 1,106 ft (337 m)

Population (2020)
  - Total: 620
  - Density: 614.6/sq mi (237.29/km^{2})
- Time zone: UTC-6 (Central (CST))
  - Summer (DST): UTC-5 (CDT)
- ZIP code: 55707
- Area code: 218
- FIPS code: 27-03628
- GNIS feature ID: 0639642
- Website: barnummn.us

Barnum is a city in Carlton County, Minnesota, United States. The population was 620 at the 2020 census.

Interstate Highway 35, Carlton County Road 6 (Main Street), and Carlton County Road 61 (Front Street) are three of the main routes in Barnum.

== Geography ==
According to the United States Census Bureau, the city has an area of 1.01 square miles (2.62 km^{2}), all land. It is five miles northeast of Moose Lake and 33 miles southwest of Duluth.

== Community ==
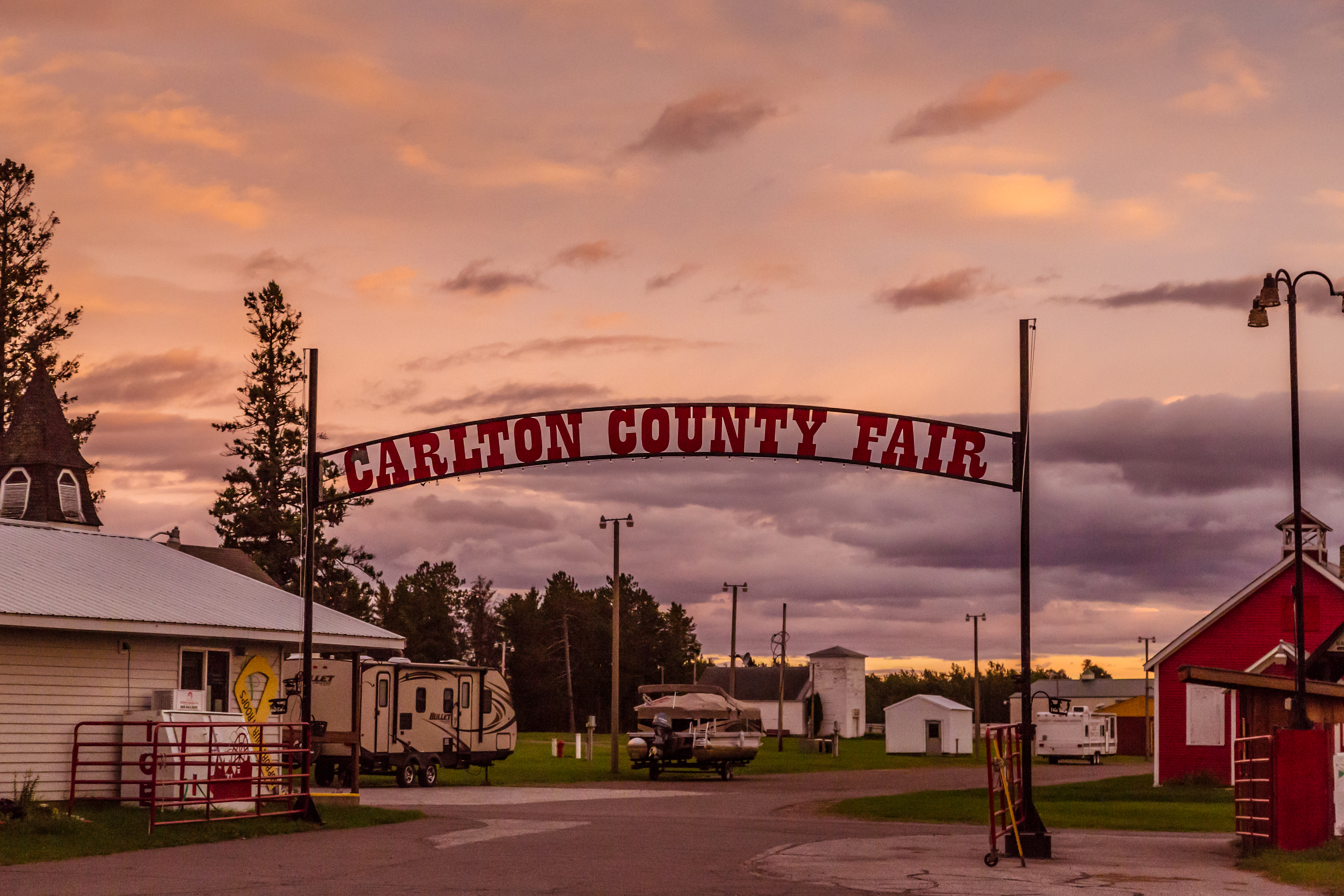
Carlton County Fair entrance

=== Carlton County Fair ===
Barnum is the home of the Carlton County Fair. The Fair takes place annually in August, having been first founded in 1890. The Carlton County Agricultural and Industrial Society owns and operates the fairgrounds. The fair features livestock shows, agricultural exhibits, carnival rides, live music, and a demolition derby. There is also a potato path exhibit that showcases farm equipment used for planting and harvesting potatoes. The Carlton County Historical Society operates several buildings at the fairgrounds including a large machinery building and a historic log cabin.

=== Schools ===
Barnum is also home to the Barnum elementary and Barnum high school.

== Demographics ==
Historical population
Census	Pop.	Note	%±
1880	49		—
1890	417		751.0%
1900	391		−6.2%
1910	262		−33.0%
1920	242		−7.6%
1930	271		12.0%
1940	327		20.7%
1950	344		5.2%
1960	417		21.2%
1970	382		−8.4%
1980	464		21.5%
1990	482		3.9%
2000	525		8.9%
2010	613		16.8%
2020	620		1.1%
U.S. Decennial Census

=== 2010 census ===
As of the census of 2010, there were 613 people, 236 households, and 152 families living in the city. The population density was 613.0 inhabitants per square mile (236.7/km^{2}). There were 264 housing units at an average density of 264.0 per square mile (101.9/km^{2}). The racial makeup of the city was 92.0% White, 0.3% African American, 2.4% Native American, 0.2% Asian, and 5.1% from two or more races. Hispanic or Latino of any race were 0.8% of the population.

There were 236 households, of which 38.6% had children under the age of 18 living with them, 46.2% were married couples living together, 12.7% had a female householder with no husband present, 5.5% had a male householder with no wife present, and 35.6% were non-families. 30.9% of all households were made up of individuals, and 14.9% had someone living alone who was 65 years of age or older. The average household size was 2.57 and the average family size was 3.24.

The median age in the city was 35.2 years. 32.5% of residents were under the age of 18; 5.6% were between the ages of 18 and 24; 27.6% were from 25 to 44; 21.4% were from 45 to 64; and 13.1% were 65 years of age or older. The gender makeup of the city was 46.7% male and 53.3% female.

=== 2000 census ===
As of the census of 2000, there were 525 people, 226 households, and 138 families living in the city. The population density was 519.7 inhabitants per square mile (200.7/km^{2}). There were 249 housing units at an average density of 246.5 per square mile (95.2/km^{2}). The racial makeup of the city was 97.33% White, 1.52% Native American, and 1.14% from two or more races. Hispanic or Latino of any race were 0.19% of the population. 20.0% were of Norwegian, 17.2% German, 13.0% American, 11.7% Swedish and 6.7% Finnish ancestry according to Census 2000.

There were 226 households, out of which 34.5% had children under the age of 18 living with them, 43.4% were married couples living together, 14.2% had a female householder with no husband present, and 38.9% were non-families. 31.0% of all households were made up of individuals, and 16.4% had someone living alone who was 65 years of age or older. The average household size was 2.32 and the average family size was 2.96.

In the city, the population was spread out, with 29.1% under the age of 18, 8.8% from 18 to 24, 30.1% from 25 to 44, 16.8% from 45 to 64, and 15.2% who were 65 years of age or older. The median age was 33 years. For every 100 females, there were 94.4 males. For every 100 females age 18 and over, there were 84.2 males.

The median income for a household in the city was $31,518, and the median income for a family was $40,625. Males had a median income of $34,375 versus $21,250 for females. The per capita income for the city was $14,621. About 7.4% of families and 9.4% of the population were below the poverty line, including 10.8% of those under age 18 and 8.0% of those age 65 or over.

== Gallery ==
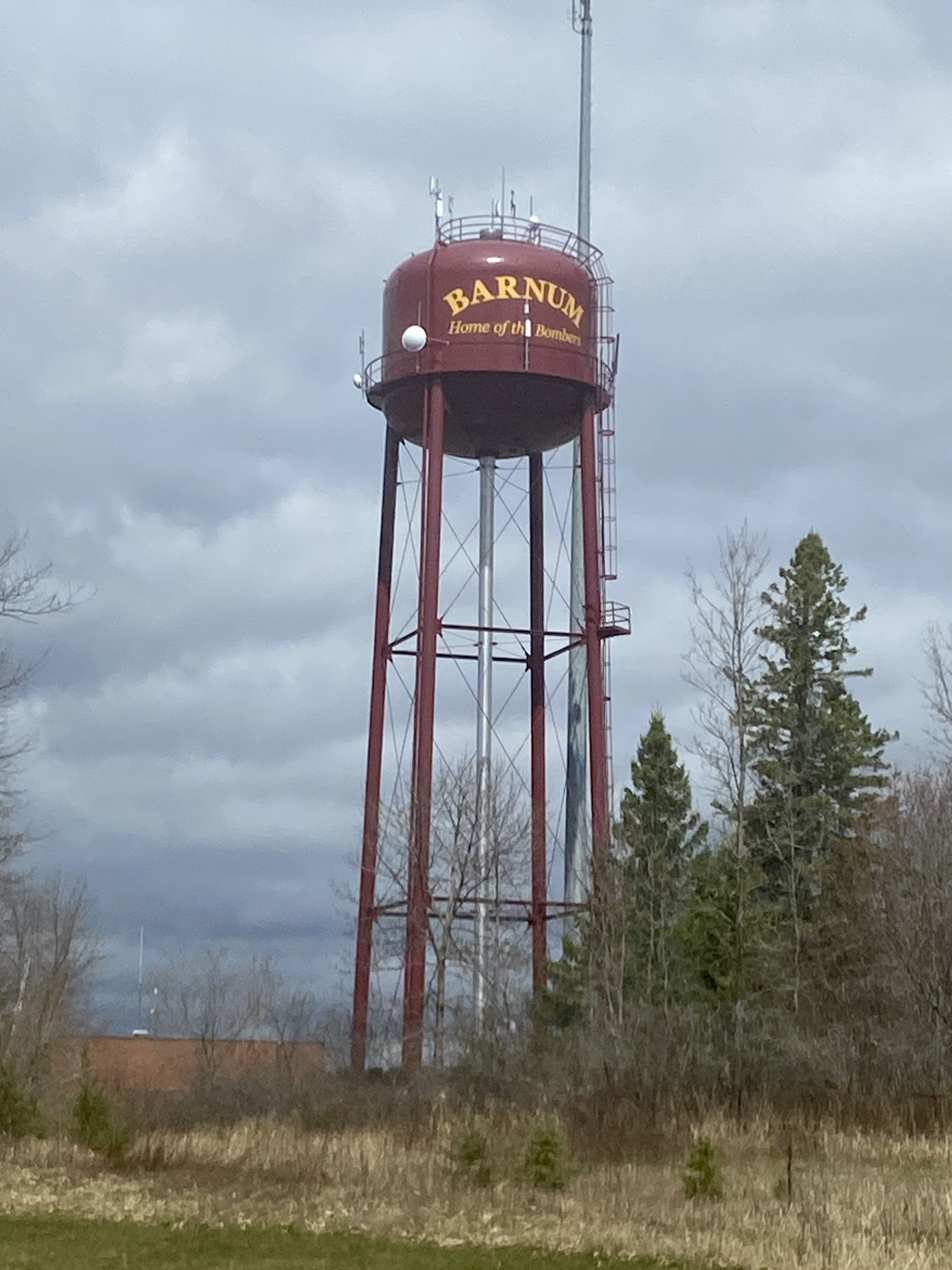
Water tower

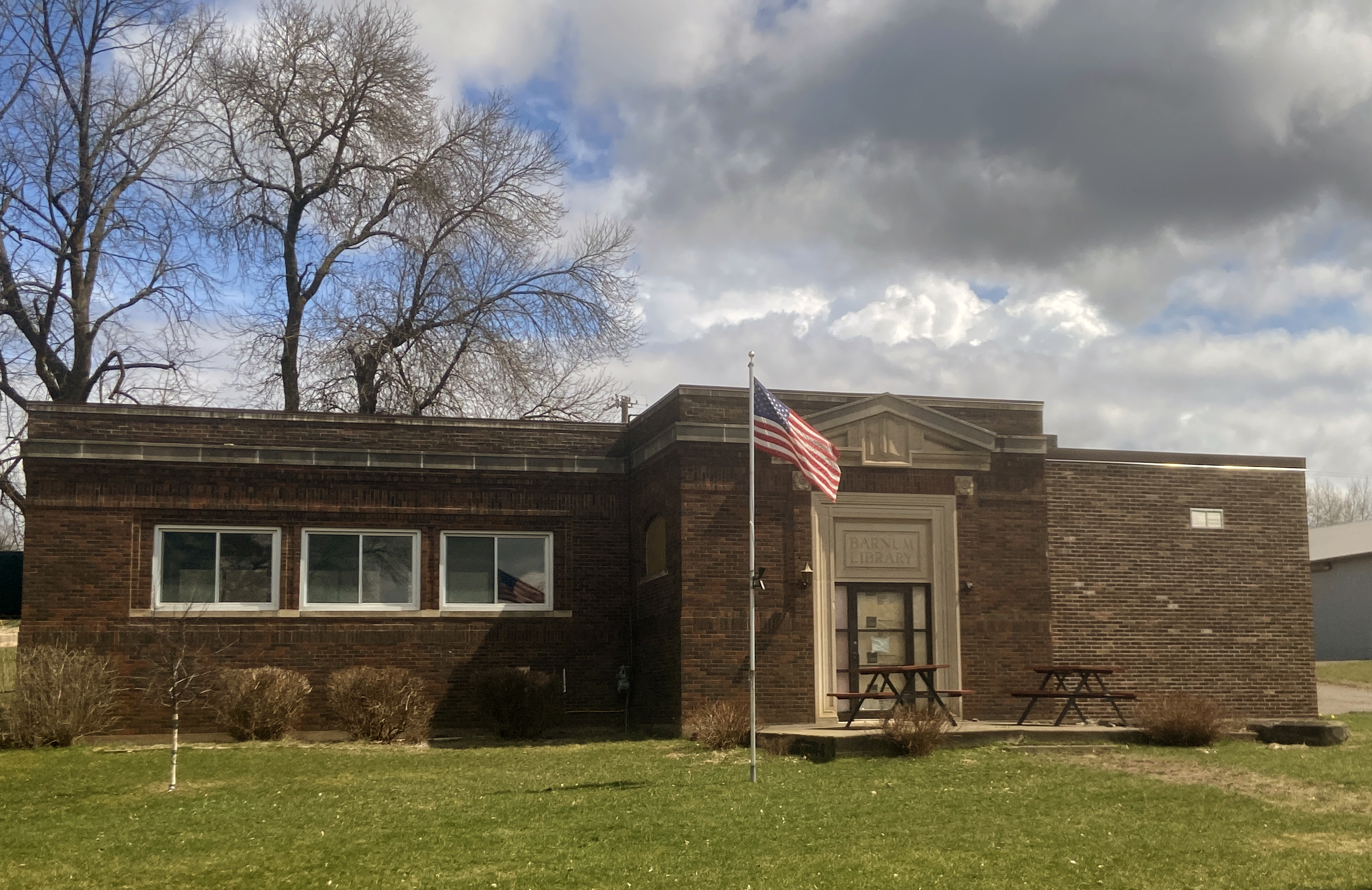
Library

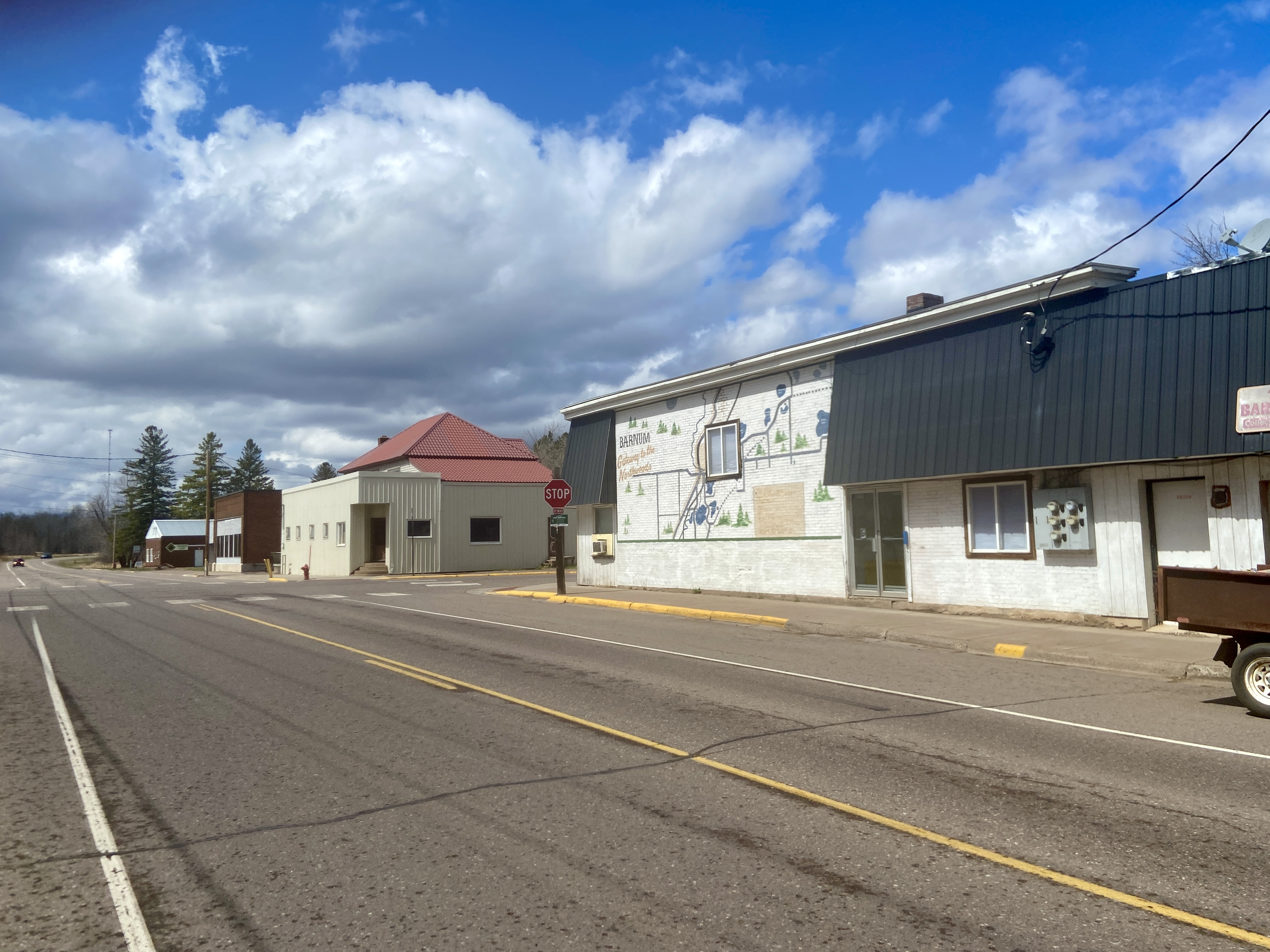
Main Street

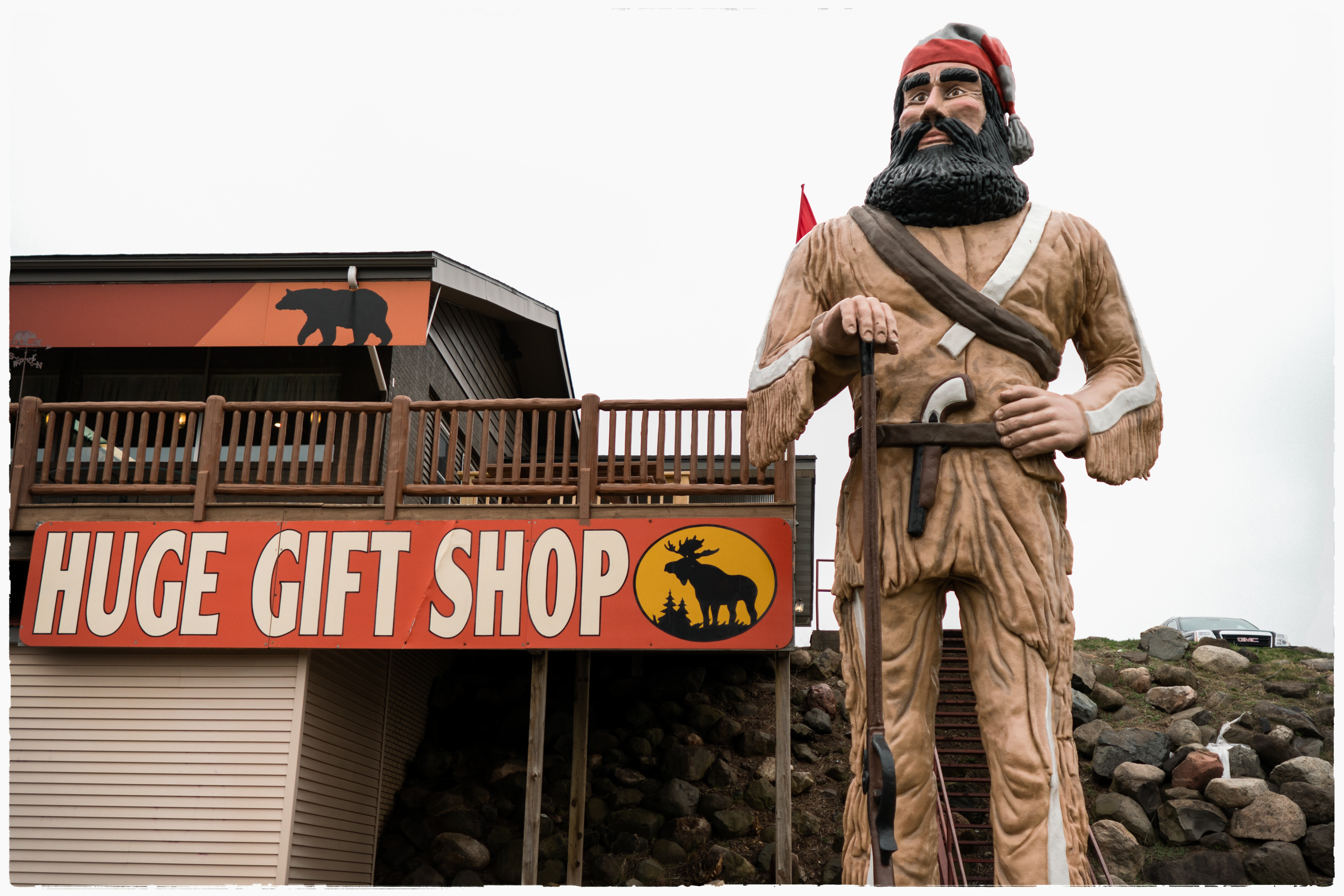
Big Louis
