= Prairie Lake Township, St. Louis County, Minnesota =

Prairie Lake Township, Minnesota
- Township
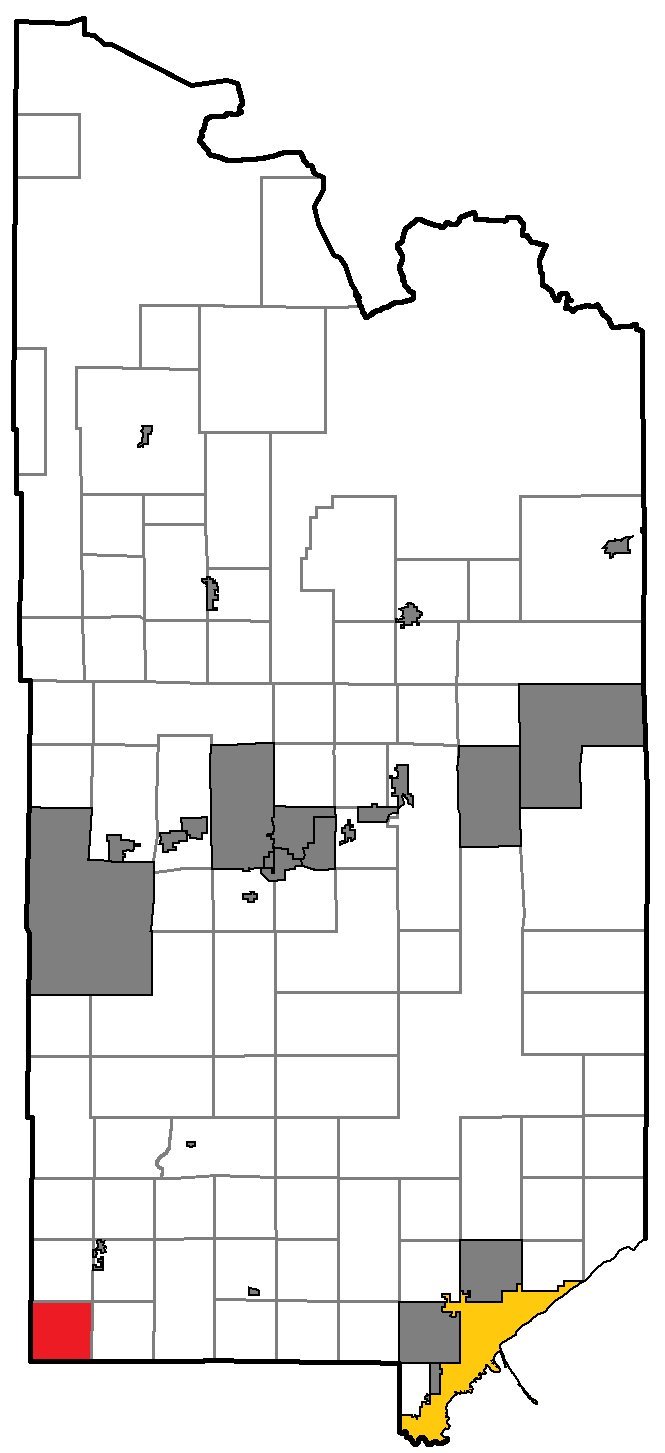
- Location of Prairie Lake Township within St. Louis County, Minnesota
- Coordinates: 46°47′39″N 92°58′34″W
- Country: United States
- State: Minnesota
- County: Saint Louis

Area
  - Total: 35.7 sq mi (92.4 km^{2})
  - Land: 35.4 sq mi (91.7 km^{2})
  - Water: 0.31 sq mi (0.8 km^{2})
- Elevation: 1,260 ft (384 m)

Population (2020)
  - Total: 45
  - Density: 1.3/sq mi (0.49/km^{2})
- Time zone: UTC-6 (Central (CST))
  - Summer (DST): UTC-5 (CDT)
- FIPS code: 27-52306
- GNIS feature ID: 0665349

Prairie Lake Township is a township in Saint Louis County, Minnesota, United States. The population was 45 at the 2020 census.

Balsam Road, Moen Road, and Graff Road pass through the township.

== Geography ==
According to the United States Census Bureau, the township has a total area of 35.7 square miles (92 km^{2}); 35.4 square miles (92 km^{2}) is land and 0.3 square miles (0.78 km^{2}), or 0.81%, is water.

Prairie Lake Township is located in the southwest part of Saint Louis County. State Highway 73 (MN 73) is nearby.

The Prairie River flows through the township.

The northern and west–central portions of Prairie Lake Township are located within the Savanna State Forest.

=== Adjacent townships, cities, and communities ===
The following are adjacent to Prairie Lake Township :

- Halden Township (north)
- Floodwood Township (northeast)
- The city of Floodwood (northeast)
- Fine Lakes Township (east)
- North Carlton Unorganized Territory of Carlton County (southeast)
- The city of Cromwell of Carlton County (southeast)
- Beseman Township of Carlton County (south)
- The city of Wright of Carlton County (south)
- Haugen Township of Aitkin County (southwest)
- Balsam Township of Aitkin County (west)
- Savanna Portage State Park (west)
- Northeast Aitkin Unorganized Territory of Aitkin County (northwest)

== Demographics ==
At the 2000 census there were 51 people, 20 households, and 15 families living in the township. The population density was 1.4 people per square mile (0.6/km^{2}). There were 46 housing units at an average density of 1.3/sq mi (0.5/km^{2}). The racial makeup of the township was 100.00% White. Of the 20 households 35.0% had children under the age of 18 living with them, 55.0% were married couples living together, 15.0% had a female householder with no husband present, and 25.0% were non-families. 25.0% of households were one person and 5.0% were one person aged 65 or older. The average household size was 2.55 and the average family size was 3.00.

The age distribution was 33.3% under the age of 18, 21.6% from 25 to 44, 21.6% from 45 to 64, and 23.5% 65 or older. The median age was 42 years. For every 100 females, there were 104.0 males. For every 100 females age 18 and over, there were 88.9 males.

The median household income was $36,250 and the median family income was $31,875. Males had a median income of $35,000 versus $0 for females. The per capita income for the township was $8,914. There were 31.3% of families and 32.9% of the population living below the poverty line, including 46.3% of under eighteens and none of those over 64.
