= Fine Lakes Township, St. Louis County, Minnesota =

Fine Lakes Township, Minnesota
- Township
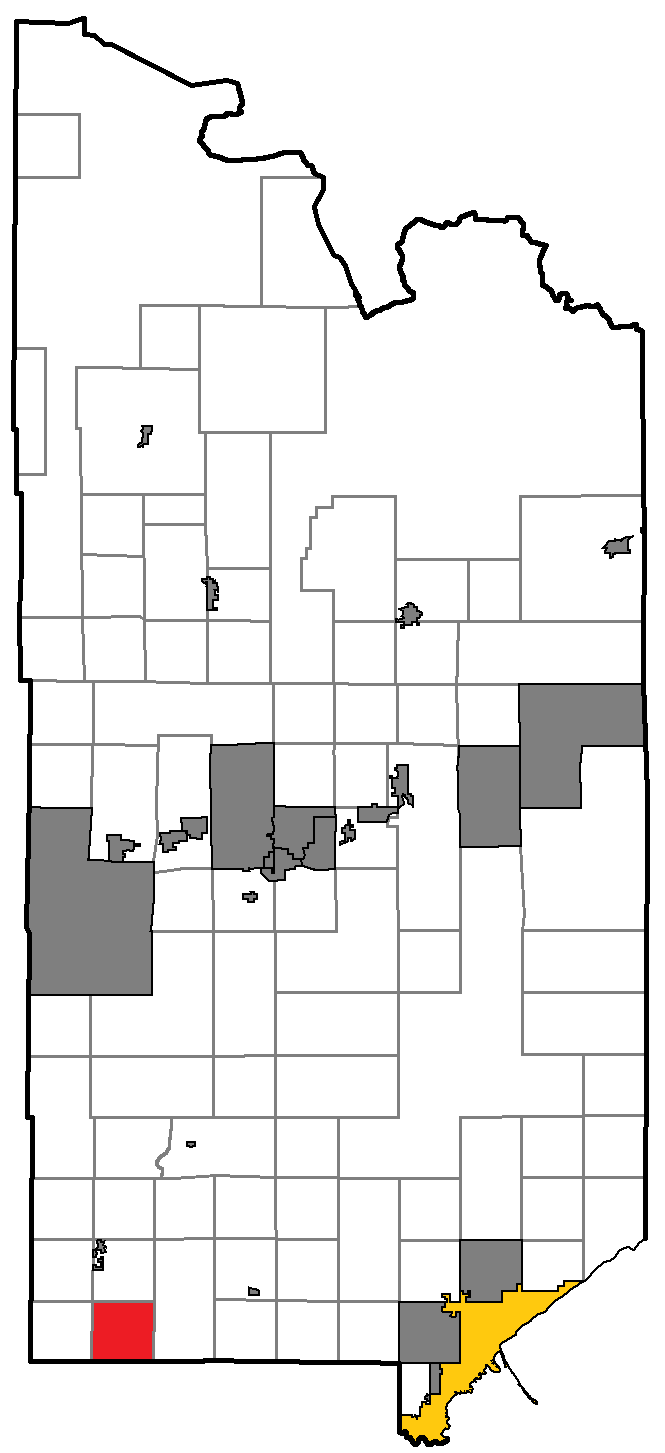
- Location of Fine Lakes Township within St. Louis County, Minnesota
- Coordinates: 46°47′40″N 92°53′23″W
- Country: United States
- State: Minnesota
- County: Saint Louis

Area
  - Total: 35.9 sq mi (93.0 km^{2})
  - Land: 34.1 sq mi (88.3 km^{2})
  - Water: 1.8 sq mi (4.6 km^{2})
- Elevation: 1,309 ft (399 m)

Population (2020)
  - Total: 114
  - Density: 3.34/sq mi (1.29/km^{2})
- Time zone: UTC-6 (Central (CST))
  - Summer (DST): UTC-5 (CDT)
- FIPS code: 27-21086
- GNIS feature ID: 0664167

Fine Lakes Township is a township in Saint Louis County, Minnesota, United States. The population was 114 at the 2020 census.

State Highway 73 (MN 73) serves as a main route in the township. Other routes include Prairie Lake Road and Hingeley Road.

The town was named after its "numerous little lakes" by its settlers.

== Geography ==
According to the United States Census Bureau, the township has a total area of 35.9 square miles (93 km^{2}); 34.1 square miles (88 km^{2}) is land and 1.8 square miles (4.7 km^{2}), or 4.99%, is water.

Fine Lakes Township is located in the southwest part of Saint Louis County.

The Ahmik River, Mirbat Creek, and Hasty Brook all flow through Fine Lakes Township.

The Prairie River briefly enters the southwest part of the township and flows into Prairie Lake.

The southeast corner of Fine Lakes Township is located within the Fond du Lac State Forest.

=== Adjacent townships, cities, and communities ===
The following are adjacent to Fine Lakes Township :

- Prairie Lake Township (west)
- Halden Township (northwest)
- Floodwood Township (north)
- The city of Floodwood (north)
- Arrowhead Township (northeast and east)
- North Carlton Unorganized Territory of Carlton County (south)
- The city of Cromwell of Carlton County (south)
- Beseman Township of Carlton County (southwest)
- The city of Wright of Carlton County (southwest)

Rogers Road runs east–west along Fine Lakes Township's northern boundary line with adjacent Floodwood Township. Clark Road also serves briefly as the boundary line between Fine Lakes and Floodwood Townships in the northwest corner of Fine Lakes Township.

== Demographics ==
At the 2000 census there were 145 people, 57 households, and 45 families living in the township. The population density was 4.3 people per square mile (1.6/km^{2}). There were 215 housing units at an average density of 6.3/sq mi (2.4/km^{2}). The racial makeup of the township was 98.62% White and 1.38% Native American. Of the 57 households 26.3% had children under the age of 18 living with them, 73.7% were married couples living together, 5.3% had a female householder with no husband present, and 19.3% were non-families. 15.8% of households were one person and 7.0% were one person aged 65 or older. The average household size was 2.54 and the average family size was 2.87.

The age distribution was 21.4% under the age of 18, 3.4% from 18 to 24, 28.3% from 25 to 44, 30.3% from 45 to 64, and 16.6% 65 or older. The median age was 42 years. For every 100 females, there were 104.2 males. For every 100 females age 18 and over, there were 107.3 males.

The median household income was $38,750 and the median family income was $40,625. Males had a median income of $26,875 versus $16,000 for females. The per capita income for the township was $16,015. There were 5.1% of families and 8.7% of the population living below the poverty line, including 18.2% of under eighteens and none of those over 64.
