= Perch Lake Township, Carlton County, Minnesota =

Perch Lake Township, Minnesota
- Township
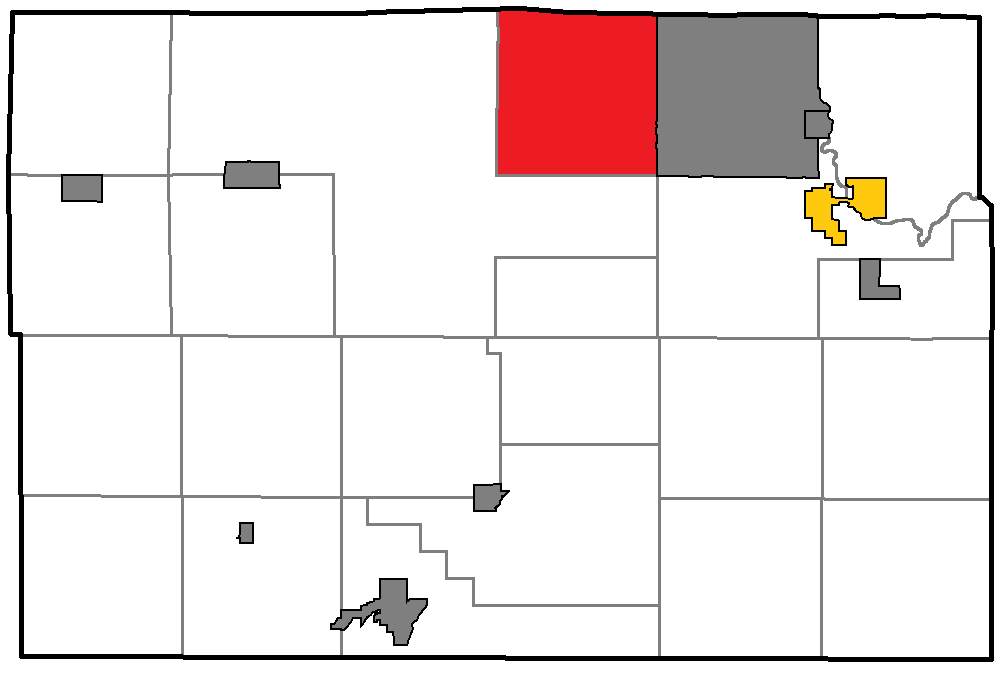
- Location of Perch Lake Township within Carlton County, Minnesota
- Coordinates: 46°42′41″N 92°37′23″W
- Country: United States
- State: Minnesota
- County: Carlton

Area
  - Total: 36.6 sq mi (94.7 km^{2})
  - Land: 34.6 sq mi (89.7 km^{2})
  - Water: 1.9 sq mi (4.9 km^{2})
- Elevation: 1,300 ft (400 m)

Population (2020)
  - Total: 977
  - Density: 28.2/sq mi (10.9/km^{2})
- Time zone: UTC-6 (Central (CST))
  - Summer (DST): UTC-5 (CDT)
- FIPS code: 27-50446
- GNIS feature ID: 0665282
- Website: https://www.perchlaketownship.org/

Perch Lake Township is a township in Carlton County, Minnesota, United States. The population was 977 as of the 2020 census. "Perch Lake" is probably an English translation of the Native American name for this township's namesake lake.

Big Lake Road, Twin Lakes Drive, Ditchbank Road, Mission Road, and Cary Road are five of the main routes in the township. Perch Lake Township is located immediately west of the city of Cloquet. The community of Sawyer is located immediately south of the township.

Perch Lake Township is located within the Fond du Lac Indian Reservation.

== Geography ==
According to the United States Census Bureau, the township has a total area of 36.5 square miles (94.7 km^{2}), of which 34.7 square miles (89.7 km^{2}) is land and 1.9 square miles (4.9 km^{2}) (5.20%) is water.

=== Unincorporated communities ===
- Big Lake

=== Lakes ===
- Big Lake
- Cedar Lake
- Hardwood Lake
- Perch Lake (east three-quarters)
- Sofie Lake

=== Adjacent townships, cities, and communities ===
The following municipalities and communities are adjacent to Perch Lake Township :

- The city of Cloquet (east)
- Twin Lakes Township (southeast)
- The unincorporated community of Sawyer (south)
- North Carlton Unorganized Territory of Carlton County (south, southwest, and west)
- Arrowhead Township, St. Louis County (northwest)
- Stoney Brook Township, St. Louis County (north)
- The unincorporated community of Mahnomen (northeast)
- Brevator Township, St. Louis County (northeast)

Atkinson Township is nearby to the south, but does not border Perch Lake Township.

=== Cemeteries ===
The township contains the following cemeteries: Big Lake Indian Catholic, Perch Lake and Methodist Indian.

== Demographics ==
As of the census of 2000, there were 998 people, 385 households, and 277 families residing in the township. The population density was 28.8 inhabitants per square mile (11.1/km^{2}). There were 506 housing units at an average density of 14.6/sq mi (5.6/km^{2}). The racial makeup of the township was 75.05% White, 22.14% Native American, 0.10% Asian, 0.20% from other races, and 2.51% from two or more races. Hispanic or Latino of any race were 1.10% of the population.

There were 385 households, out of which 34.3% had children under the age of 18 living with them, 56.1% were married couples living together, 8.3% had a female householder with no husband present, and 27.8% were non-families. 24.2% of all households were made up of individuals, and 9.1% had someone living alone who was 65 years of age or older. The average household size was 2.59 and the average family size was 3.05.

In the township the population was spread out, with 28.2% under the age of 18, 7.7% from 18 to 24, 27.2% from 25 to 44, 24.5% from 45 to 64, and 12.4% who were 65 years of age or older. The median age was 37 years. For every 100 females, there were 114.6 males. For every 100 females age 18 and over, there were 109.0 males.

The median income for a household in the township was $34,028, and the median income for a family was $44,028. Males had a median income of $35,500 versus $27,708 for females. The per capita income for the township was $16,794. About 6.3% of families and 9.8% of the population were below the poverty line, including 5.6% of those under age 18 and 9.5% of those age 65 or over.
