= Arrowhead Township, St. Louis County, Minnesota =

Arrowhead Township, Minnesota
- Township
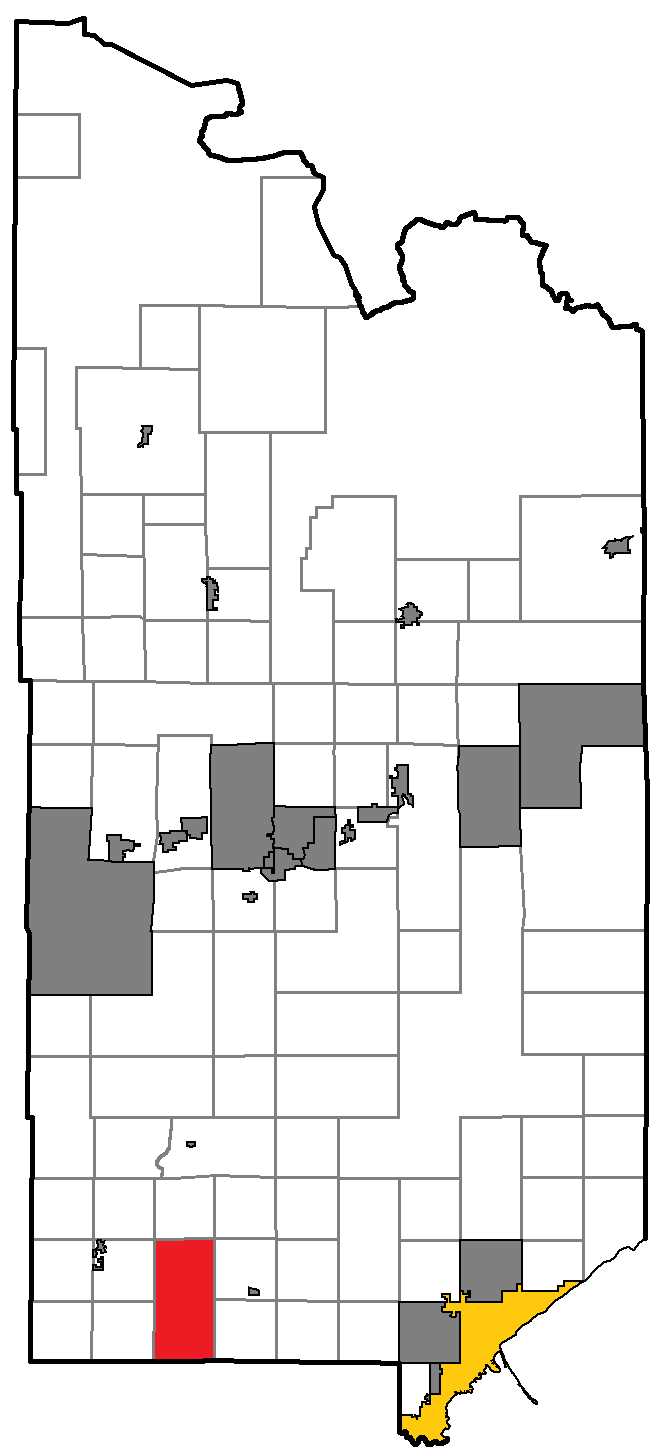
- Location of Arrowhead Township within St. Louis County, Minnesota
- Coordinates: 46°51′39″N 92°44′31″W
- Country: United States
- State: Minnesota
- County: Saint Louis

Area
  - Total: 71.7 sq mi (185.6 km^{2})
  - Land: 70.8 sq mi (183.5 km^{2})
  - Water: 0.81 sq mi (2.1 km^{2})
- Elevation: 1,368 ft (417 m)

Population (2020)
  - Total: 298
  - Density: 4.21/sq mi (1.62/km^{2})
- Time zone: UTC-6 (Central (CST))
  - Summer (DST): UTC-5 (CDT)
- FIPS code: 27-02278
- GNIS feature ID: 0663460

Arrowhead Township is a township in St. Louis County, Minnesota, United States. The population was 298 at the 2020 census.

U.S. Highway 2 serves as a main route in the township. Highway 2 runs east–west through the middle of the township.

Saint Louis County Road 8 (CR 8) runs east–west through the northern portion of the township.

The east–central and southeast portions of Arrowhead Township are located within the Fond du Lac Indian Reservation.

== Geography ==
According to the United States Census Bureau, the township has a total area of 71.7 square miles (186 km^{2}); 70.8 square miles (183 km^{2}) is land and 0.8 square miles (2.1 km^{2}), or 1.14%, is water.

The Saint Louis River runs east–west through the middle of Arrowhead Township.

=== Adjacent townships, cities, and communities ===
The following municipalities and communities are adjacent to Arrowhead Township :

- Culver Township (east)
- The city of Brookston (east)
- Stoney Brook Township (east)
- Perch Lake Township of Carlton County (southeast)
- North Carlton Unorganized Territory of Carlton County (south)
- Fine Lakes Township (west)
- The unincorporated community of Gowan (west)
- Floodwood Township (west)
- The city of Floodwood (northwest)
- Van Buren Township (northwest)
- Ness Township (north)
- Alborn Township (northeast)

== Demographics ==
As of the census of 2000, there were 232 people, 66 households, and 46 families living in the township. The population density was 3.3 inhabitants per square mile (1.3/km^{2}). There were 98 housing units at an average density of 1.4 per square mile (0.54/km^{2}). The racial makeup of the township was 94.83% White, 0.43% African American, 2.16% Native American, 0.43% from other races, and 2.16% from two or more races. Hispanic or Latino of any race were 1.29% of the population.

There were 66 households, out of which 36.4% had children under the age of 18 living with them, 59.1% were married couples living together, 4.5% had a female householder with no husband present, and 28.8% were non-families. 22.7% of all households were made up of individuals, and 13.6% had someone living alone who was 65 years of age or older. The average household size was 2.97 and the average family size was 3.23.

In the township the population was spread out, with 26.3% under the age of 18, 4.3% from 18 to 24, 27.6% from 25 to 44, 22.8% from 45 to 64, and 19.0% who were 65 years of age or older. The median age was 40 years. For every 100 females, there were 134.3 males. For every 100 females age 18 and over, there were 147.8 males.

The median income for a household in the township was $31,071, and the median income for a family was $31,607. Males had a median income of $23,750 versus $32,813 for females. The per capita income for the township was $12,055. About 23.6% of families and 27.9% of the population were below the poverty line, including 18.3% of those under the age of eighteen and 46.4% of those 65 or over.
