= Beseman Township, Carlton County, Minnesota =

Beseman Township, Minnesota
- Township
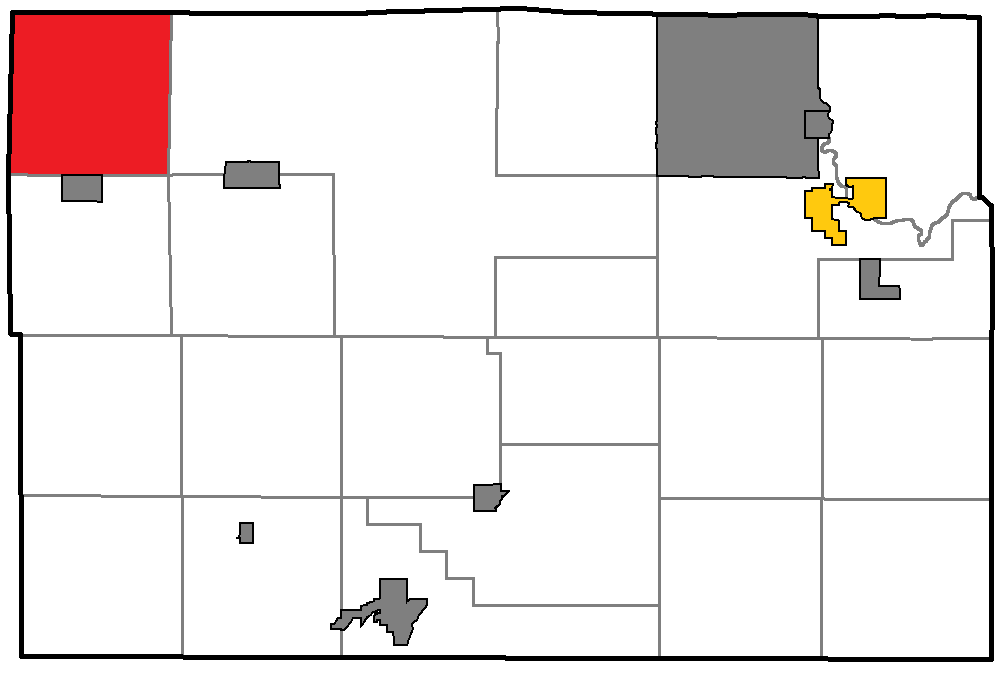
- Location of Beseman Township within Carlton County, Minnesota
- Coordinates: 46°42′32″N 93°1′29″W
- Country: United States
- State: Minnesota
- County: Carlton

Area
  - Total: 36.0 sq mi (93.3 km^{2})
  - Land: 36.0 sq mi (93.2 km^{2})
  - Water: 0.039 sq mi (0.1 km^{2})
- Elevation: 1,299 ft (396 m)

Population (2020)
  - Total: 138
  - Density: 3.83/sq mi (1.48/km^{2})
- Time zone: UTC-6 (Central (CST))
  - Summer (DST): UTC-5 (CDT)
- FIPS code: 27-05518
- GNIS feature ID: 0663579

Beseman Township is a township in Carlton County, Minnesota, United States; located near Wright and Cromwell. The population was 138 as of the 2020 census. Beseman Township was named for Ernst Besemann, a local landowner.

== Geography ==
According to the United States Census Bureau, the township has a total area of 36.0 square miles (93 km^{2}), of which 36.0 square miles (93 km^{2}) is land and 0.04 square miles (0.10 km^{2}) (0.08%) is water.

=== Adjacent townships ===
- Prairie Lake Township, St. Louis County (north)
- Fine Lakes Township, St. Louis County (northeast)
- Eagle Township (southeast)
- Lakeview Township (south)
- Clark Township, Aitkin County (southwest)
- Haugen Township, Aitkin County (west)
- Balsam Township, Aitkin County (northwest)

== Demographics ==
As of the census of 2000, there were 149 people, 54 households, and 40 families residing in the township. The population density was 4.1 inhabitants per square mile (1.6/km^{2}). There were 81 housing units at an average density of 2.3 per square mile (0.89/km^{2}). The racial makeup of the township was 93.29% White, 2.68% from other races, and 4.03% from two or more races. Hispanic or Latino of any race were 2.68% of the population.

There were 54 households, out of which 44.4% had children under the age of 18 living with them, 59.3% were married couples living together, 3.7% had a female householder with no husband present, and 24.1% were non-families. 22.2% of all households were made up of individuals, and 11.1% had someone living alone who was 65 years of age or older. The average household size was 2.76 and the average family size was 3.12.

In the township the population was spread out, with 33.6% under the age of 18, 3.4% from 18 to 24, 27.5% from 25 to 44, 24.8% from 45 to 64, and 10.7% who were 65 years of age or older. The median age was 36 years. For every 100 females, there were 136.5 males. For every 100 females age 18 and over, there were 135.7 males.

The median income for a household in the township was $39,583, and the median income for a family was $41,750. Males had a median income of $27,143 versus $19,583 for females. The per capita income for the township was $14,767. There were 19.1% of families and 19.1% of the population living below the poverty line, including 27.9% of under eighteens and none of those over 64.
