= Jim Northrup =

Jim Northrup may refer to:

- Jim Northrup (baseball) (1939–2011), Major League Baseball outfielder
- Jim Northrup (writer) (1943–2016), Ojibwa author and humorist
