= Lake View Township =

Lake View Township or Lakeview Township may refer to:

- Lake View Township, Cook County, Illinois, now Lake View, Chicago
- Lake View Township, Becker County, Minnesota
- Lakeview Township, Carlton County, Minnesota
- Lakeview Township, Burke County, North Dakota, in Burke County, North Dakota
- Lakeville Township, Grand Forks County, North Dakota, in Grand Forks, North Dakota
- Lake View Township, Lake County, South Dakota, in Lake County, South Dakota
