= Lakeview Township, Carlton County, Minnesota =

Township in Carlton County, Minnesota, United States

Lakeview Township, Minnesota
- Township
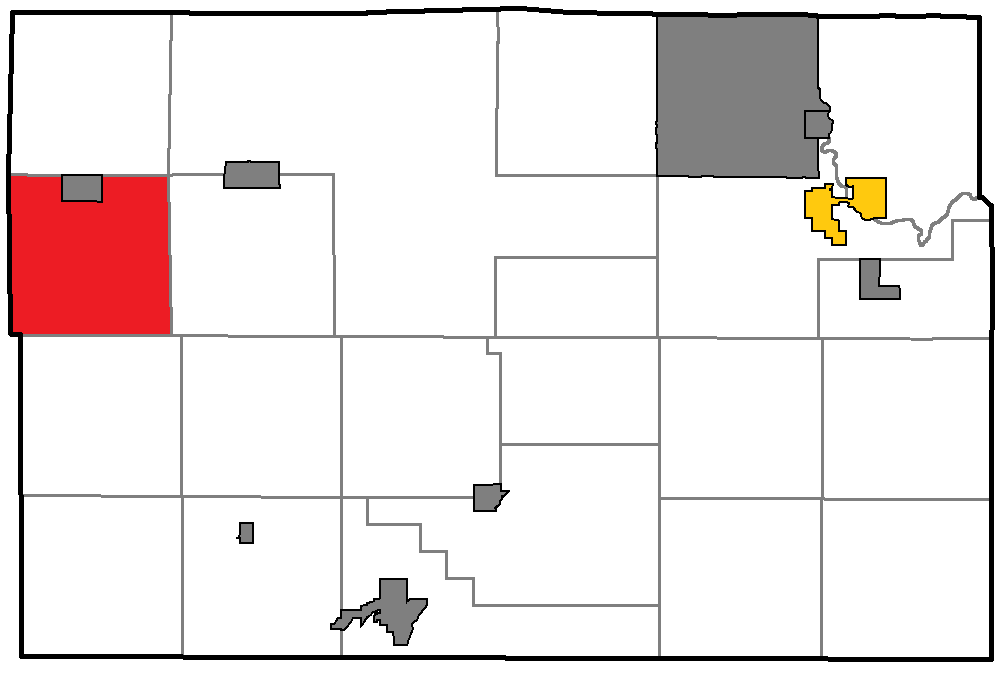
- Location of Lakeview Township within Carlton County, Minnesota
- Country: United States
- State: Minnesota
- County: Carlton

Area
  - Total: 34.44 sq mi (89.2 km^{2})
  - Land: 33.5 sq mi (87 km^{2})
  - Water: 0.94 sq mi (2.4 km^{2})

Population (2020)
  - Total: 207
  - Density: 6.18/sq mi (2.39/km^{2})
- Time zone: UTC-6 (Central (CST))
  - Summer (DST): UTC-5 (CDT)
- Area code: 218

Lakeview Township is a township in Carlton County, Minnesota, United States. The population was 207 as of the 2020 census. Lakeview Township was so named by early settlers from their scenic views over Tamarack Lake and other lakes.

== Geography ==
According to the United States Census Bureau, the township has a total area of 34.4 square miles (89 km^{2}), of which 33.4 square miles (87 km^{2}) is land and 1.0 square mile (2.6 km^{2}) (2.82%) is water.

The city of Wright is located entirely within Lakeview Township geographically but is a separate entity. The city of Cromwell is nearby.

=== Unincorporated community ===
- Woodbury at 46.679114°N 92.959931°W

(This list is based on USGS data and may include former settlements.)

=== Major highway ===
- Minnesota State Highway 210

=== Lakes ===
- Cole Lake
- Long Lake
- Mattlia Lake
- School Lake
- Section One Lake
- Tamarack Lake
- Valley Lake
- Walli Lake

=== Adjacent townships ===
- Beseman Township (north)
- Eagle Township (east)
- Automba Township (south)
- Salo Township, Aitkin County (southwest)
- Clark Township, Aitkin County (west)
- Haugen Township, Aitkin County (northwest)

=== Cemeteries ===
The township contains Lakeside Cemetery.

== Demographics ==
As of the census of 2000, there were 194 people, 84 households, and 67 families residing in the township. The population density was 5.8 people per square mile (2.2/km^{2}). There were 146 housing units at an average density of 4.4/sq mi (1.7/km^{2}). The racial makeup of the township was 98.97% White, 0.52% from other races, and 0.52% from two or more races. Hispanic or Latino of any race were 0.52% of the population. 29.2% were of Finnish, 28.0% German, 10.6% Swedish and 5.6% Welsh ancestry according to Census 2000.

There were 84 households, out of which 21.4% had children under the age of 18 living with them, 64.3% were married couples living together, 7.1% had a female householder with no husband present, and 20.2% were non-families. 19.0% of all households were made up of individuals, and 11.9% had someone living alone who was 65 years of age or older. The average household size was 2.31 and the average family size was 2.46.

In the township the population was spread out, with 18.6% under the age of 18, 10.3% from 18 to 24, 15.5% from 25 to 44, 26.3% from 45 to 64, and 29.4% who were 65 years of age or older. The median age was 50 years. For every 100 females, there were 98.0 males. For every 100 females age 18 and over, there were 97.5 males.

The median income for a household in the township was $29,545, and the median income for a family was $31,563. Males had a median income of $31,429 versus $23,333 for females. The per capita income for the township was $17,822. About 6.2% of families and 10.9% of the population were below the poverty line, including 14.6% of those under the age of eighteen and 7.0% of those 65 or over.
