= Fond du Lac Indian Reservation =

Indian reservation in northern Minnesota

Coordinates: 46°45′34″N 92°36′50″W

Fond du Lac Indian Reservation Nah-Gah-Chi-Wa-Nong (Nagaajiwanaang)
- Indian reservation
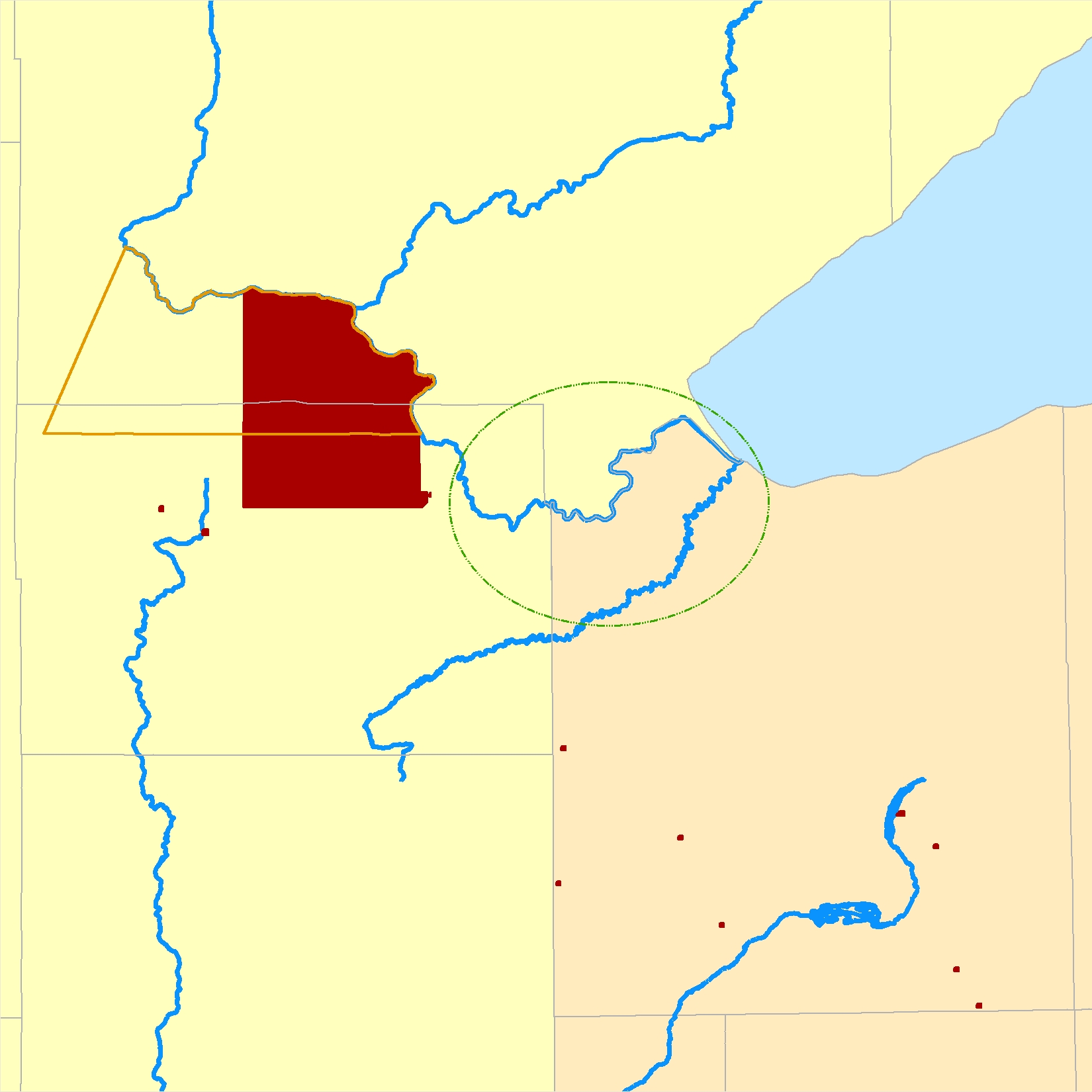
- Fond du Lac Indian Reservation. (1854–1858 reservation shown in orange outline. 1858–present reservation shown in dark red.) Original core Fond du Lac Band area closer to the mouth of the Saint Louis River before relocation to the reservation shown in green.

- Location within Minnesota

Area
  - Total: 412.8 km^{2} (159.4 sq mi)
  - Land: 400.1 km^{2} (154.5 sq mi)
  - Water: 12.7 km^{2} (4.9 sq mi)

Population (2020)
  - Total: 4,184
  - Density: 10.46/km^{2} (27.08/sq mi)
- Website: www.fdlband.org

The Fond du Lac Indian Reservation (or Nah-Gah-Chi-Wa-Nong (Nagaajiwanaang in the Double Vowel orthography), meaning "Where the current is blocked" in the Ojibwe language) is an Indian reservation in northern Minnesota near Cloquet in Carlton and Saint Louis counties. Off-reservation holdings are located across the state in Douglas County, in the northwest corner of Wisconsin. The total land area of these tribal lands is 154.49 square miles (400.1 km^{2}). It is the land-base for the Fond du Lac Band of Lake Superior Chippewa. Before the establishment of this reservation, the Fond du Lac Band of Lake Superior Chippewa were located at the head of Lake Superior, closer to the mouth of the Saint Louis River, where Duluth has developed.

Location of Fond du Lac Indian Reservation

== History ==
The tribe ceded land to the US as part of an 1837 treaty along with other Ojibwa bands; the lands were located mainly from east-central Minnesota to north-central Wisconsin. Later, as part of the Treaty of La Pointe in 1842, the Fond du Lac Band and other Ojibwa tribes ceded large tracts of land located mainly in the Lake Superior watershed in Wisconsin and the western Upper Peninsula of Michigan. As part of an 1854 treaty, the tribe and the Lake Superior Band of Chippewa (largely situated along the northern shore of Lake Superior in Minnesota) ceded more land to the US.

Under this 1854 treaty, the US established the Fond du Lac Indian Reservation farther up the Saint Louis River, at its present location. The original Nagaajiwanaang Reservation was 1.25 times the current size. In treaty discussions the US representatives were recorded as promising the inclusion of the Perch and Big lakes, but these were excluded from the original reservation. Its boundaries extended westward to the western boundaries of the 1854 Ceded Territory. Upon appeal by the tribe, the US extended the reservation boundaries southward to include the two said lakes, but as a concession, the tribe had to agree to a reduction in the western boundaries, which were placed at the current location.

On September 2 1862 a letter was sent from the Fond du Lac St. Louis Reservation to Governor Alexander Ramsey. Chief Naw-Gaw-Nub and Chief Shin-Gwack(Shin-goob) requested that the Governor relay to President Lincoln that the Fond du Lac Chippewa wanted to help with the Sioux Uprising.

The Fond du Lac Reservation was subject to allotment under the Dawes Act of 1887 and the Nelson Act of 1889, causing tribal land to be subdivided into the ownership of individual tribal members or alienated to white settlers and timber companies. Almost 3/4 of the Fond du Lac reservation had passed into non-native ownership by 1934. The band began to reacquire land after the Indian Reorganization Act of 1934 and had regained control of just over half of the land within the reservation by 1981.

== Government ==
The FDL adopted a written constitution with an elected government. Its tribal council has five members, who serve four year staggered terms.

The FDL operates social services, tribal housing, a tribal police force, a natural resource building, a gas station, three community centers, and a private health clinic and pharmacy called Min No Aya Win Health Center. The tribe also operates two satellite health clinics, one in Duluth, named The Center for American Indian Resources (CAIR), and another in Minneapolis, the Mashkiki Waakaaigan Pharmacy (Medicine House). It has numerous members who live in these urban areas.

== Geography ==
According to the U.S. Census Bureau, the combined reservation and off-reservation trust land have a total area of 159.38 square miles (412.8 km^{2}), of which 154.49 square miles (400.1 km^{2}) is land and 4.89 square miles (12.7 km^{2}) is water.

== Demographics ==
As of the census of 2020, the total population living on Fond du Lac Reservation and Off-Reservation Trust Land was 4,184. The population density was 27.1 inhabitants per square mile (10.5/km^{2}). There were 1,713 housing units at an average density of 11.1 per square mile (4.3/km^{2}).

The Fond du Lac Reservation has a significant non-native population due in part to the allotment and sale of reservation lands in the early twentieth century. The racial makeup of the reservation and off-reservation trust land in 2020 was 2,069 (49.45%) White, 1,697 (40.56%) Native American, 18 (0.43%) Black, 5 (0.12%) Asian, 4 (0.1%) from other races, and 289 (6.91%) from two or more races. Ethnically, there were 102 (2.44%) people Hispanic or Latino of any race.

== Economy ==
The tribe owns two casinos: Black Bear Casino (and golf course) in Carlton, Minnesota and Fond-du-Luth-Casino in Duluth.

The tribe also owns Northwoods Radio, FDL Gas & Grocery, FDL Propane, and FDL Sand & Gravel.

== Communities ==
- Big Lake (in Perch Lake Township)
- Brookston
- Cloquet (part)
- Mahnomen (in Brevator Township)

== Townships ==
- Arrowhead Township (part)
- Brevator Township (part)
- Brookston (city not included in any other township)
- Cloquet (part; city not included in any other township)
- Culver Township (part)
- North Carlton unorganized territory (part)
- Perch Lake Township
- Stoney Brook Township (most)
- Twin Lakes Township (part)

== Notable members ==
- Jim Northrup, columnist

== See also ==
- Church of Sts. Joseph and Mary-Catholic
- Fond du Lac Tribal and Community College
- Minnesota Indian Affairs Council
