= Sawyer, Minnesota =

Unincorporated community in Minnesota, US

Sawyer Gwaaba'iganing (Ojibwe)
- Unincorporated community
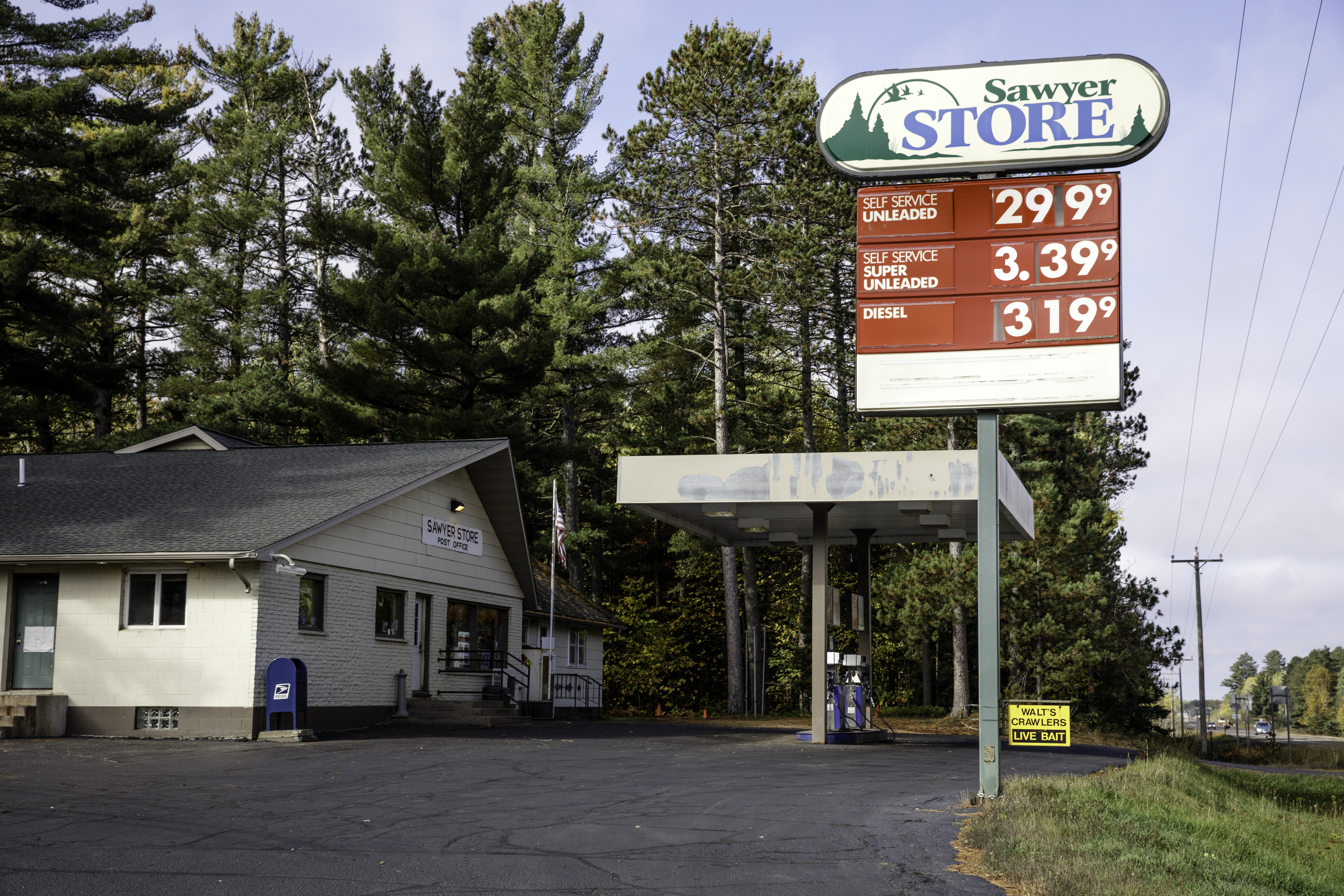
- Sawyer Store and Post Office along MN 210

- Location within Minnesota
- Coordinates: 46°40′17″N 92°38′00″W
- Country: United States
- State: Minnesota
- County: Carlton County
- Unorganized territory: North Carlton
- Elevation: 1,329 ft (405 m)
- ZIP code: 55780
- Area code: 218
- GNIS feature ID: 0651254

Sawyer (Ojibwe: Gwaaba'iganing) is an unincorporated community in Carlton County, Minnesota, United States.

The community is located between Carlton and Cromwell on State Highway 210 (MN 210). Sawyer is located on the southern edge of the Fond du Lac Indian Reservation. It serves as one of three administrative centers of the reservation.

Sawyer is located 11 miles west of Cloquet; and 11 miles east of Cromwell. The communities of Big Lake and Iverson are both nearby.

== History ==
A post office called Sawyer has been in operation since 1891. The name Sawyer was selected by a railroad official. The historic Church of Sts. Joseph and Mary was built in 1884.
