= Eagle Township, Carlton County, Minnesota =

Eagle Township, Minnesota
- Township
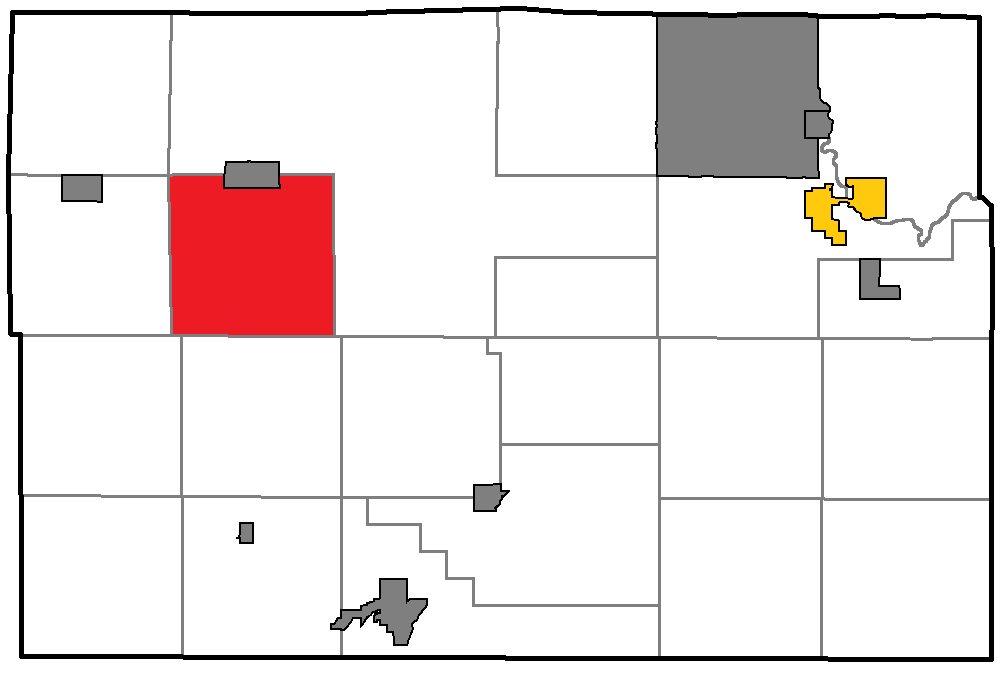
- Location of Eagle Township within Carlton County, Minnesota
- Coordinates: 46°38′50″N 92°52′58″W
- Country: United States
- State: Minnesota
- County: Carlton

Area
  - Total: 35.7 sq mi (92.5 km^{2})
  - Land: 34.6 sq mi (89.6 km^{2})
  - Water: 1.1 sq mi (2.9 km^{2})
- Elevation: 1,280 ft (390 m)

Population (2020)
  - Total: 531
  - Density: 15.3/sq mi (5.93/km^{2})
- Time zone: UTC-6 (Central (CST))
  - Summer (DST): UTC-5 (CDT)
- FIPS code: 27-17332
- GNIS feature ID: 0664015

Eagle Township is a township in Carlton County, Minnesota, United States. The population was 531 as of the 2020 census. Eagle Township took its name from Eagle Lake.

== Geography ==
According to the United States Census Bureau, the township has a total area of 35.7 square miles (92 km^{2}), of which 34.6 square miles (90 km^{2}) is land and 1.1 square miles (2.8 km^{2}) (3.11%) is water.

The south half of the city of Cromwell is located within the northern part of Eagle Township geographically but is a separate entity.

=== Major highways ===
- Minnesota State Highway 73
- Minnesota State Highway 210

=== Lakes ===
- Eagle Lake
- Island Lake (south three-quarters)
- Merwin Lake

=== Adjacent townships ===
- Kalevala Township (south)
- Automba Township (southwest)
- Lakeview Township (west)
- Beseman Township (northwest)

=== Cemetery ===
The township contains Eagle Lake Cemetery.

== Demographics ==
As of the census of 2000, there were 565 people, 232 households, and 171 families residing in the township. The population density was 16.3 inhabitants per square mile (6.3/km^{2}). There were 383 housing units at an average density of 11.1 per square mile (4.3/km^{2}). The racial makeup of the township was 97.70% White, 0.88% Native American, 0.18% Asian, 0.18% from other races, and 1.06% from two or more races. Hispanic or Latino of any race were 0.53% of the population.

There were 232 households, out of which 28.4% had children under the age of 18 living with them, 63.8% were married couples living together, 7.3% had a female householder with no husband present, and 25.9% were non-families. 23.3% of all households were made up of individuals, and 14.7% had someone living alone who was 65 years of age or older. The average household size was 2.44 and the average family size was 2.84.

In the township the population was spread out, with 22.3% under the age of 18, 6.5% from 18 to 24, 23.7% from 25 to 44, 25.1% from 45 to 64, and 22.3% who were 65 years of age or older. The median age was 44 years. For every 100 females, there were 110.8 males. For every 100 females age 18 and over, there were 106.1 males.

The median income for a household in the township was $36,071, and the median income for a family was $42,813. Males had a median income of $39,063 versus $21,875 for females. The per capita income for the township was $19,078. About 5.3% of families and 9.7% of the population were below the poverty line, including 20.0% of those under age 18 and 7.6% of those age 65 or over.
