= Church of Sts. Joseph and Mary-Catholic =

Historic church in Minnesota, United States

- U.S. National Register of Historic Places
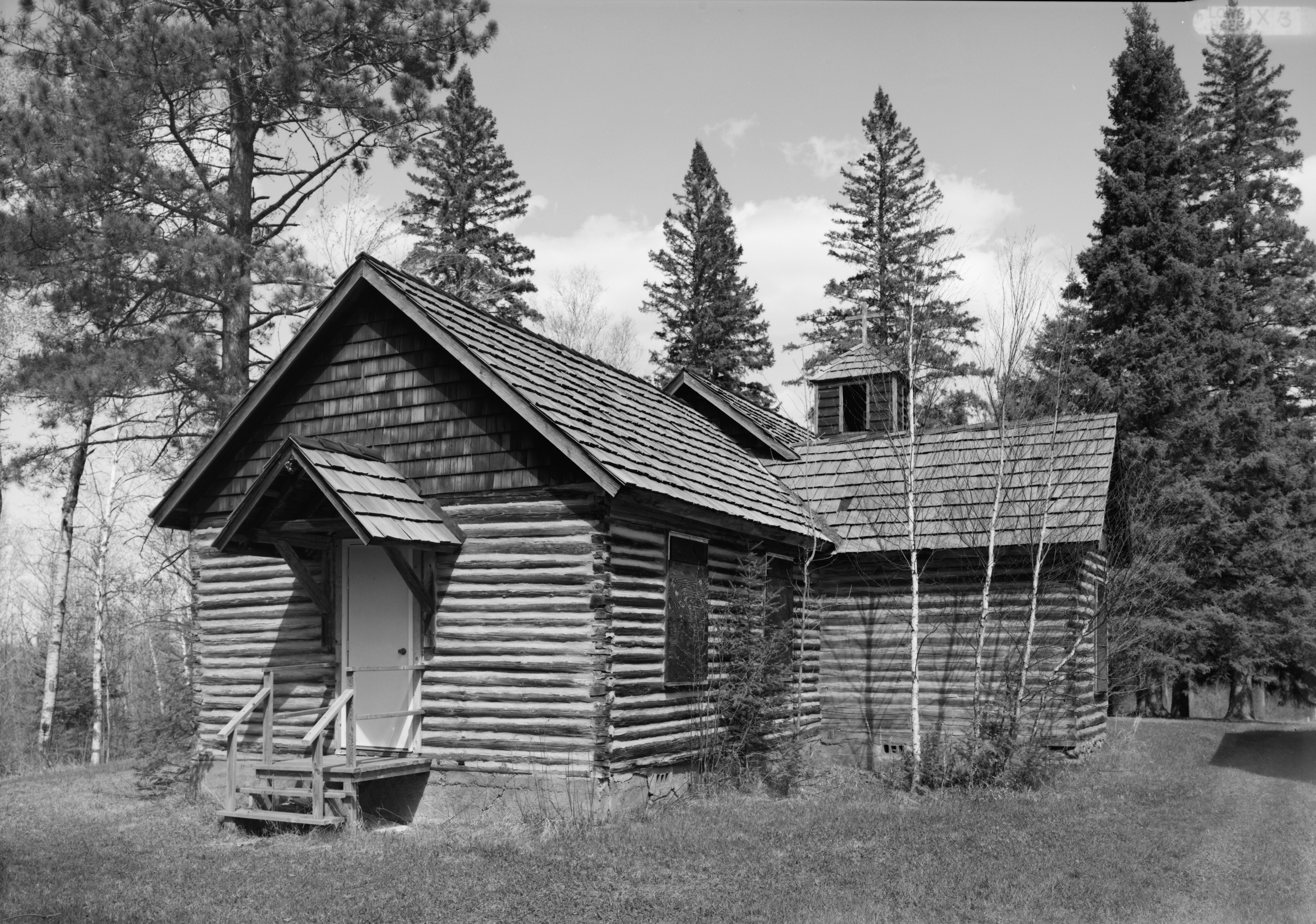
- Church of Saints Joseph and Mary in 1990

- Location within Minnesota Location within the United States
- Nearest city: Cloquet, Minnesota
- Coordinates: 46°41′2.57″N 92°38′12.28″W
- Area: Fond du Lac Indian Reservation
- Built: 1884
- Architect: Moses Posey
- Architectural style: Native American, Log
- NRHP reference No.: 84001409
- Added to NRHP: March 29, 1984

The Church of Saints Joseph and Mary or Sawyer Log Church was built in 1884 by Ojibwe parishioners in Sawyer, Minnesota, United States. It is one of the state's oldest Catholic churches built among the Ojibwe people, one of the oldest churches in northern Minnesota overall, and one of Carlton County's few historic buildings to predate the 1918 Cloquet Fire.
