= Clark Township, Aitkin County, Minnesota =

Township in Minnesota, United States

Clark Township
- Township
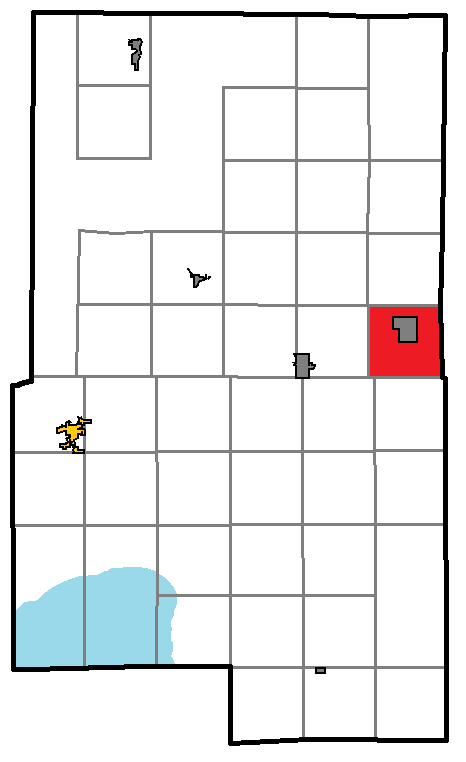
- Location of Clark Township within Aitkin County, Minnesota
- Coordinates: 46°37′29″N 93°7′57″W
- Country: United States
- State: Minnesota
- County: Aitkin

Area
  - Total: 32.2 sq mi (83.5 km^{2})
  - Land: 31.7 sq mi (82.2 km^{2})
  - Water: 0.50 sq mi (1.3 km^{2})
- Elevation: 1,263 ft (385 m)

Population (2020)
  - Total: 116
  - Density: 3.65/sq mi (1.41/km^{2})
- Time zone: UTC-6 (Central (CST))
  - Summer (DST): UTC-5 (CDT)
- ZIP code: 55787
- Area code: 218
- FIPS code: 27-11620
- GNIS feature ID: 0663807

Clark Township is a township in Aitkin County, Minnesota, United States. The population was 116 as of the 2020 census.

== History ==
Clark Township was named for Frank Clark, an early settler. It was incorporated May 27, 1902.

== Geography ==
According to the United States Census Bureau, the township has a total area of 32.2 square miles (83.5 km^{2}), of which 31.7 square miles (82.2 km^{2}) is land and 0.50 square miles (1.3 km^{2}), or 1.57%, is water.

The city of Tamarack lies within the township but is a separate entity.

=== Major highway ===
- Minnesota State Highway 210

=== Lakes ===
- Bone Lake
- Clear Lake
- Cranberry Lake
- Douglas Lake
- Kelly Lake
- Kettle Lake
- Little Lake
- Louma Lake
- Mud Lake
- Nelson Lake
- Rice Lake (vast majority)
- Spruce Lake

=== Adjacent townships ===
- Haugen Township (north)
- Beseman Township, Carlton County (northeast)
- Lakeview Township, Carlton County (east)
- Salo Township (south)
- Spalding Township (southwest)
- McGregor Township (west)
- Shamrock Township (northwest)

=== Cemeteries ===
The township contains Fairview Cemetery.

== Demographics ==
As of the census of 2000, there were 148 people, 55 households, and 37 families residing in the township. The population density was 4.7 inhabitants per square mile (1.8/km^{2}). There were 89 housing units at an average density of 2.8 per square mile (1.1/km^{2}). The racial makeup of the township was 87.16% White and 12.84% Native American.

There were 55 households, out of which 25.5% had children under the age of 18 living with them, 65.5% were married couples living together, and 32.7% were non-families. 30.9% of all households were made up of individuals, and 14.5% had someone living alone who was 65 years of age or older. The average household size was 2.69 and the average family size was 3.38.

In the township the population was spread out, with 31.1% under the age of 18, 2.7% from 18 to 24, 23.6% from 25 to 44, 27.0% from 45 to 64, and 15.5% who were 65 years of age or older. The median age was 41 years. For every 100 females, there were 114.5 males. For every 100 females age 18 and over, there were 100.0 males.

The median income for a household in the township was $26,250, and the median income for a family was $36,250. Males had a median income of $26,250 versus $21,250 for females. The per capita income for the township was $13,591. There were 17.5% of families and 23.6% of the population living below the poverty line, including 33.3% of under eighteens and 19.2% of those over 64.
