= Minnesota Indian Affairs Council =

The Minnesota Indian Affairs Council (MIAC) is an intergovernmental body established by the U.S. state of Minnesota to serve as a liaison between state government and the Native American tribes residing within the state's boundaries. Created by the Minnesota Legislature, MIAC aims to improve relationships, facilitate dialogue, and address issues of mutual concern between the State of Minnesota and the tribal governments. The council plays a critical role in advising on policy, advocating for indigenous rights, and promoting cultural understanding.

== History ==
Founded in 1963, the Minnesota Indian Affairs Council was one of the first councils of its kind in the United States. It was established at a time when the civil rights movement was gaining traction, and issues pertaining to the rights and well-being of Native Americans were becoming more prominent in political discourse. The creation of MIAC represented a formalized effort by the State of Minnesota to engage with Native American tribes in a cooperative and respectful manner.

== Functions and responsibilities ==
=== Policy advisory ===
One of MIAC's primary roles is to serve as an advisory body to the Governor, State Legislature, and other state agencies. The council provides recommendations on legislation, policies, and programs affecting Native American communities.

=== Intergovernmental relations ===
MIAC works to foster strong relationships between the tribal governments and the State of Minnesota. The council provides a forum for discussion and negotiation on matters of mutual concern, such as land use, healthcare, education, and economic development.

=== Cultural advocacy ===
The council is committed to promoting the preservation and awareness of Native American culture. It undertakes initiatives aimed at educating the public about indigenous history, traditions, and contributions to Minnesota's society.

=== Dispute resolution ===
In situations of disagreement between tribal governments and the State of Minnesota, MIAC serves as a neutral body facilitating discussions aimed at finding mutually agreeable solutions.

== Structure ==
The Minnesota Indian Affairs Council consists of representatives from each of the 11 federally recognized tribes in Minnesota. Seven are Anishinaabe (Chippewa, Ojibwe) reservations and four are Dakota (Sioux) communities. There are also appointees from other relevant state agencies.

=== Tribal nations ===
- Bois Forte Indian Reservation
- Fond du Lac Indian Reservation
- Grand Portage Indian Reservation
- Leech Lake Indian Reservation
- Lower Sioux Indian Reservation
- Mille Lacs Indian Reservation
- Prairie Island Indian Community
- Red Lake Indian Reservation
- Shakopee-Mdewakanton Indian Reservation
- Upper Sioux Indian Reservation
- White Earth Indian Reservation

The Ho-chunk Nation and the Minnesota Chippewa Tribe are absent, though the six component members of the Minnesota Chippewa Tribe have been included in MIAC.
