= Floodwood Township, St. Louis County, Minnesota =

Floodwood Township, Minnesota
- Township
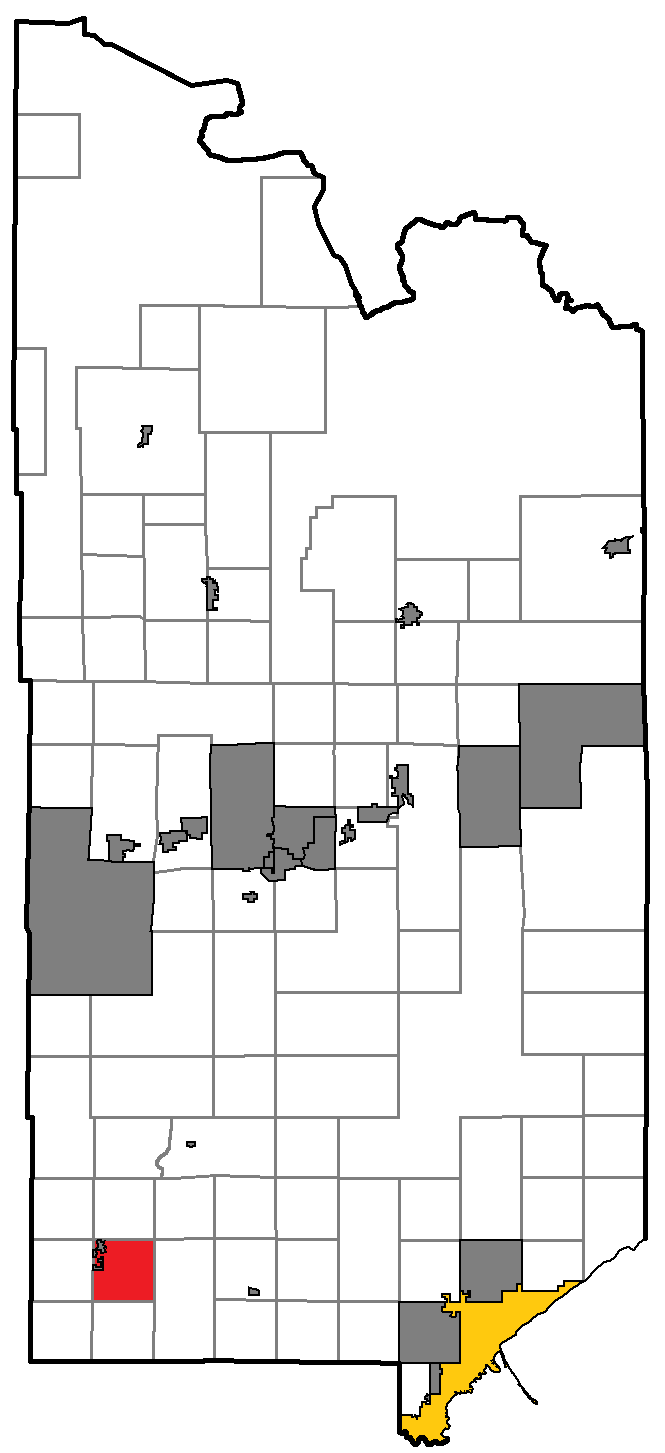
- Location of Floodwood Township within St. Louis County, Minnesota
- Coordinates: 46°53′47″N 92°53′3″W
- Country: United States
- State: Minnesota
- County: Saint Louis

Area
  - Total: 35.5 sq mi (91.9 km^{2})
  - Land: 34.8 sq mi (90.2 km^{2})
  - Water: 0.66 sq mi (1.7 km^{2})
- Elevation: 1,224 ft (373 m)

Population (2020)
  - Total: 247
  - Density: 7.09/sq mi (2.74/km^{2})
- Time zone: UTC-6 (Central (CST))
  - Summer (DST): UTC-5 (CDT)
- FIPS code: 27-21356
- GNIS feature ID: 0664178

Floodwood Township is a township in Saint Louis County, Minnesota, United States. The population was 247 at the 2020 census. The township took its name from the Floodwood River.

U.S. Highway 2 and State Highway 73 (MN 73) are two of the main routes in the township.

U.S. Highway 2 runs roughly diagonally throughout Floodwood Township, in a northwest–southeast direction. Highway 73 runs north–south through the western portion of the township. Saint Louis County Road 8 (CR 8) runs east–west through the northern portion of the township.

The unincorporated community of Gowan is located within Floodwood Township.

The city of Floodwood is located within the northwest part of Floodwood Township geographically but is a separate entity.

== Geography ==
According to the United States Census Bureau, the township has a total area of 35.5 square miles (92 km^{2}); 34.8 square miles (90 km^{2}) is land and 0.6 square miles (1.6 km^{2}), or 1.80%, is water.

The Saint Louis River flows through the township.

=== Adjacent townships, cities, and communities ===
The following are adjacent to Floodwood Township :

- The city of Floodwood (northwest)
- Van Buren Township (north)
- Ness Township (northeast)
- Arrowhead Township (east and southeast)
- Fine Lakes Township (south)
- Prairie Lake Township (southwest)
- Halden Township (west)

=== Unincorporated communities ===
- Gowan

== Demographics ==
As of the census of 2000, there were 325 people, 117 households, and 87 families residing in the township. The population density was 9.3 inhabitants per square mile (3.6/km^{2}). There were 145 housing units at an average density of 4.2 per square mile (1.6/km^{2}). The racial makeup of the township was 99.08% White. Hispanic or Latino of any race were 1.85% of the population.

There were 117 households, out of which 29.1% had children under the age of 18 living with them, 67.5% were married couples living together, 3.4% had a female householder with no husband present, and 24.8% were non-families. 22.2% of all households were made up of individuals, and 6.8% had someone living alone who was 65 years of age or older. The average household size was 2.78 and the average family size was 3.27.

In the township the population was spread out, with 29.2% under the age of 18, 6.2% from 18 to 24, 24.3% from 25 to 44, 27.4% from 45 to 64, and 12.9% who were 65 years of age or older. The median age was 40 years. For every 100 females, there were 94.6 males. For every 100 females age 18 and over, there were 101.8 males.

The median income for a household in the township was $38,906, and the median income for a family was $41,500. Males had a median income of $32,000 versus $21,250 for females. The per capita income for the township was $17,805. About 2.3% of families and 5.8% of the population were below the poverty line, including 2.8% of those under age 18 and none of those age 65 or over.
