= Haugen Township, Aitkin County, Minnesota =

Township in Minnesota, United States

Haugen Township
- Township
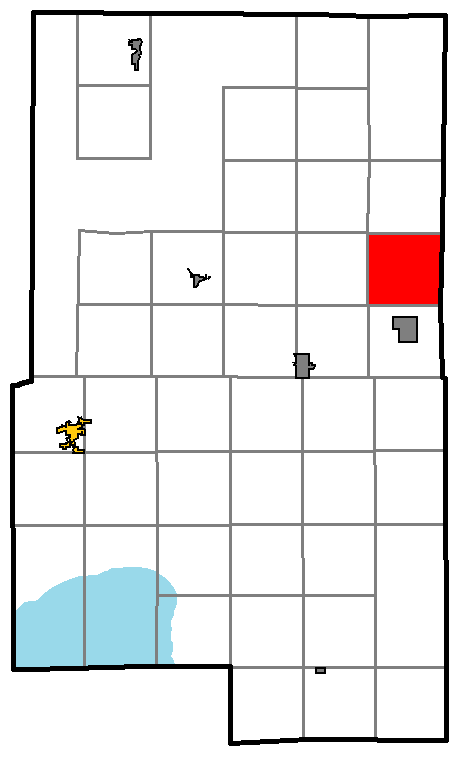
- Location of Haugen Township, within Aitkin County, Minnesota
- Coordinates: 46°43′42″N 93°8′24″W
- Country: United States
- State: Minnesota
- County: Aitkin

Area
  - Total: 36.4 sq mi (94.3 km^{2})
  - Land: 35.8 sq mi (92.7 km^{2})
  - Water: 0.62 sq mi (1.6 km^{2})
- Elevation: 1,250 ft (381 m)

Population (2020)
  - Total: 154
  - Density: 4.30/sq mi (1.66/km^{2})
- Time zone: UTC-6 (Central (CST))
  - Summer (DST): UTC-5 (CDT)
- ZIP code: 55787
- Area code: 218
- FIPS code: 27-27602
- GNIS feature ID: 0664413

Haugen Township (/ˈhaʊɡən/ HOW-gən) is a township in Aitkin County, Minnesota, United States. The population was 154 at the 2020 census.

== History ==
Haugen Township was named for county sheriff Christopher G. Haugen.

== Geography ==
According to the United States Census Bureau, Haugen Township has a total area of 36.4 square miles (94.3 km^{2}), of which 35.8 square miles (92.7 km^{2}) is land and 0.62 square miles (1.6 km^{2}), or 1.69%, is water.

=== Lakes ===
- Island Lake (east three-quarters)
- Round Lake (east half)

=== Adjacent townships ===
- Balsam Township (north)
- Prairie Lake Township, St. Louis County (northeast)
- Beseman Township, Carlton County (east)
- Lakeview Township, Carlton County (southeast)
- Clark Township (south)
- McGregor Township (southwest)
- Shamrock Township (west)
- Turner Township (northwest)

== Demographics ==
At the 2000 census, there were 163 people, 73 households and 50 families residing in the township. The population density was 4.6 per square mile (1.8/km^{2}). There were 198 housing units at an average density of 5.5/sq mi (2.1/km^{2}). The racial makeup of the township was 97.55% White, 1.84% Native American, and 0.61% from two or more races.

There were 73 households, of which 16.4% had children under the age of 18 living with them, 58.9% were married couples living together, 5.5% had a female householder with no husband present, and 31.5% were non-families. 24.7% of all households were made up of individuals, and 13.7% had someone living alone who was 65 years of age or older. The average household size was 2.23 and the average family size was 2.68.

16.6% of the population were under the age of 18, 6.7% from 18 to 24, 19.6% from 25 to 44, 29.4% from 45 to 64, and 27.6% who were 65 years of age or older. The median age was 50 years. For every 100 females, there were 111.7 males. For every 100 females age 18 and over, there were 119.4 males.

The median household income was $36,250 and the median family income was $43,750. Males had a median income of $26,250 and females $30,000. The per capita income was $20,246. About 10.4% of families and 8.2% of the population were below the poverty line, including none of those under the age of eighteen or sixty five or over.
