= Halden Township, St. Louis County, Minnesota =

Halden Township, Minnesota
- Township
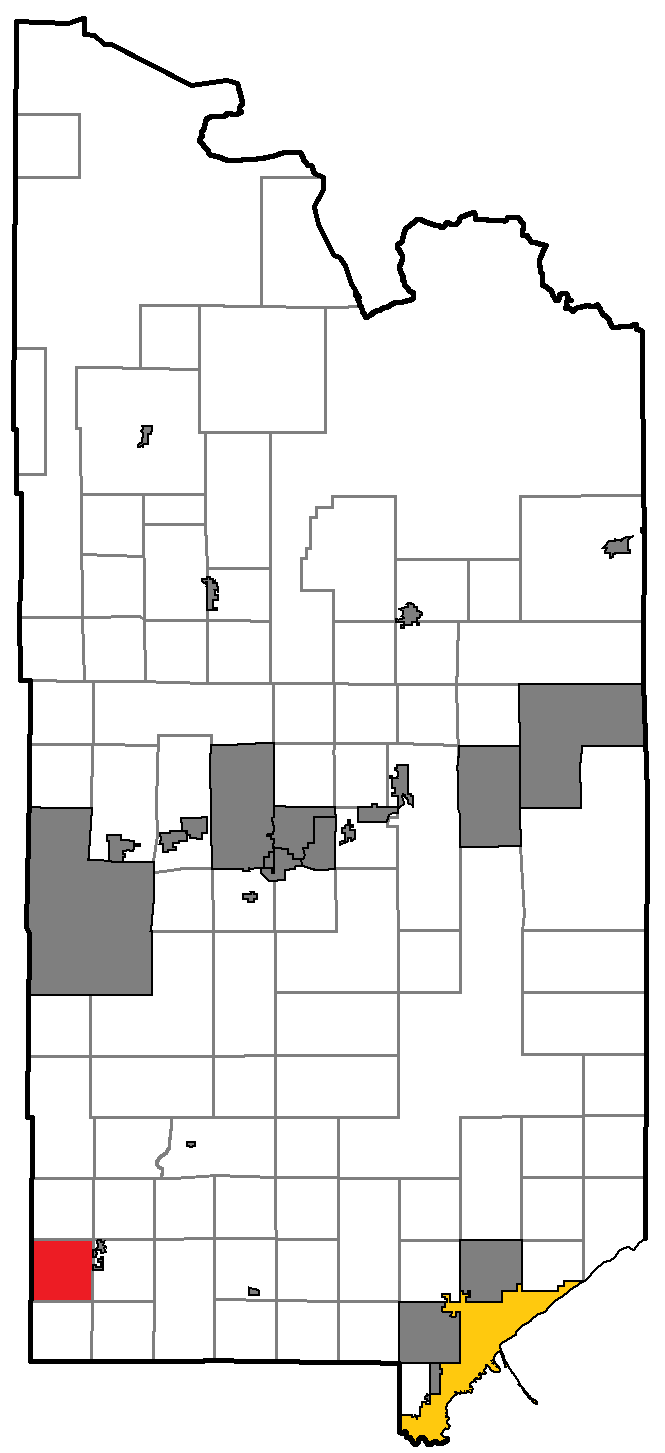
- Location of Halden Township within St. Louis County, Minnesota

- Location within the state of Minnesota Halden Township, Minnesota (the United States)
- Coordinates: 46°54′42″N 92°58′43″W
- Country: United States
- State: Minnesota
- County: Saint Louis

Area
  - Total: 35.8 sq mi (92.7 km^{2})
  - Land: 35.8 sq mi (92.7 km^{2})
  - Water: 0 sq mi (0.0 km^{2})
- Elevation: 1,257 ft (383 m)

Population (2020)
  - Total: 110
  - Density: 3.1/sq mi (1.2/km^{2})
- Time zone: UTC-6 (Central (CST))
  - Summer (DST): UTC-5 (CDT)
- FIPS code: 27-26522
- GNIS feature ID: 0664370

Halden Township is a township in Saint Louis County, Minnesota, United States. The population was 110 at the 2020 census.

Laurie Road, Floodwood Road, Evergreen Road, and Savanna Road are four of the main routes in the township. Floodwood is nearby.

== History ==
Halden Township was named for Odin Haldin, a county official.

== Geography ==
According to the United States Census Bureau, the township has a total area of 35.8 square miles (93 km^{2}), all land.

The East Savanna River flows through the township.

A small part of Savanna Portage State Park is located within the southwest corner of Halden Township. The majority of the state park is located within adjacent Aitkin County.

=== Adjacent townships, cities, and communities ===
The following are adjacent to Halden Township :

- Van Buren Township (northeast)
- The city of Floodwood (northeast)
- Floodwood Township (east)
- Fine Lakes Township (southeast)
- Prairie Lake Township (south)
- Balsam Township of Aitkin County (southwest)
- Savanna Portage State Park (southwest)
- Northeast Aitkin Unorganized Territory of Aitkin County (west)
- Potshot Lake Unorganized Territory of Saint Louis County (north)

Triplett Road runs north–south along Halden Township's eastern boundary line with both adjacent Floodwood Township and the city of Floodwood.

== Demographics ==
At the 2000 census there were 154 people, 58 households, and 41 families living in the township. The population density was 4.3 people per square mile (1.7/km^{2}). There were 74 housing units at an average density of 2.1/sq mi (0.8/km^{2}). The racial makeup of the township was 100.00% White. Of the 58 households 32.8% had children under the age of 18 living with them, 60.3% were married couples living together, 8.6% had a female householder with no husband present, and 29.3% were non-families. 24.1% of households were one person and 8.6% were one person aged 65 or older. The average household size was 2.66 and the average family size was 3.17.

The age distribution was 26.0% under the age of 18, 5.8% from 18 to 24, 27.3% from 25 to 44, 26.0% from 45 to 64, and 14.9% 65 or older. The median age was 42 years. For every 100 females, there were 111.0 males. For every 100 females age 18 and over, there were 115.1 males.

The median household income was $35,417 and the median family income was $43,750. Males had a median income of $35,250 versus $21,563 for females. The per capita income for the township was $15,844. About 13.5% of families and 13.1% of the population were below the poverty line, including 10.5% of those under the age of eighteen and none of those sixty five or over.
