= Stoney Brook Township, St. Louis County, Minnesota =

Stoney Brook Township, Minnesota
- Township
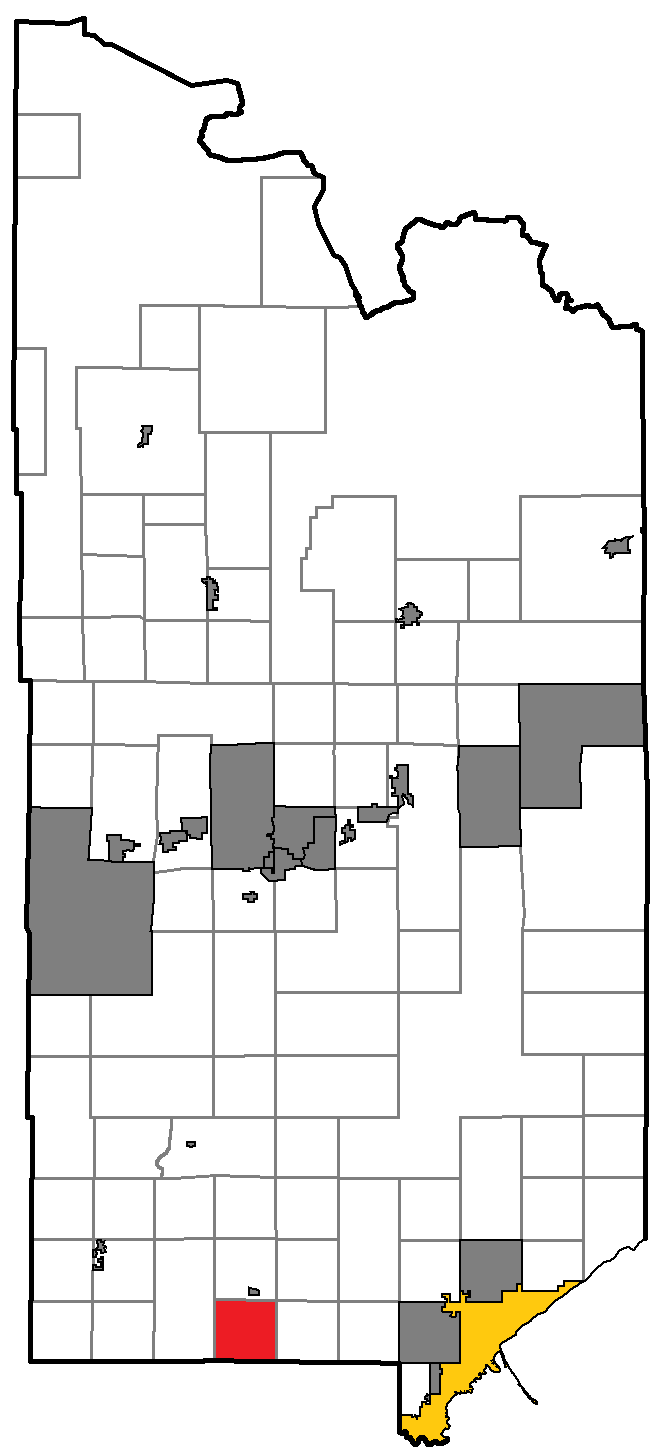
- Location of Stoney Brook Township within St. Louis County, Minnesota
- Coordinates: 46°49′29″N 92°36′47″W
- Country: United States
- State: Minnesota
- County: Saint Louis

Area
  - Total: 35.9 sq mi (92.9 km^{2})
  - Land: 35.0 sq mi (90.6 km^{2})
  - Water: 0.89 sq mi (2.3 km^{2})
- Elevation: 1,332 ft (406 m)

Population (2020)
  - Total: 323
  - Density: 9.23/sq mi (3.57/km^{2})
- Time zone: UTC-6 (Central (CST))
  - Summer (DST): UTC-5 (CDT)
- FIPS code: 27-62968
- GNIS feature ID: 0665718

Stoney Brook Township is a township in Saint Louis County, Minnesota, United States. The population was 323 at the 2020 census.

U.S. Highway 2 and Saint Louis County Road 31 (CR 31) are two of the main routes in the township.

County Road 31 runs north–south through the township. U.S. Highway 2 runs east–west along Stoney Brook Township's northern boundary line with adjacent Culver Township.

A majority of Stoney Brook Township is located within the Fond du Lac Indian Reservation.

== Geography ==
According to the United States Census Bureau, the township has a total area of 35.8 square miles (93 km^{2}); 35.0 square miles (91 km^{2}) is land and 0.9 square miles (2.3 km^{2}), or 2.43%, is water.

The Saint Louis River flows through the northeast corner of Stoney Brook Township.

=== Adjacent townships, cities, and communities ===
The following municipalities and communities are adjacent to Stoney Brook Township :

- The city of Brookston (north)
- Culver Township (north)
- Perch Lake Township of Carlton County (south)
- Brevator Township (east)
- Arrowhead Township (west)
- Industrial Township (northeast)
- The city of Cloquet (southeast)

== Demographics ==
As of the census of 2000, there were 266 people, 95 households, and 74 families residing in the township. The population density was 7.6 people per square mile (2.9/km^{2}). There were 112 housing units at an average density of 3.2/sq mi (1.2/km^{2}). The racial makeup of the township was 75.19% White, 0.75% African American, 22.93% Native American, and 1.13% from two or more races. Hispanic or Latino of any race were 0.38% of the population.

There were 95 households, out of which 34.7% had children under the age of 18 living with them, 63.2% were married couples living together, 7.4% had a female householder with no husband present, and 21.1% were non-families. 16.8% of all households were made up of individuals, and 2.1% had someone living alone who was 65 years of age or older. The average household size was 2.80 and the average family size was 3.04.

In the township the population was spread out, with 27.4% under the age of 18, 8.6% from 18 to 24, 32.7% from 25 to 44, 21.4% from 45 to 64, and 9.8% who were 65 years of age or older. The median age was 37 years. For every 100 females, there were 114.5 males. For every 100 females age 18 and over, there were 109.8 males.

The median income for a household in the township was $53,750, and the median income for a family was $54,464. Males had a median income of $42,917 versus $21,458 for females. The per capita income for the township was $19,369. About 4.7% of families and 8.9% of the population were below the poverty line, including 7.8% of those under the age of eighteen and 22.6% of those 65 or over.
