= Balsam Township, Aitkin County, Minnesota =

Township in Minnesota, United States

Balsam Township
- Township
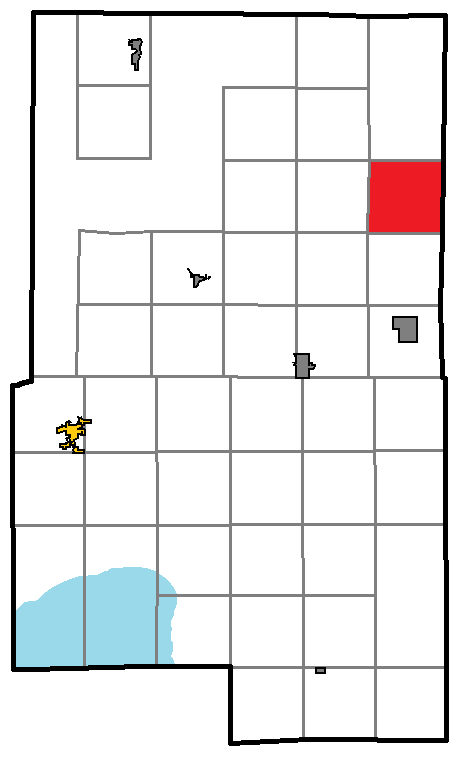
- Location of Balsam Township within Aitkin County, Minnesota

- Location within the state of Minnesota
- Coordinates: 46°47′5″N 93°8′57″W
- Country: United States
- State: Minnesota
- County: Aitkin

Area
  - Total: 36.8 sq mi (95.2 km^{2})
  - Land: 36.0 sq mi (93.3 km^{2})
  - Water: 0.73 sq mi (1.9 km^{2})
- Elevation: 1,260 ft (384 m)

Population (2020)
  - Total: 29
  - Density: 0.81/sq mi (0.31/km^{2})
- Time zone: UTC-6 (Central (CST))
  - Summer (DST): UTC-5 (CDT)
- ZIP code: 55787
- Area code: 218
- FIPS code: 27-03412
- GNIS feature ID: 0663499

Balsam Township is a township in Aitkin County, Minnesota, United States. The population was 29 as of the 2020 census. The population in 2021 is estimated to be 29.

== History ==
Balsam Township was named for two species of trees prevalent in the area, the balsam fir and balsam poplar. The Savanna Portage, a key passage from precontact Native American times into the early Euro-American settlement period, is preserved within Savanna Portage State Park and is listed on the National Register of Historic Places.

== Geography ==
According to the United States Census Bureau, the township has a total area of 36.8 square miles (95.2 km^{2}), of which 36.0 square miles (93.3 km^{2}) is land and 0.73 square miles (1.9 km^{2}), or 1.97%, is water.

=== Lakes ===
- Little Prairie Lake
- Little Savanna Lake
- Loon Lake (east quarter)
- Savanna Lake
- Shumway Lake
- Stony Lake
- Wolf Lake (vast majority)

=== Adjacent townships ===
- Halden Township, St. Louis County (northeast)
- Prairie Lake Township, St. Louis County (east)
- Beseman Township, Carlton County (southeast)
- Haugen Township (south)
- Shamrock Township (southwest)
- Turner Township (west)
- Cornish Township (northwest)

== Demographics ==
As of the census of 2000, there were 34 people, 16 households, and 11 families residing in the township. The population density was 0.9 people per square mile (0.4/km^{2}). There were 43 housing units at an average density of 1.2/sq mi (0.5/km^{2}). The racial makeup of the township was 100.00% White. Hispanic or Latino of any race were 2.94% of the population.

There were 16 households, out of which 12.5% had children under the age of 18 living with them, 68.8% were married couples living together, and 31.3% were non-families. 25.0% of all households were made up of individuals, and 6.3% had someone living alone who was 65 years of age or older. The average household size was 2.13 and the average family size was 2.36.

In the township the population was spread out, with 14.7% under the age of 18, 23.5% from 25 to 44, 41.2% from 45 to 64, and 20.6% who were 65 years of age or older. The median age was 56 years. For every 100 females, there were 78.9 males. For every 100 females age 18 and over, there were 81.3 males.

The median income for a household in the township was $18,250, and the median income for a family was $17,500. Males had a median income of $22,500 versus $18,750 for females. The per capita income for the township was $8,973. There were 12.5% of families and 13.6% of the population living below the poverty line, including no under eighteens and 33.3% of those over 64.
