= Jim Northrup (writer) =

Native American writer

- Born: April 28, 1943; Fond du Lac Indian Reservation, Minnesota, U.S.
- Died: August 1, 2016 (aged 73)
- Occupations: Columnist; author; poet; playwright
- Writing career
- Genres: Journalism, short story, poetry, storytelling
- Notable works: Walking the Rez Road; Rez Road Follies; Anishinaabe Syndicated, A View From The Rez; Shinnob Jep
- Movements: Native American writing, reportage
- Website: www.jimnorthrup.org

Jim Northrup (April 28, 1943 – August 1, 2016) was an Anishinaabe (Native American) newspaper columnist, poet, performer, and political commentator from the Fond du Lac Indian Reservation in Minnesota. His Anishinaabe name was "Chibenashi" (from Chi-bineshiinh "Big little-bird").

== Career ==
Northrup's regular column, the Fond du Lac Follies, was syndicated through several Native American papers, such as The Circle, The Native American Press and News From Indian Country. It won many awards (see below) and was known for its warm humour and sharply political undertone. Northrup often told stories through the perspective of his immediate family, most of whom, like he did, live a traditional Anishinaabe lifestyle and use a folksy style to make points about United States-Native American interactions. Fond du Lac Follies was named Best Column at the 1999 Native American Journalists Association convention. In 1990–1992, Jim worked as a roster artist for the COMPAS Writer in the Schools Program. He was a Mentor in the Loft Inroads Program, a Judge for the Lake Superior Contemporary Writers Series and The Jerome Fellowship, and a Member of the Minnesota State Arts Board Prose Panel. Jim also gave radio commentaries on the Superior Radio Network, National Public Radio, Fresh Air Radio, and the BBC-Scotland. His books Walking the Rez Road, Rez Road Follies, and Anishinaabe Syndicated are written in the same style, and have been highly praised for their insights into reservation life. He peppered his column, and the books, with jokes (e.g. Q: Why is the white man in such a hurry to get to Mars? A: He thinks we have land there) and words or phrases from his tribal language, Ojibwemowin, of which he was a student.

Born in the Government Hospital on the reservation, Northrup was brought up at Pipestone Indian School, where teachers and fellow students physically abused him. His experience such as military service in Vietnam and family tragedies, later influenced the dark humor in his writing.

Jim, with his family, lived the traditional life of the Anishinaabe in northern Minnesota, on the Fond Du Lac reservation. Year around they practice the construction of making winnowing baskets, and harvest wild rice and maple syrup. Nonetheless, his traditional lifestyle did not deter him from participating in events like the Taos Film Festival and the Taos Poetry Circus.

Jim died on August 1, 2016, due to complications from kidney cancer. He was 73.

== Quotes ==
I used to be known as a bullshitter but that didn't pay anything. I began calling myself a storyteller - a little better, more prestige - but it still didn't pay anything. I became a freelance writer. At first it was more free than lance, then I started getting money for my words (Rez Road Follies, p. 2)

== Awards ==
- Jim was named Writer of the Year in syndicated columns for 2001 by the Wordcraft Circle of Native Writer's and Storytellers for his column The Fond du Lac Follies.
- Walking the Rez Road was awarded a Minnesota Book Award and a Northeast Minnesota Book Award. Jim was honored as writer of the Best Feature Story in 1987 by the Native American Press Association for the story "Jeremiah, Jesse and Dan". In 1987, he was also named winner of the Lake Superior Contemporary Writers Series for "Culture Clash".
- The film Jim Northrup: With Reservations received an award at the Dreamspeakers Native Film Festival '97, and was named Best of Show at Red Earth '97. It was named Best Short Film at the Native American Voices Showcase 2002 at the Fargo Film Festival. It was also shown at the 1997 Native American Film & Video Festival, National Museum of the American Indian, New York City.
- The Rez Road Follies was nominated for a Minnesota Book Award, in the Creative Non-fiction category in 1995.
- Fond du Lac Follies was named Best Column at the 1999 Native American Journalists Association convention.

== Bibliography ==
=== Anthologies ===
- Nitaawichige: Selected Poetry and Prose by Four Anishinaabe Writers, with Jim Northrup, Marcie Rendon &, Linda Legarde Grover, Poetry Harbor.
- Stories Migrating Home: Anishnaabe Prose, Kimberly Blaeser (Editor), Loonfeather Press: Wisconsin
- Returning the Gift: Poetry and Prose from the First North American Native Writers' Festival, (Sun Tracks Books, No 29) University of Arizona Press.
- Touchwood: A Collection of Ojibway Prose (Many Minnesotas Project, No 3), New Rivers Press.
- North Writers: A Strong Woods Collection, John Henricksson (Editor), University of Minnesota Press.
- Stiller's Pond, New Fiction From The Upper Midwest, Jonis Agee, Roger Blakely & Susan Welch (Editors), New Rivers Press.
- Do you know me now?: an anthology of Minnesota multicultural writings, Elisabeth Rosenberg (Editor), Normandale Community College.
- Medvefelhő a város felett, Native American Poetry in Hungarian, translated by Gabor G Gyukics, Scolar Publishing, Budapest, Hungary.

=== Autobiographies ===
- Walking the Rez Road, 1993, Voyageur Press.
- Rez Road Follies: Canoes, Casinos, Computers and Birch Bark Baskets, 1997, Kodansha America, Now issued by U Of Minn Press.
- Anishinaabe Syndicated, A View From The Rez, 2011, Minnesota Historical Society Press.

=== Interviews ===
- Revisiting Vietnam, Slideshow & RealAudio
- "Walking with Jim Northrup and Sharing His "Rez"ervations", Roseanne Hoefel, in SAIL, 9, 2, 11.
- "Stories, Humor, and Survival in Jim Northrup's Walking theRez Road", Chris LaLonde, in SAIL', 9, 2, 23.
- Tribal Traditions in Minnesota, by Laine Cunningham, July 2000, American Profile magazine.
- Down Home With Jim Northrup, by Mark Rolo, 1996, Aboriginal Voices, 3, 1.
- COLORS Magazine, Language of the Land Project, Volume 1, Issue 2: March/April, 1992, David Mura and Jim Northrup on "Whose story is it, anyway?"
- Northern Lights, A Look at Minnesota Books and Writers, video #270 of the series.

=== Poetry ===
- Three more: poems, illustrations by Eva Two Crow, Minnesota Center for Book Arts and the Loft, 1992.
- Days of Obsidian, Days of Grace (with Adrian Louis, Al Hunter, and Denise Sweet), 1994,

Poetry Harbor Press

- Nagy Kis-Madár, book of poetry in Hungarian translated by Gabor G Gyukics. Új Forrás Press, Hungary, 2013.

=== Plays ===
- Rez Road 2000—performed at the Great American History Theatre in St. Paul for a five-week run in January 2000.
- Rez Road Follies
- Shinnob Jep—performed October 9, 10 & 11, 1997, at the Weisman Art Museum, University of Minnesota, as part of the Indian Humor exhibition.

== See also ==
- List of writers from peoples indigenous to the Americas
- Native American Studies
