= Gowan, Minnesota =

Gowan
- Unincorporated community
- Location within Minnesota Location within the United States
- Coordinates: 46°51′51″N 92°50′50″W
- Country: United States
- State: Minnesota
- County: Saint Louis
- Township: Floodwood Township
- Elevation: 1,263 ft (385 m)

Population
  - Total: 20
- Time zone: UTC-6 (Central (CST))
  - Summer (DST): UTC-5 (CDT)
- ZIP code: 55736
- Area code: 218
- GNIS feature ID: 661373

Gowan is an unincorporated community in Floodwood Township, Saint Louis County, Minnesota, United States.

The community is located five miles southeast of Floodwood at the intersection of U.S. Highway 2 and Saint Louis County Road 86 (Hingeley Road).

The Saint Louis River, McCarty Creek, and Mirbat Creek all flow through the community.
