= Big Lake, Carlton County, Minnesota =

Census-designated place in Minnesota, United States

Big Lake
- Census-designated place (CDP) and Unincorporated community
- Location within Minnesota
- Coordinates: 46°42′04″N 92°37′16″W
- Country: United States
- State: Minnesota
- County: Carlton County

Area
  - Total: 2.906 sq mi (7.53 km^{2})
  - Land: 2.111 sq mi (5.47 km^{2})
  - Water: 0.805 sq mi (2.08 km^{2})
- Elevation: 1,319 ft (402 m)

Population (2010)
  - Total: 443
  - Density: 210/sq mi (81.0/km^{2})
- Time zone: UTC-6 (Central (CST))
  - Summer (DST): UTC-5 (CDT)
- Area code: 218
- GNIS feature ID: 2583774

Big Lake is an unincorporated community and census-designated place (CDP) in Perch Lake Township, Carlton County, Minnesota, United States. Its population was 443 as of the 2010 census.

Carlton County Road 25 (Mission Road) and County 7 (Cary Road) are two of the main routes in the community. State Highway 210 (MN 210) and the community of Sawyer are both nearby.

Big Lake is located 10 miles west of Cloquet.

== Education ==
It is divided between the Carlton School District and the Cloquet School District.
