= Prairie River (Big Sandy Lake) =

Coordinates: 46°46′16″N 93°13′46″W

Location
- Country: United States

Physical characteristics
- Source
  - location: Minnesota

The Prairie River (Big Sandy Lake) is a river of Minnesota. The river is located in northern Minnesota, in northeast Aitkin County and southwest Saint Louis County.

Prairie River is the English translation of the native Ojibwe language name.

== See also ==
- List of rivers of Minnesota
