= Wright, Minnesota =

City in Minnesota, United States

Wright
- City
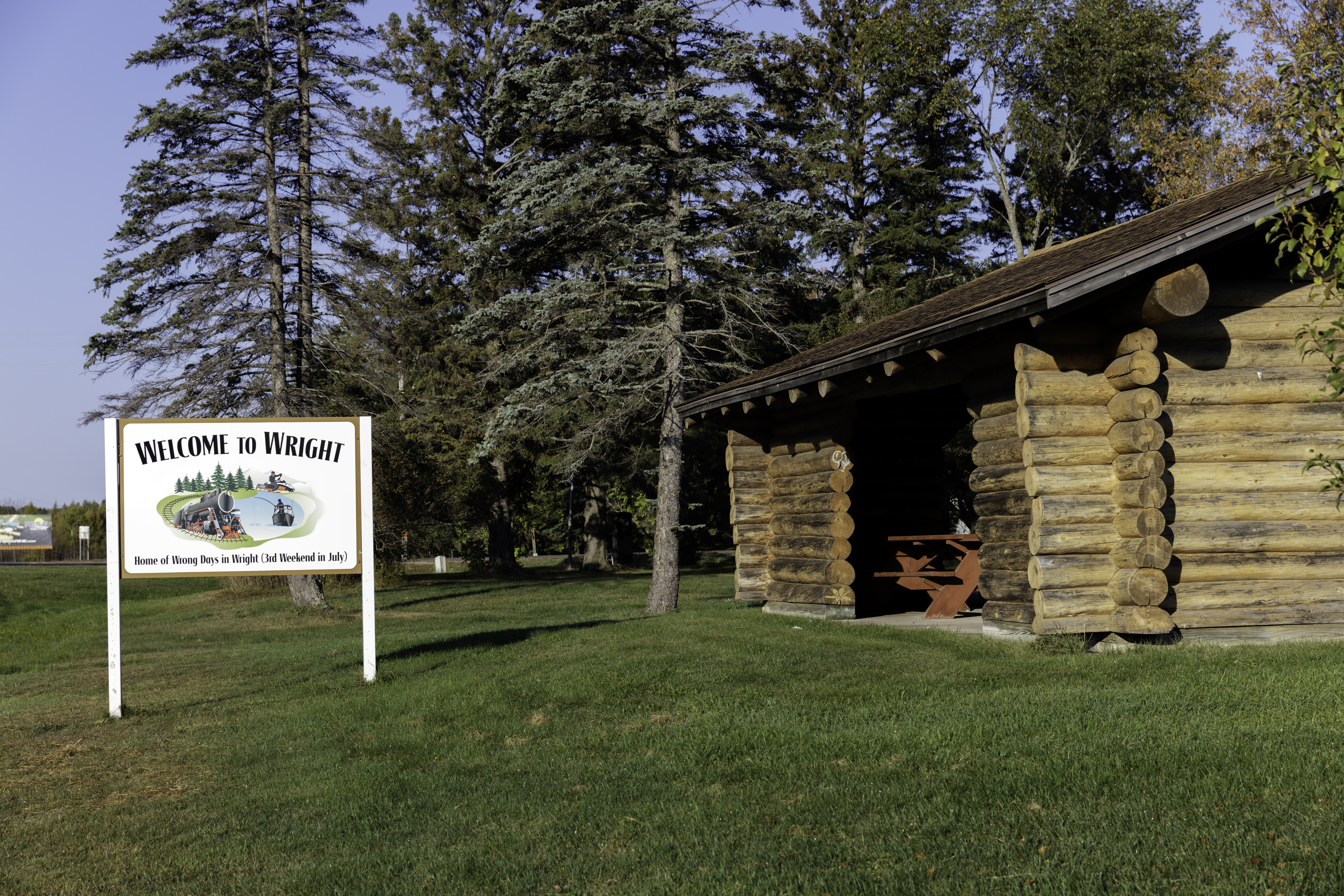
- Welcome to Wright sign

- Location of the city of Wright within Carlton County, Minnesota
- Coordinates: 46°40′19″N 93°0′25″W
- Country: United States
- State: Minnesota
- County: Carlton

Area
  - Total: 1.46 sq mi (3.79 km^{2})
  - Land: 1.46 sq mi (3.79 km^{2})
  - Water: 0 sq mi (0.00 km^{2})
- Elevation: 1,306 ft (398 m)

Population (2020)
  - Total: 168
  - Density: 114.8/sq mi (44.32/km^{2})
- Time zone: UTC-6 (Central (CST))
  - Summer (DST): UTC-5 (CDT)
- ZIP code: 55798
- Area code: 218
- FIPS code: 27-71824
- GNIS feature ID: 0654393
- Website: https://www.cityofwrightmn.gov/

Wright is a city in Carlton County, Minnesota, United States. The population was 168 at the 2020 census.

Minnesota State Highway 210 serves as a main route in Wright.

Wright is located 28 miles west of Cloquet. Wright is located 6 miles west of Cromwell; and 47 miles west-southwest of Duluth.

== History ==
A post office called Wright has been in operation since 1892. The city was named for George Burdick Wright, a land agent.

== Geography ==
According to the United States Census Bureau, the city has a total area of 1.55 square miles (4.01 km^{2}), all land.

The boundary line between Carlton and Aitkin counties is nearby. The boundary line between Carlton and Saint Louis counties is also near Wright.

=== Climate ===
Climate data for Wright 3 E, Minnesota, 1991–2020 normals, 1961-2020 extremes: 1330ft (405m)
Month	Jan	Feb	Mar	Apr	May	Jun	Jul	Aug	Sep	Oct	Nov	Dec	Year
Record high °F (°C)	54 (12)	62 (17)	76 (24)	93 (34)	94 (34)	95 (35)	100 (38)	100 (38)	97 (36)	86 (30)	72 (22)	60 (16)	100 (38)
Mean maximum °F (°C)	39.4 (4.1)	44.3 (6.8)	58.3 (14.6)	72.9 (22.7)	82.8 (28.2)	86.1 (30.1)	86.9 (30.5)	85.6 (29.8)	82.9 (28.3)	73.9 (23.3)	56.3 (13.5)	41.3 (5.2)	87.9 (31.1)
Mean daily maximum °F (°C)	18.1 (−7.7)	23.6 (−4.7)	36.1 (2.3)	50.3 (10.2)	63.6 (17.6)	71.9 (22.2)	76.4 (24.7)	74.5 (23.6)	66.4 (19.1)	52.3 (11.3)	35.7 (2.1)	22.5 (−5.3)	49.3 (9.6)
Daily mean °F (°C)	7.7 (−13.5)	12.0 (−11.1)	24.5 (−4.2)	37.9 (3.3)	50.3 (10.2)	59.3 (15.2)	64.0 (17.8)	62.4 (16.9)	54.9 (12.7)	42.1 (5.6)	27.1 (−2.7)	13.9 (−10.1)	38.0 (3.3)
Mean daily minimum °F (°C)	−2.6 (−19.2)	0.4 (−17.6)	12.9 (−10.6)	25.5 (−3.6)	36.9 (2.7)	46.6 (8.1)	51.6 (10.9)	50.4 (10.2)	43.3 (6.3)	31.9 (−0.1)	18.6 (−7.4)	5.4 (−14.8)	26.7 (−2.9)
Mean minimum °F (°C)	−28.4 (−33.6)	−23.2 (−30.7)	−13.1 (−25.1)	12.8 (−10.7)	25.9 (−3.4)	35.2 (1.8)	41.1 (5.1)	40.9 (4.9)	29.2 (−1.6)	19.7 (−6.8)	0.8 (−17.3)	−19.8 (−28.8)	−29.6 (−34.2)
Record low °F (°C)	−52 (−47)	−45 (−43)	−43 (−42)	−12 (−24)	15 (−9)	26 (−3)	33 (1)	28 (−2)	16 (−9)	1 (−17)	−28 (−33)	−47 (−44)	−52 (−47)
Average precipitation inches (mm)	0.63 (16)	0.81 (21)	1.48 (38)	2.33 (59)	3.50 (89)	4.72 (120)	4.36 (111)	4.13 (105)	3.24 (82)	3.26 (83)	1.53 (39)	1.17 (30)	31.16 (793)
Average snowfall inches (cm)	10.60 (26.9)	11.90 (30.2)	8.30 (21.1)	4.70 (11.9)	0.20 (0.51)	0.00 (0.00)	0.00 (0.00)	0.00 (0.00)	0.00 (0.00)	2.00 (5.1)	9.20 (23.4)	12.30 (31.2)	59.2 (150.31)
Source 1: NOAA
Source 2: XMACIS (temp records & monthly max/mins)

== Festival ==
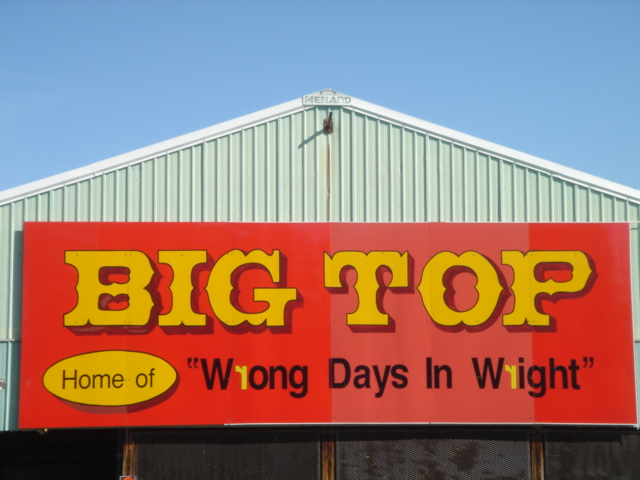
Wrong Days in Wright

There is an annual festival called "Wrong Days in Wright" on the third weekend in July.

The festival includes:

- Steak fry, fireworks and teen dance on Friday.
- Parade, smorgasbord, mixed doubles softball tournament, horseshoe tournament, craft show, and adult dance on Saturday.
- Pancake breakfast on Sunday morning.

== Demographics ==
Historical population
Census	Pop.	Note	%±
1930	191		—
1940	201		5.2%
1950	199		−1.0%
1960	169		−15.1%
1970	132		−21.9%
1980	162		22.7%
1990	144		−11.1%
2000	93		−35.4%
2010	127		36.6%
2020	168		32.3%
U.S. Decennial Census

=== 2010 census ===
As of the census of 2010, there were 127 people, 52 households, and 33 families living in the city. The population density was 81.9 inhabitants per square mile (31.6/km^{2}). There were 62 housing units at an average density of 40.0 per square mile (15.4/km^{2}). The racial makeup of the city was 97.6% White, 0.8% Native American, 0.8% Asian, and 0.8% from two or more races.

There were 52 households, of which 40.4% had children under the age of 18 living with them, 55.8% were married couples living together, 3.8% had a female householder with no husband present, 3.8% had a male householder with no wife present, and 36.5% were non-families. 32.7% of all households were made up of individuals, and 15.4% had someone living alone who was 65 years of age or older. The average household size was 2.44 and the average family size was 3.06.

The median age in the city was 37.5 years. 26.8% of residents were under the age of 18; 5.5% were between the ages of 18 and 24; 26.7% were from 25 to 44; 28.3% were from 45 to 64; and 12.6% were 65 years of age or older. The gender makeup of the city was 52.8% male and 47.2% female.

=== 2000 census ===
As of the census of 2000, there were 93 people, 42 households, and 21 families living in the city. The population density was 60.1 inhabitants per square mile (23.2/km^{2}). There were 44 housing units at an average density of 28.4 per square mile (11.0/km^{2}). The racial makeup of the city was 98.92% White and 1.08% from two or more races. 23.7% were of German, 22.6% Swedish, 15.1% Finnish, 8.6% Irish and 7.5% Lithuanian ancestry.

There were 42 households, out of which 23.8% had children under the age of 18 living with them, 38.1% were married couples living together, 7.1% had a female householder with no husband present, and 50.0% were non-families. 42.9% of all households were made up of individuals, and 28.6% had someone living alone who was 65 years of age or older. The average household size was 2.21 and the average family size was 3.10.

In the city, the population was spread out, with 22.6% under the age of 18, 7.5% from 18 to 24, 24.7% from 25 to 44, 19.4% from 45 to 64, and 25.8% who were 65 years of age or older. The median age was 40 years. For every 100 females, there were 89.8 males. For every 100 females age 18 and over, there were 89.5 males.

The median income for a household in the city was $39,375, and the median income for a family was $42,188. Males had a median income of $26,250 versus $18,750 for females. The per capita income for the city was $14,715. None of the families and 3.6% of the population were below the poverty line. Out of the total people living in poverty, 0.0% are under the age of 18 and 11.1% are 65 or older.
