= North Carlton, Minnesota =

Unorganized territory of Carlton County, Minnesota, US

Coordinates: 46°40′50″N 92°45′32″W

- Unorganized territory
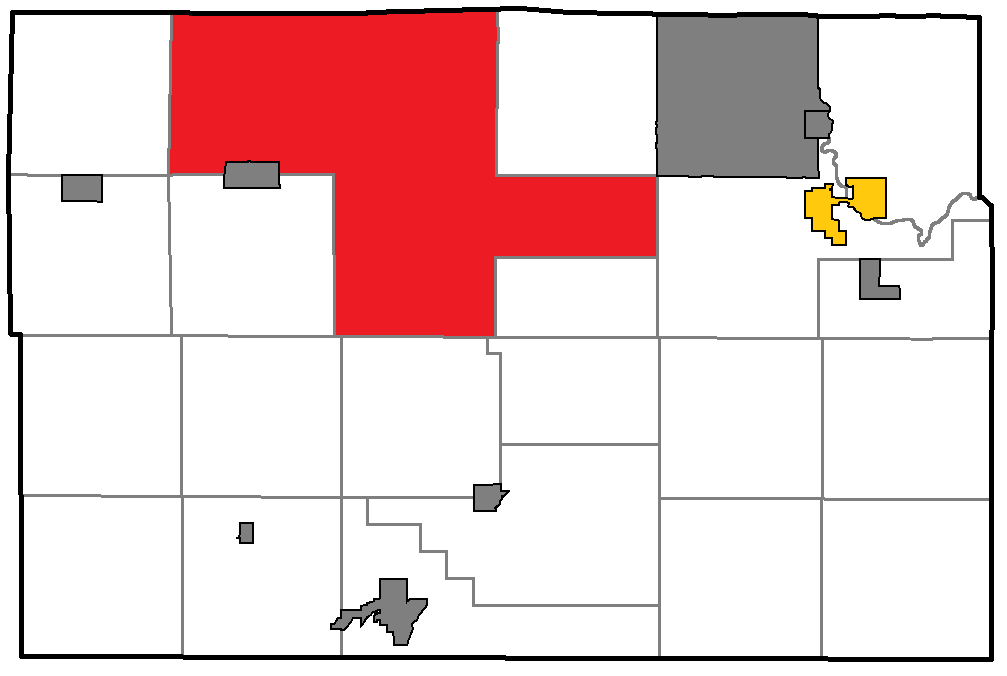
- Location of North Carlton within Carlton County, Minnesota
- Country: United States
- State: Minnesota
- County: Carlton

Area
  - Total: 127.22 sq mi (329.5 km^{2})
  - Land: 125.19 sq mi (324.2 km^{2})
  - Water: 2.03 sq mi (5.3 km^{2})

Population (2020)
  - Total: 976
  - Density: 7.80/sq mi (3.01/km^{2})
- Time zone: UTC-6 (Central (CST))
  - Summer (DST): UTC-5 (CDT)
- Area code: 218

North Carlton is an unorganized territory in Carlton County, Minnesota, United States. The population was 976 at the 2020 census.

The unincorporated community of Sawyer is located within North Carlton Unorganized Territory.

The unorganized territory includes the former townships of Corona, Progress, Red Clover, and Sawyer, which were merged into North Carlton unorganized territory before the 2000 census.

== Geography ==
According to the United States Census Bureau, the unorganized territory has a total area of 127.2 square miles (329.3 km^{2}), of which 124.3 square miles (322.0 km^{2}) is land and 2.8 square miles (7.4 km^{2}) (2.23%) is water.

== Demographics ==
As of the census of 2000, there were 958 people, 329 households, and 243 families residing in the unorganized territory. The population density was 7.7 inhabitants per square mile (3.0/km^{2}). There were 443 housing units at an average density of 3.6 per square mile (1.4/km^{2}). The racial makeup of the unorganized territory was 84.97% White, 0.10% Black or African American, 11.59% Native American, 0.31% Asian, 0.10% from other races, and 2.92% from two or more races. Hispanic or Latino of any race were 0.52% of the population.

There were 329 households, out of which 38.9% had children under the age of 18 living with them, 59.6% were married couples living together, 7.3% had a female householder with no husband present, and 26.1% were non-families. 22.5% of all households were made up of individuals, and 8.8% had someone living alone who was 65 years of age or older. The average household size was 2.77 and the average family size was 3.23.

In the unorganized territory, the population was spread out, with 31.0% under the age of 18, 6.5% from 18 to 24, 25.2% from 25 to 44, 22.3% from 45 to 64, and 15.0% who were 65 years of age or older. The median age was 37 years. For every 100 females, there were 93.9 males. For every 100 females age 18 and over, there were 94.4 males.

The median income for a household in the unorganized territory was $31,484, and the median income for a family was $35,729. Males had a median income of $30,735 versus $25,147 for females. The per capita income for the unorganized territory was $14,948. About 7.6% of families and 9.0% of the population were below the poverty line, including 7.8% of those under age 18 and 26.4% of those age 65 or over.
