= Cromwell, Minnesota =

City in Minnesota, United States

Cromwell
- City
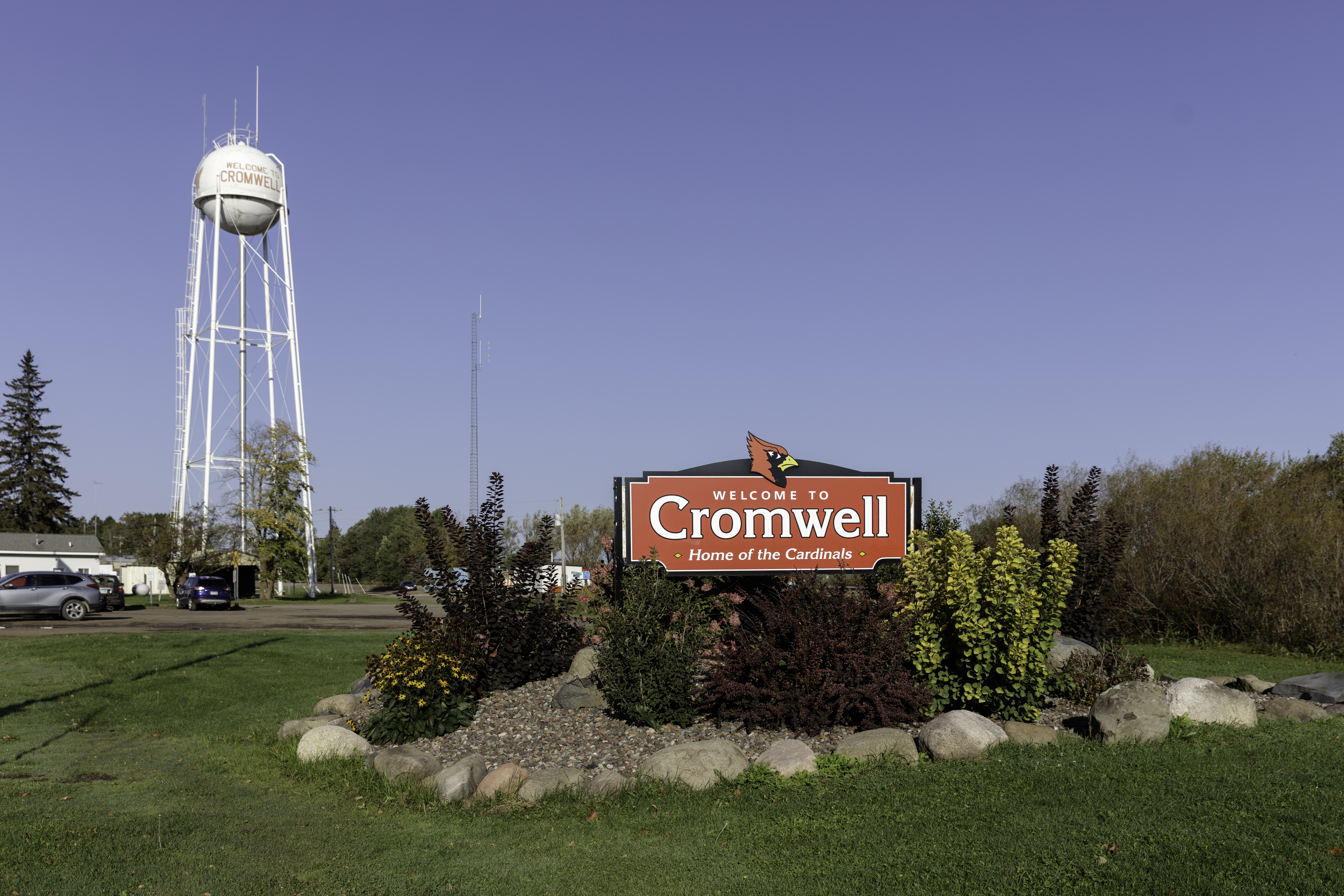
- Welcome to Cromwell sign along MN 210

- Location of the city of Cromwell within Carlton County, Minnesota
- Coordinates: 46°40′47″N 92°52′37″W
- Country: United States
- State: Minnesota
- County: Carlton

Area
  - Total: 2.03 sq mi (5.26 km^{2})
  - Land: 1.84 sq mi (4.76 km^{2})
  - Water: 0.19 sq mi (0.49 km^{2})
- Elevation: 1,300 ft (400 m)

Population (2020)
  - Total: 240
  - Density: 130.5/sq mi (50.39/km^{2})
- Time zone: UTC-6 (Central (CST))
  - Summer (DST): UTC-5 (CDT)
- ZIP code: 55726
- Area code: 218
- FIPS code: 27-13780
- GNIS feature ID: 0642448
- Website: https://www.cromwellmn.org/

Cromwell is a city in Carlton County, Minnesota, United States. The population was 240 at the 2020 census.

Cromwell is located along Minnesota State Highways 73 and 210.

== History ==
The post office was established at Cromwell in 1882. Cromwell was organized in 1891, receiving its name from the Northern Pacific Railway. Cromwell was incorporated in 1903.

== Geography ==
According to the United States Census Bureau, the city has a total area of 2.01 square miles (5.21 km^{2}), of which 1.84 square miles (4.77 km^{2}) is land and 0.17 square miles (0.44 km^{2}) is water.

Cromwell is 22 miles west of Cloquet. Cromwell is 40 miles west-southwest of Duluth, and 22 miles north of Moose Lake.

== Demographics ==
Historical population
Census	Pop.	Note	%±
1910	143		—
1920	164		14.7%
1930	207		26.2%
1940	214		3.4%
1950	197		−7.9%
1960	187		−5.1%
1970	181		−3.2%
1980	229		26.5%
1990	221		−3.5%
2000	143		−35.3%
2010	234		63.6%
2020	240		2.6%
U.S. Decennial Census

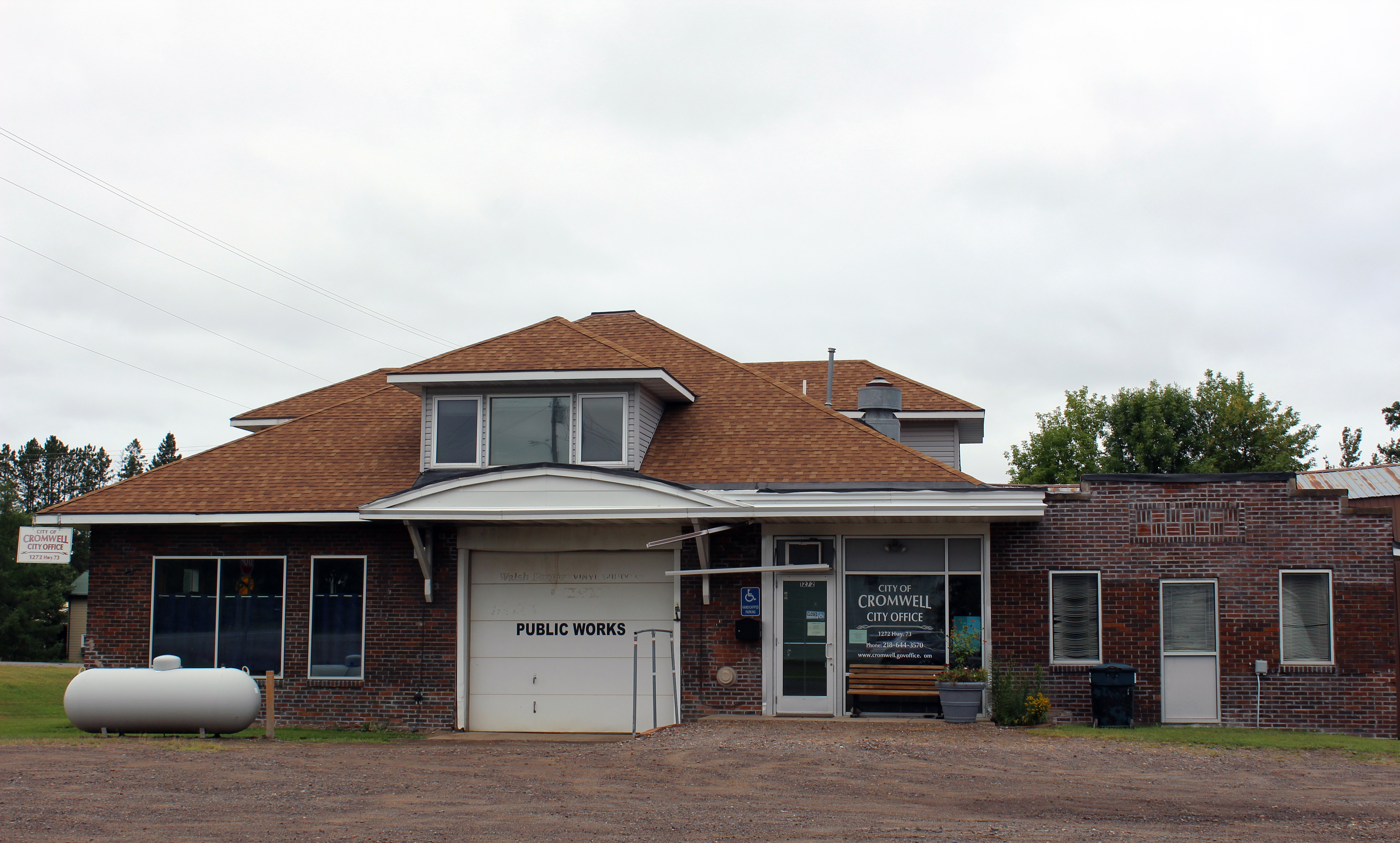
City of Cromwell City Office

=== 2010 census ===
As of the census of 2010, there were 234 people, 130 households, and 50 families living in the city. The population density was 127.2 inhabitants per square mile (49.1/km^{2}). There were 180 housing units at an average density of 97.8 per square mile (37.8/km^{2}). The racial makeup of the city was 97.4% White, 0.4% Native American, 0.4% from other races, and 1.7% from two or more races. Hispanic or Latino of any race were 0.9% of the population.

There were 130 households, of which 20.0% had children under the age of 18 living with them, 27.7% were married couples living together, 7.7% had a female householder with no husband present, 3.1% had a male householder with no wife present, and 61.5% were non-families. 55.4% of all households were made up of individuals, and 43.1% had someone living alone who was 65 years of age or older. The average household size was 1.80 and the average family size was 2.80.

The median age in the city was 55.3 years. 20.1% of residents were under the age of 18; 4.3% were between the ages of 18 and 24; 17.9% were from 25 to 44; 17.6% were from 45 to 64; and 40.2% were 65 years of age or older. The gender makeup of the city was 42.7% male and 57.3% female.

=== 2000 census ===
As of the census of 2000, there were 143 people, 65 households, and 39 families living in the city. The population density was 78.7 inhabitants per square mile (30.4/km^{2}). There were 94 housing units at an average density of 51.7 per square mile (20.0/km^{2}). The racial makeup of the city was 97.20% White, 0.70% Native American, and 2.10% from two or more races. Hispanic or Latino of any race were 0.70% of the population. 36.7% were of Finnish, 21.1% German, 14.7% Norwegian and 6.4% Swedish ancestry according to Census 2000.

There were 65 households, out of which 21.5% had children under the age of 18 living with them, 52.3% were married couples living together, 9.2% had a female householder with no husband present, and 38.5% were non-families. 35.4% of all households were made up of individuals, and 13.8% had someone living alone who was 65 years of age or older. The average household size was 2.20 and the average family size was 2.88.

In the city, the population was 22.4% under the age of 18, 4.2% from 18 to 24, 25.9% from 25 to 44, 25.2% from 45 to 64, and 22.4% who were 65 years of age or older. The median age was 44 years. For every 100 females, there were 113.4 males. For every 100 females age 18 and over, there were 109.4 males.

The median income for a household in the city was $25,000, and the median income for a family was $31,875. Males had a median income of $26,250 versus $21,250 for females. The per capita income for the city was $16,605. There were 15.4% of families and 20.3% of the population living below the poverty line, including 33.3% of under eighteens and 7.9% of those over 64.

== Education ==
Cromwell–Wright School consists of both an elementary school and a high school. The school mascot is the cardinal.

== Gallery ==
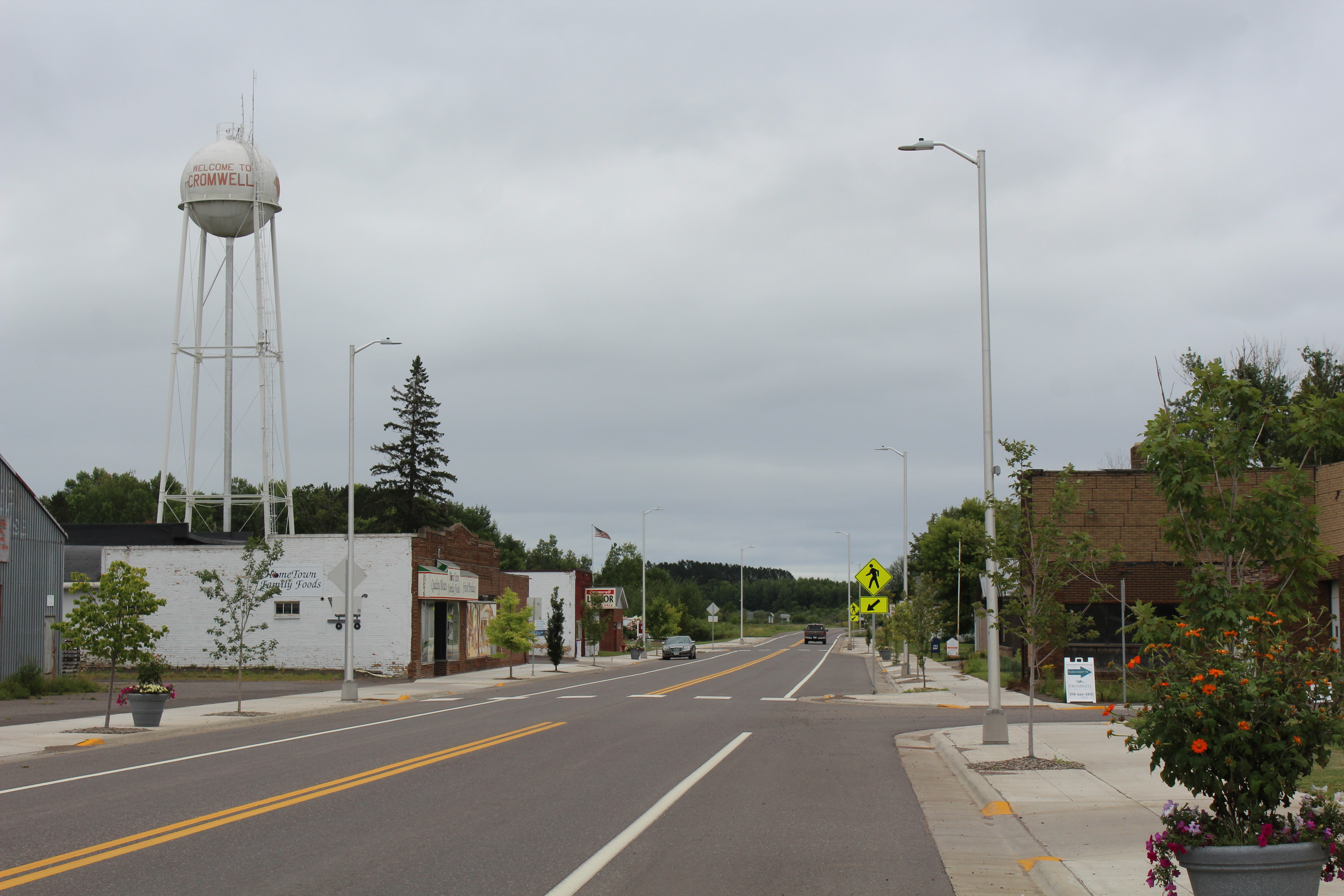
Hwy 210

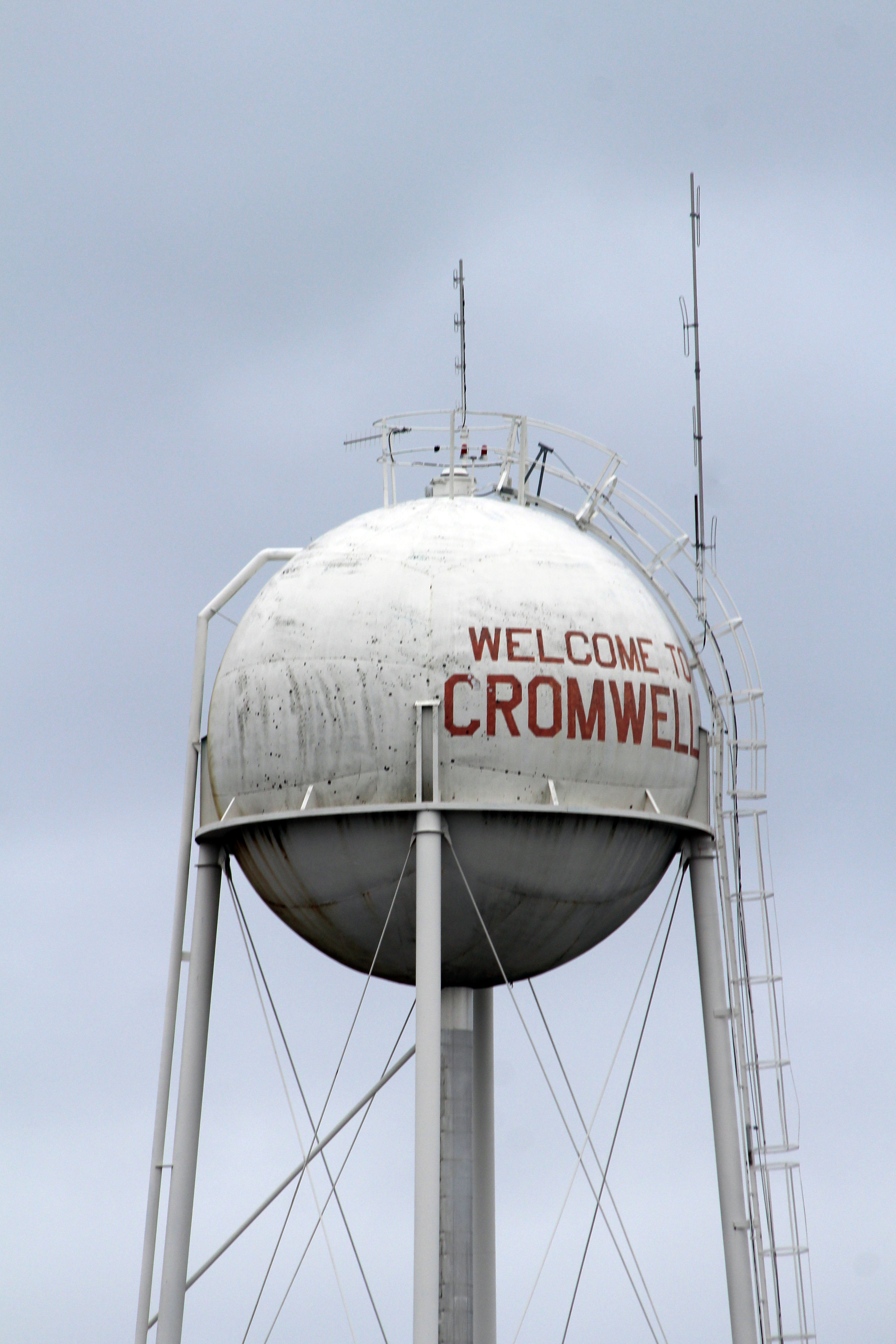
Water tower

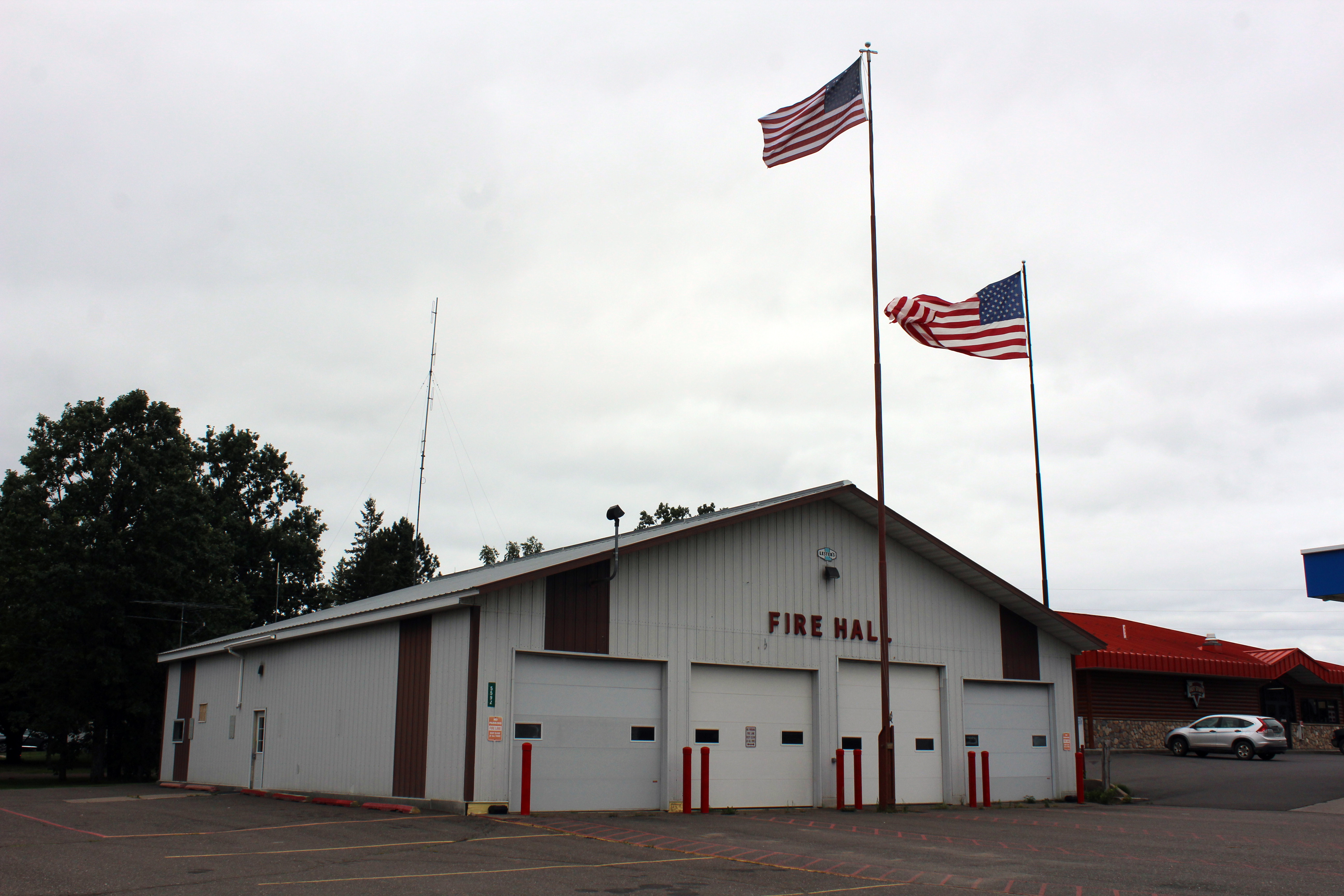
Fire Hall

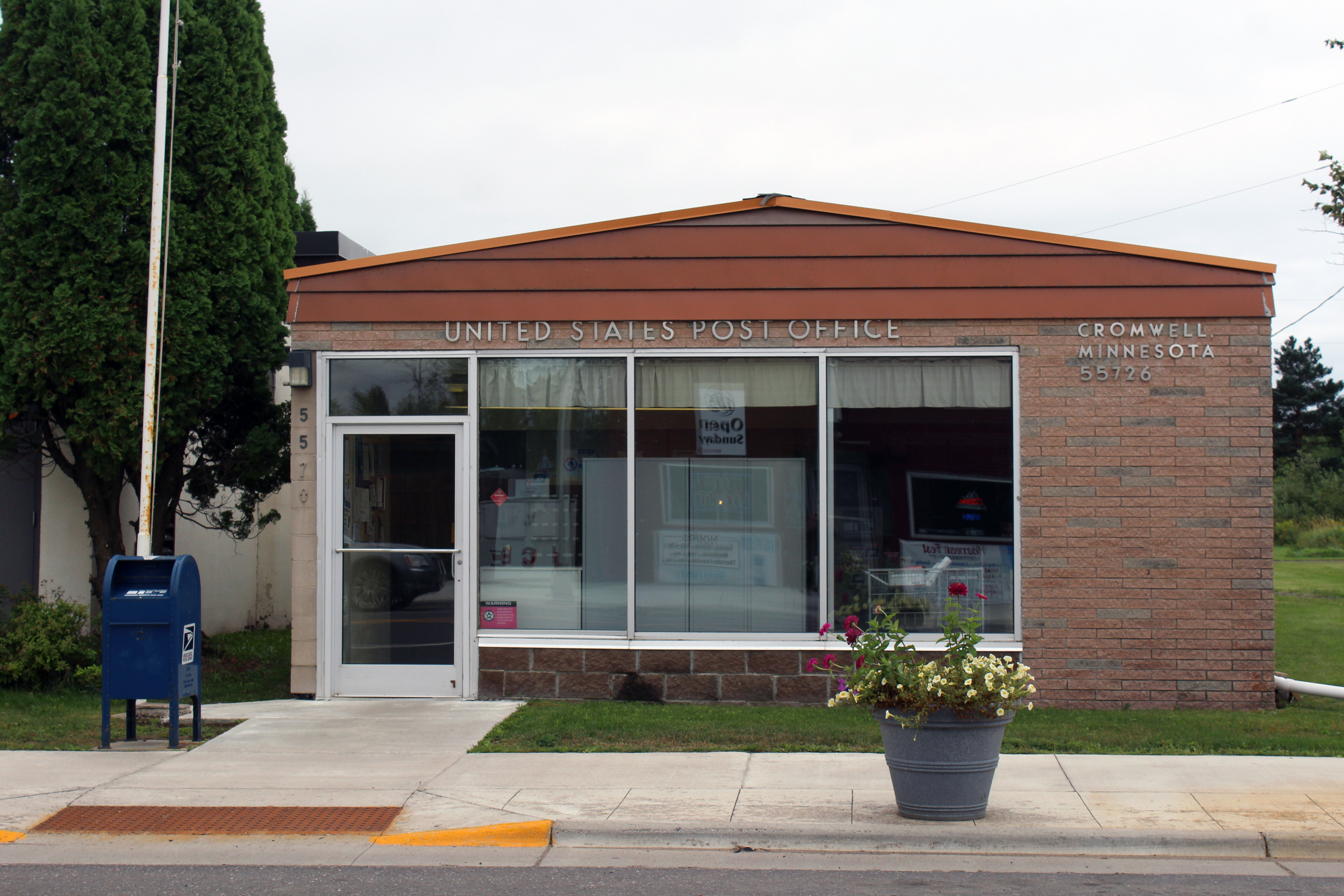
Post office
