= Midway Township, St. Louis County, Minnesota =

Midway Township, Minnesota
- Township
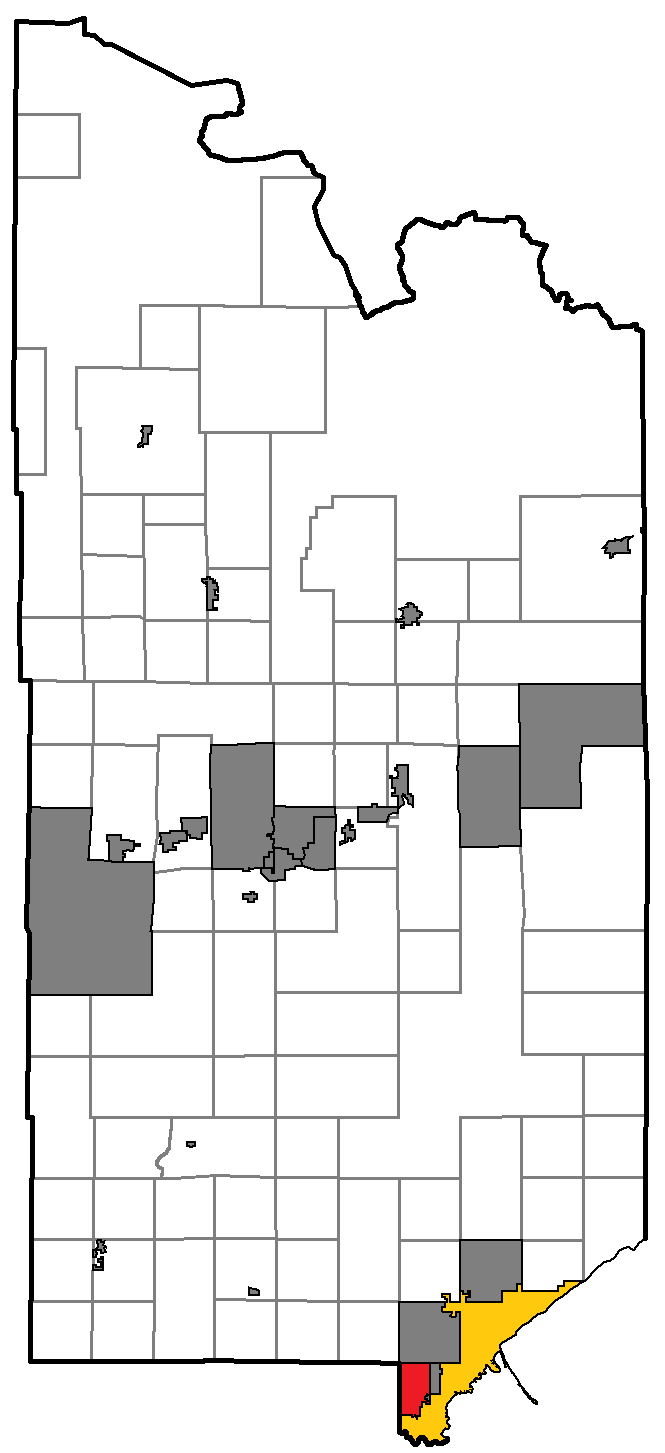
- Location of Midway Township within St. Louis County, Minnesota
- Coordinates: 46°43′39″N 92°16′11″W
- Country: United States
- State: Minnesota
- County: Saint Louis

Area
  - Total: 18.0 sq mi (46.6 km^{2})
  - Land: 18.0 sq mi (46.6 km^{2})
  - Water: 0 sq mi (0.0 km^{2})
- Elevation: 1,421 ft (433 m)

Population (2020)
  - Total: 1,431
  - Density: 79.5/sq mi (30.7/km^{2})
- Time zone: UTC-6 (Central (CST))
  - Summer (DST): UTC-5 (CDT)
- ZIP codes: 55810
- Area code: 218
- FIPS code: 27-42056
- GNIS feature ID: 0664968
- Website: https://mnmidwaytownshipslc.gov/

Midway Township is a township in Saint Louis County, Minnesota, United States. The population was 1,431 at the 2020 census.

Midway Road, Becks Road, and Interstate Highway 35 are three of the main routes in the township. Other routes include North Cloquet Road, Lindahl Road, Ugstad Road, and Stark Road.

== Geography ==
Midway Township is a half a township with 18 square miles. According to the United States Census Bureau, the township has a total area of 18.0 square miles (46.6 km^{2}), all land.

Mission Creek, Sargent Creek, and Stewart Creek, all flow through Midway Township. The Midway River flows through at the northwest corner of the township.

=== Adjacent townships, cities, and communities ===
The following municipalities and communities are adjacent to Midway Township :

- Solway Township (northwest)
- The city of Hermantown (north)
- The city of Proctor (east)
- The city of Duluth (south and east)
- The neighborhood of Gary – New Duluth (south)
- The neighborhood of Fond du Lac (south)
- Thomson Township of Carlton County (west)
- The unincorporated community of Esko (west)

Jay Cooke State Park is also to the immediate south of Midway Township.

Ugstad Road runs north–south along Midway Township's eastern boundary line with adjacent city of Proctor. Railroad Avenue also serves briefly as the boundary line between Midway Township and Proctor in the northeast corner of the township. Russell Road runs north–south along Midway Township's eastern boundary line with adjacent city of Duluth.

Solway Road runs north–south along Midway Township's western boundary line with adjacent Thomson Township of Carlton County.

Saint Louis River Road runs east–west along Midway Township's northern boundary line with adjacent city of Hermantown.

Short Line Park along Becks Road is located near Midway Township's southern boundary line with adjacent city of Duluth and the neighborhood of Gary–New Duluth.

Skyline Parkway passes through the southeast portion of Midway Township.

== Demographics ==
As of the census of 2000, there were 1,479 people, 495 households, and 386 families residing in the township. The population density was 82.1 inhabitants per square mile (31.7/km^{2}). There were 509 housing units at an average density of 28.3 per square mile (10.9/km^{2}). The racial makeup of the township was 96.28% White, 2.43% Native American, 0.20% from other races, and 1.08% from two or more races. Hispanic or Latino of any race were 0.54% of the population. 15.8% were of German, 15.3% Swedish, 14.9% Norwegian, 10.6% Finnish, 7.4% Polish, 6.3% Irish and 5.1% French ancestry according to Census 2000.

There were 495 households, out of which 32.7% had children under the age of 18 living with them, 66.7% were married couples living together, 6.7% had a female householder with no husband present, and 22.0% were non-families. 17.2% of all households were made up of individuals, and 7.9% had someone living alone who was 65 years of age or older. The average household size was 2.66 and the average family size was 3.01.

In the township the population was spread out, with 23.2% under the age of 18, 5.5% from 18 to 24, 24.3% from 25 to 44, 25.5% from 45 to 64, and 21.6% who were 65 years of age or older. The median age was 43 years. For every 100 females, there were 95.9 males. For every 100 females age 18 and over, there were 91.6 males.

The median income for a household in the township was $42,411, and the median income for a family was $47,614. Males had a median income of $39,554 versus $22,500 for females. The per capita income for the township was $17,487. About 3.4% of families and 5.4% of the population were below the poverty line, including 2.4% of those under age 18 and 3.2% of those age 65 or over.

== Politics ==
Presidential election results

Precinct General Election Results
Year	Republican	Democratic	Third parties
2020	48.9% 478	49.1% 480	2.0% 20
2016	46.3% 398	46.5% 399	7.2% 62
2012	34.4% 303	64.0% 563	1.6% 14
2008	35.5% 308	61.9% 537	2.6% 22
2004	36.7% 311	61.9% 525	1.4% 12
2000	34.4% 258	57.3% 430	8.3% 63
1996	28.1% 201	59.4% 425	12.5% 90
1992	23.9% 182	55.0% 420	21.1% 161
1988	30.0% 219	70.0% 510	0.0% 0
1984	27.6% 223	72.4% 586	0.0% 0
1980	25.4% 197	67.2% 522	7.4% 58
1976	23.0% 172	75.3% 564	1.7% 13
1968	19.9% 138	77.6% 538	2.5% 17
1964	14.7% 100	84.9% 578	0.4% 3
1960	30.3% 194	69.2% 443	0.5% 3

== See also ==
- County Road 13 – Midway Road
- County Road 3 – Becks Road
- Interstate 35 in Minnesota
