= Minnesota State Highway 45 =

State highway in Minnesota, United States

Trunk Highway 45
- MN 45 highlighted in red

Route information
- Maintained by MnDOT
- Length: 2.628 mi (4.229 km)
- Existed: 1934–present

Major junctions
- South end: MN 210 / CSAH 1 at Carlton
- North end: I-35 / CSAH 45 at Scanlon

Location
- Country: United States
- State: Minnesota
- Counties: Carlton

Highway system
- Minnesota Trunk Highway System; Interstate; US; State; Legislative; Scenic
← MN 44	→ MN 46

Minnesota State Highway 45 (MN 45) is a short 2.628-mile-long (4.229 km) highway in northeast Minnesota, which runs from its intersection with State Highway 210 (Chestnut Avenue) and Carlton County Road 1 in the city of Carlton and continues north to its northern terminus at its interchange with Interstate 35 and Carlton County Highway 45 in the city of Scanlon. The route passes through the city of Carlton.

== Route description ==
State Highway 45 serves as a short connector route between Carlton, Scanlon, and Interstate 35 in northeast Minnesota. It maintains Minnesota Constitutional Route 1 through the city of Carlton, following the historic route of former U.S. Highway 61.

Highway 45 parallels the Saint Louis River.

Jay Cooke State Park is located 3 miles east of the junction of Highways 45 and 210 at Carlton. The park entrance is located on Highway 210 adjacent to Thomson.

Highway 45 is also known as Third Street N in the city of Carlton.

The route has a junction with Carlton County Road 3 (Carlton Road) at the northern city limits of Carlton.

== History ==
State Highway 45 does not currently include any of its original marked extent. The surviving segment of State Highway 45 (from Carlton to Scanlon) was part of the original U.S. Highway 61 from 1934 to 1968. The route was paved as early as 1929.

The route originally designated State Highway 45 from 1934 to 1995 is the old extension of this route west of Interstate 35 between Scanlon and downtown Cloquet. This section was turned back to Carlton County / city of Cloquet maintenance c. 1995 and is now designated as County Highway 45.

== Major intersections ==
The entire route is in Carlton County.

Location	mi	km	Destinations	Notes
Carlton	0.000	0.000	MN 210 / CSAH 61 south / CSAH 1 south	Southern terminus; southern end of CSAH 61 concurrency
Carlton	0.576	0.927	CSAH 3 (Carlton Road)	
Cloquet	2.439– 2.631	3.925– 4.234	I-35 / CSAH 45 / CSAH 61 north	Northern terminus; northern end of CSAH 61 concurrency; roadway continues as CSAH 45; folded diamond interchange
1.000 mi = 1.609 km; 1.000 km = 0.621 mi: Concurrency terminus
