= Harney, Minnesota =

Unincorporated community in Minnesota, US

Harney
- Unincorporated community
- Location within Minnesota
- Coordinates: 46°43′18″N 92°20′01″W
- Country: United States
- State: Minnesota
- County: Carlton County
- Township: Thomson Township
- Elevation: 1,198 ft (365 m)
- ZIP code: 55733
- Area code: 218
- GNIS feature ID: 0644679

Harney is an unincorporated community in Thomson Township, Carlton County, Minnesota, United States. It lies between Cloquet and Duluth.

Harney is located 6 miles east (northeast) of the city of Cloquet; and 15 miles southwest of the city of Duluth.

North Cloquet Road, Marks Road, and Harney Road are three of the main routes in Harney.

Canosia Road and Carlton County Road 61 are nearby.

The community of Esko is adjacent to Harney.
