= Thomson Township, Carlton County, Minnesota =

Thomson Township, Minnesota
- Township
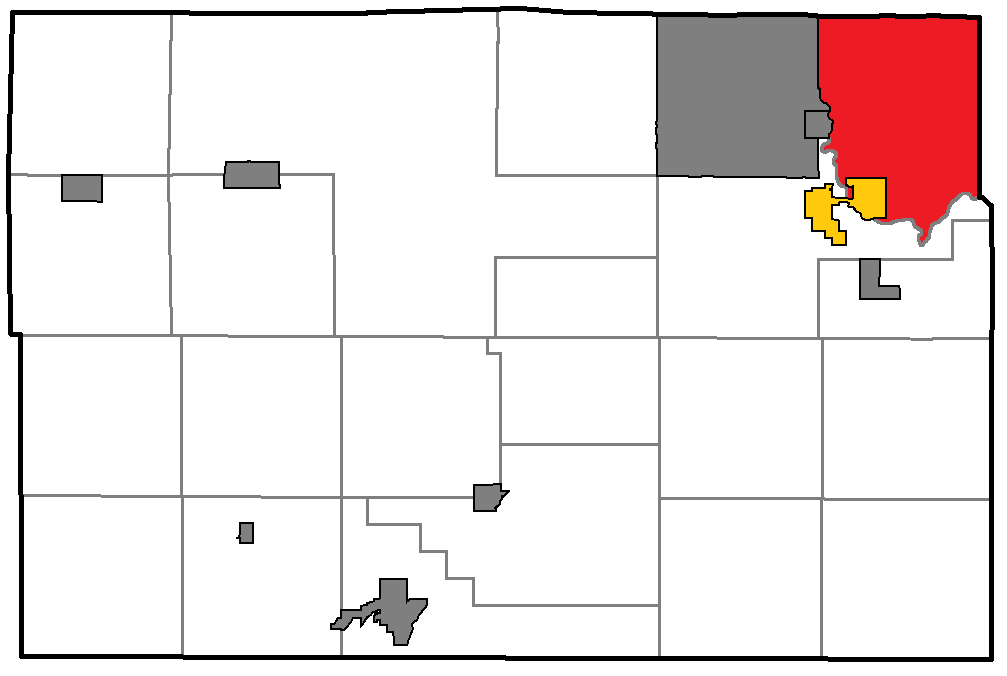
- Location of Thomson Township within Carlton County, Minnesota
- Coordinates: 46°42′46″N 92°21′47″W
- Country: United States
- State: Minnesota
- County: Carlton

Area
  - Total: 39.9 sq mi (103.3 km^{2})
  - Land: 39.7 sq mi (102.7 km^{2})
  - Water: 0.23 sq mi (0.6 km^{2})
- Elevation: 1,165 ft (355 m)

Population (2020)
  - Total: 5,465
  - Density: 137.8/sq mi (53.21/km^{2})
- Time zone: UTC-6 (Central (CST))
  - Summer (DST): UTC-5 (CDT)
- FIPS code: 27-64768
- GNIS feature ID: 0665784
- Website: https://townofthomsonmn.gov/

Thomson Township is a township in Carlton County, Minnesota, United States. The population was 5,465 as of the 2020 census. Thomson Township took its name from the city of Thomson.

Interstate 35 and Carlton County Road 61 are two of the main routes in the township.

The community of Esko is within Thomson Township.

== Geography ==
According to the United States Census Bureau, the township has an area of 39.9 mi^{2} (103.3 km^{2}), of which 39.7 mi^{2} (102.7 km^{2}) is land and 0.2 mi^{2} (0.6 km^{2}) (0.63%) is water.

The east quarter of the city of Scanlon and the north three-quarters of the city of Thomson are within Thomson Township geographically but are separate entities.

The Saint Louis River flows through at the western edge of Thomson Township.

The Midway River and Crystal Creek both flow through Thomson Township.

=== Unincorporated communities ===
- Esko
- Harney

=== Major highway ===
- Interstate 35

=== Lakes ===
- Forbay Lake – vast majority of the lake is within the township

=== Adjacent townships, cities, and communities ===
The following municipalities and communities are adjacent to Thomson Township:

- Solway Township, St. Louis County (north)
- Midway Township, St. Louis County (east)
- Twin Lakes Township (southwest)
- Brevator Township, St. Louis County (northwest)
- The city of Cloquet (west)

Jay Cooke State Park is immediately south of Thomson Township.

=== Cemeteries ===
The township contains three cemeteries, Finnish Apostolic, Saint Matthew's and Thomson, that are still in use, and one that is no longer platted, the Pioneer Cemetery at Jay Cooke State Park.

== Demographics ==
As of the census of 2000, there were 4,361 people, 1,527 households, and 1,244 families residing in the township. The population density was 110.0 inhabitants per square mile (42.5/km^{2}). There were 1,555 housing units at an average density of 39.2 per square mile (15.1/km^{2}). The racial makeup of the township was 97.89% White, 0.21% African American, 0.62% Native American, 0.60% Asian, 0.02% from other races, and 0.66% from two or more races. Hispanic or Latino of any race were 0.41% of the population. 26.0% were of Finnish, 13.5% Norwegian, 11.1% Swedish and 6.5% Irish ancestry.

There were 1,527 households, out of which 41.5% had children under the age of 18 living with them, 73.4% were married couples living together, 5.6% had a female householder with no husband present, and 18.5% were non-families. 15.1% of all households were made up of individuals, and 5.6% had someone living alone who was 65 years of age or older. The average household size was 2.85 and the average family size was 3.18.

In the township the population was spread out, with 29.3% under the age of 18, 6.2% from 18 to 24, 29.6% from 25 to 44, 25.6% from 45 to 64, and 9.3% who were 65 years of age or older. The median age was 37 years. For every 100 females, there were 101.5 males. For every 100 females age 18 and over, there were 101.5 males.

The median income for a household in the township was $53,026, and the median income for a family was $58,977. Males had a median income of $44,547 versus $25,270 for females. The per capita income for the township was $20,045. About 3.2% of families and 5.4% of the population were below the poverty line, including 7.4% of those under age 18 and 4.4% of those age 65 or over.
