= Carlton, Minnesota =

City in Minnesota, United States

Carlton
- City
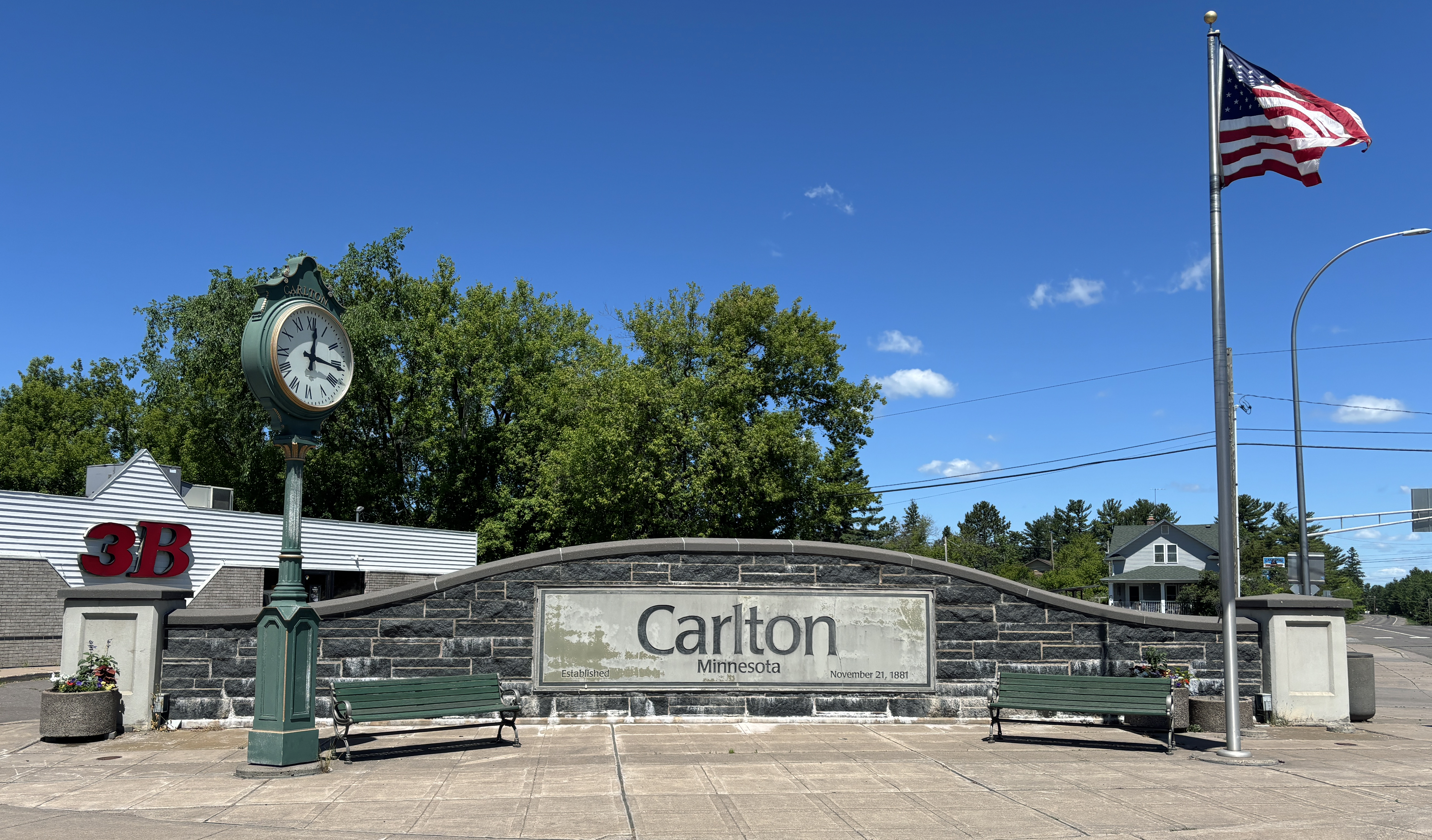
- Plaza in Carlton

- Location of the city of Carlton within Carlton County, Minnesota
- Coordinates: 46°39′50″N 92°25′30″W
- Country: United States
- State: Minnesota
- County: Carlton
- Founded: 1881

Area
  - Total: 4.00 sq mi (10.37 km^{2})
  - Land: 3.77 sq mi (9.76 km^{2})
  - Water: 0.23 sq mi (0.60 km^{2})
- Elevation: 1,080 ft (330 m)

Population (2020)
  - Total: 948
  - Estimate (2022): 965
  - Density: 251.5/sq mi (97.12/km^{2})
- Time zone: UTC-6 (Central (CST))
  - Summer (DST): UTC-5 (CDT)
- ZIP code: 55718
- Area code: 218
- FIPS code: 27-10018
- GNIS feature ID: 0640914
- Website: cityofcarlton.com

Carlton is a city and the county seat of Carlton County, Minnesota, United States. The population was 948 at the 2020 census. The town sits on the northwestern edge of Jay Cooke State Park.

Minnesota State Highways 45 and 210 and County Roads 1 and 3 are four of Carlton's main routes. It is five miles south of Cloquet and 21 miles southwest of Duluth.

== History ==
In 1870, the Northern Pacific Railroad finished a stretch of track that linked Duluth to St. Paul. Temporary shacks were erected for the workmen at the place that was soon known as "Northern Pacific Junction". In 1881, this settlement was incorporated as Carlton. It takes its name from former State Senator Reuben B. Carlton.

Carlton absorbed the city of Thomson in 2015, with the approval of a majority of voters in both cities.

== Geography ==
According to the United States Census Bureau, the city has an area of 2.27 square miles (5.88 km^{2}), of which 2.06 square miles (5.34 km^{2}) is land and 0.21 square miles (0.54 km^{2}) is water.

The Saint Louis River is nearby. Carlton is the home of Black Bear Casino Resort.

Thomson Dam, Thomson Reservoir, and Jay Cooke State Park are also nearby, and the Willard Munger Bicycle Trail runs through the city of Carlton.

== Demographics ==
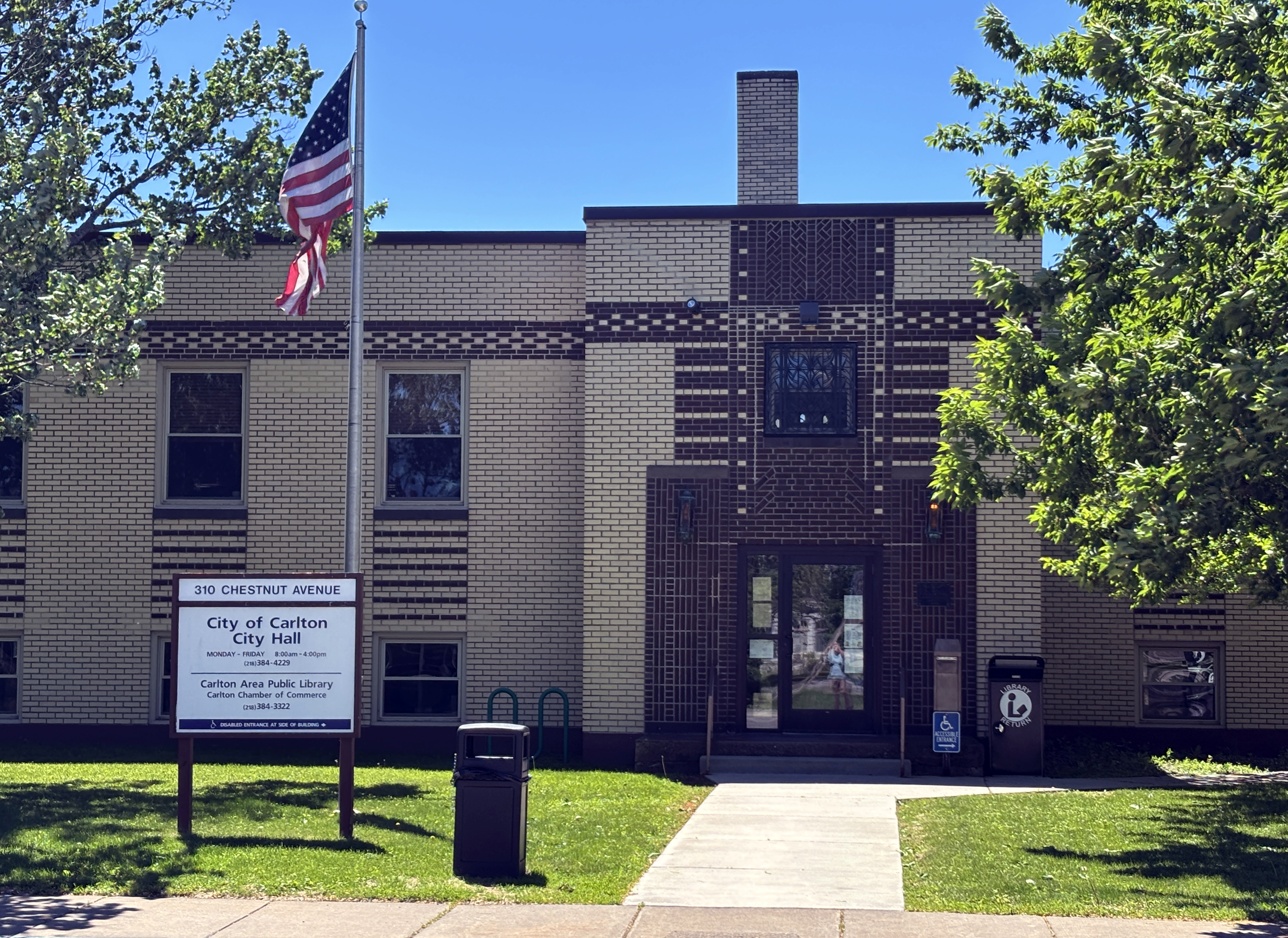
Carlton City Hall

Historical population
Census	Pop.	Note	%±
1880	168		—
1890	612		264.3%
1900	449		−26.6%
1910	597		33.0%
1920	700		17.3%
1930	687		−1.9%
1940	700		1.9%
1950	652		−6.9%
1960	862		32.2%
1970	884		2.6%
1980	862		−2.5%
1990	923		7.1%
2000	810		−12.2%
2010	862		6.4%
2020	948		10.0%
2022 (est.)	965		1.8%
U.S. Decennial Census; 2020 Census

=== 2010 census ===
As of the census of 2010, there were 862 people, 337 households, and 175 families living in the city. The population density was 418.4 inhabitants per square mile (161.5/km^{2}). There were 355 housing units at an average density of 172.3 per square mile (66.5/km^{2}). The racial makeup of the city was 92.0% White, 0.5% African American, 4.3% Native American, 0.3% Asian, 0.5% from other races, and 2.4% from two or more races. Hispanic or Latino of any race were 1.5% of the population.

There were 337 households, of which 24.3% had children under the age of 18 living with them, 35.6% were married couples living together, 11.3% had a female householder with no husband present, 5.0% had a male householder with no wife present, and 48.1% were non-families. 43.3% of all households were made up of individuals, and 25.8% had someone living alone who was 65 years of age or older. The average household size was 2.09 and the average family size was 2.82.

The median age in the city was 44.2 years. 18% of residents were under the age of 18; 7.6% were between the ages of 18 and 24; 25.2% were from 25 to 44; 21.4% were from 45 to 64; and 27.7% were 65 years of age or older. The gender makeup of the city was 44.8% male and 55.2% female.

=== 2000 census ===
As of the census of 2000, there were 810 people, 306 households, and 179 families living in the city. The population density was 393.8 inhabitants per square mile (152.0/km^{2}). There were 325 housing units at an average density of 158.0 per square mile (61.0/km^{2}). The racial makeup of the city was 95.19% White, 3.46% Native American, 0.12% from other races, and 1.23% from two or more races. Hispanic or Latino of any race were 0.62% of the population. 25.1% were of German, 15.3% Norwegian, 12.4% Finnish, 9.8% Swedish, 6.0% Polish and 5.5% Irish ancestry according to Census 2000.

There were 306 households, out of which 26.2% had children under the age of 18 living with them, 43.1% were married couples living together, 11.1% had a female householder with no husband present, and 41.5% were non-families. 37.3% of all households were made up of individuals, and 23.5% had someone living alone who was 65 years of age or older. The average household size was 2.22 and the average family size was 2.93.

In the city, the population was spread out, with 20.5% under the age of 18, 7.4% from 18 to 24, 24.2% from 25 to 44, 19.8% from 45 to 64, and 28.1% who were 65 years of age or older. The median age was 44. For every 100 females, there were 93.3 males. For every 100 females 18 and over, there were 89.4 males.

The median income for a household in the city was $31,477, and the median income for a family was $44,792. Males had a median income of $32,614 versus $21,167 for females. The per capita income for the city was $15,586. About 6.3% of families and 9.7% of the population were below the poverty line, including 13.1% of those under 18 and 8.8% of those 65 or over.

== Festival ==
Carlton Daze is the name of the city of Carlton's celebration that is usually held annually in late July.

== Education ==
Most of Carlton is in the Carlton School District while a small section is in the Esko Public School District.
