= Thomson Dam (Minnesota) =

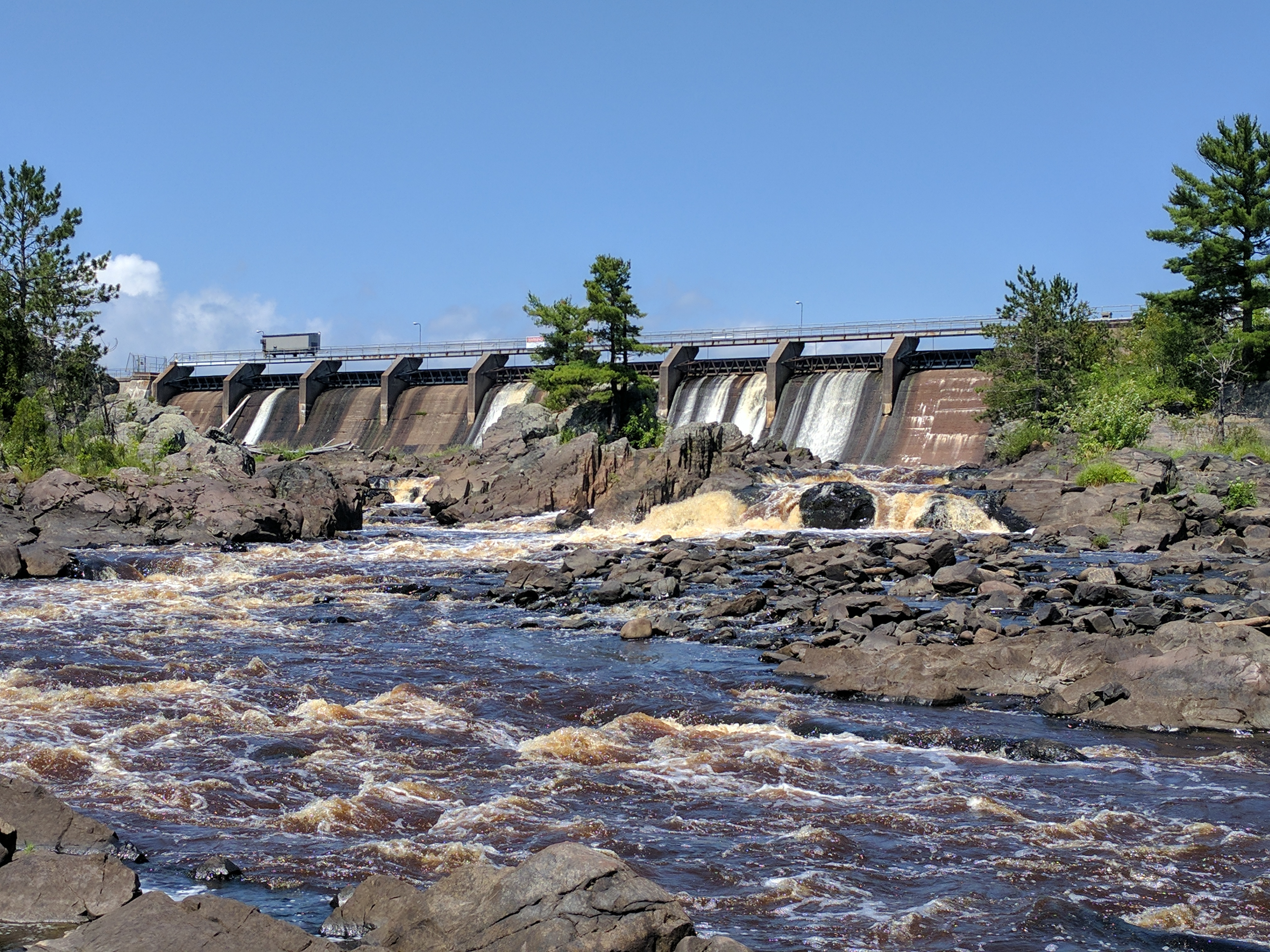
- Downstream face of the main Thomson Dam on the St. Louis River in 2017

- Location within Minnesota
- Location: Carlton County, Minnesota, U.S.
- Coordinates: 46°39′59.10″N 92°24′25.80″W
- Purpose: Power
- Status: Operational
- Construction began: 1905
- Opening date: 1907; 1914-48 expanded 2012 damaged 2014 reconstructed
- Built by: Great Northern Railway
- Owner: Minnesota Power

Dam and spillways
- Type of dam: Earth Embankment, Concrete Gravity, Arch
- Impounds: Saint Louis River
- Height: Main: 15 ft (4.6 m); Canal: 45 ft (14 m)
- Length: Main: 1,600 ft (490 m); Canal: 3,500 ft (1,100 m)
- Spillways: 2
- Spillway type: gated
- Spillway capacity: 60,000 cu ft/s (1,700 m^{3}/s)

Reservoir
- Creates: Thomson Reservoir
- Total capacity: 4,352 acre⋅ft (5,368,000 m^{3})
- Catchment area: 9,154 mi^{2} (23,710 km^{2})
- Surface area: 649 acres (263 ha)

Thomson Hydro
- Coordinates: 46°39′17.91″N 92°20′1.032″W
- Hydraulic head: 375 ft (114 m)
- Turbines: 6
- Installed capacity: 72 MW
- Annual generation: 280 GWh
- Website http://mphydro.com/

Thomson Dam, also known as the Thomson Hydro Station or Thomson Water Project, is an embankment and concrete gravity dam on the Saint Louis River near the town of Thomson in northeastern Minnesota, United States. It consists of a 1600-foot (488 m) long primary structure and multiple supplementary dams which, together with precambrian rock outcrops known as the Thomson formation, impound the river to create Thomson Reservoir.

The tallest dam in the complex is 51.6 feet (16 m) and the longest is 3500 feet (1067 m). A series of gate houses, a canal, forebay, and underground penstocks supply a hydropower plant located 3 miles away in Jay Cooke State Park. With an installed capacity of 72 MW and an annual generation of approximately 280 GWh, the Thomson project is the largest hydroelectric facility in the state.

== History ==
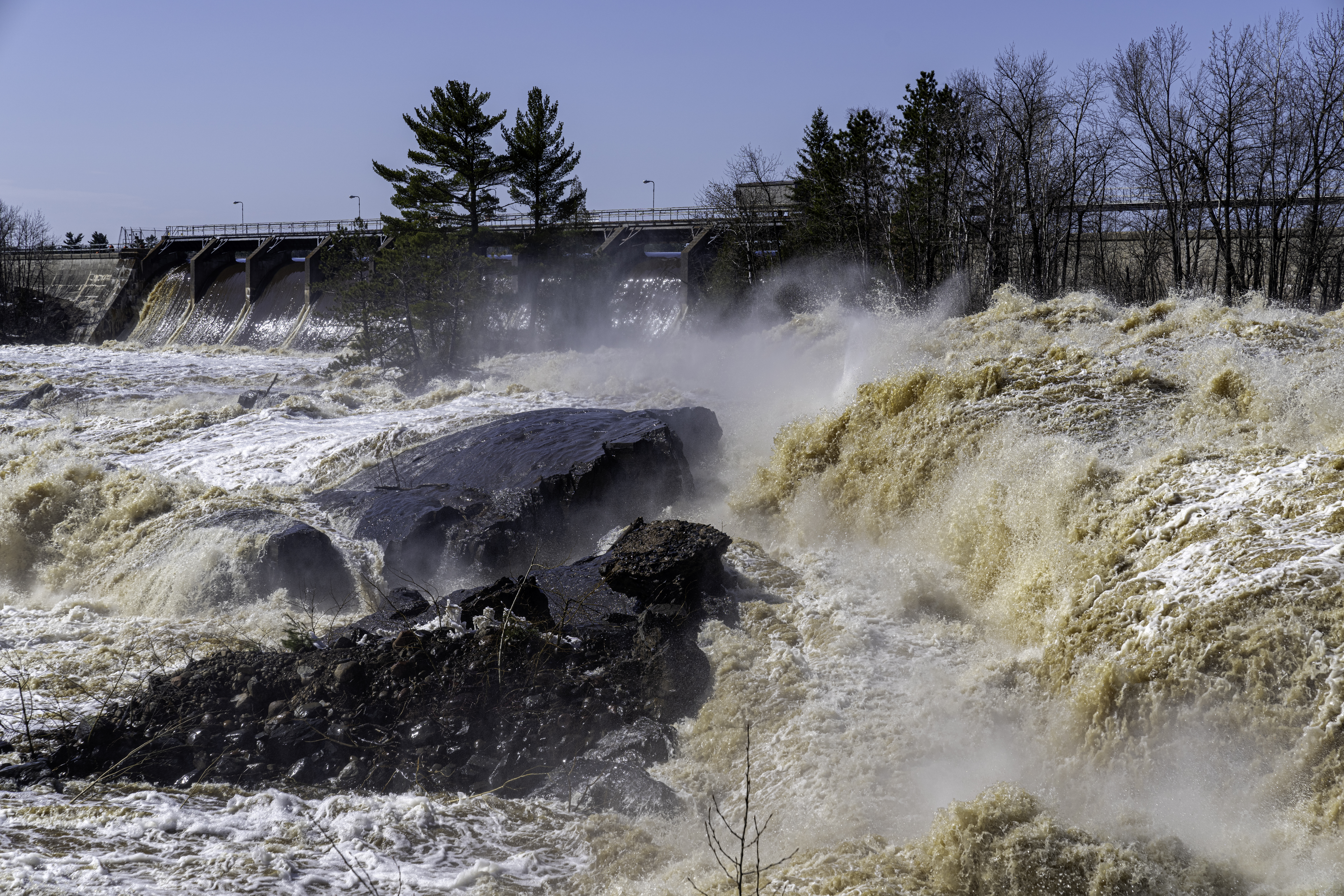
High water at the dam in 2023

Thomson Dam was completed in 1907 by Great Northern Power, an operating division of the Great Northern Railway. The generating station was expanded in 1914 with the addition of Unit 4. Unit 5 was added in 1918 and Unit 6 in 1948. Railroad tracks built into the generator floor allowed for installation and maintenance of the equipment. The complex was later transferred to the Saint Louis Power Company. Today it is owned by Minnesota Power, a division of Allete, Inc.

Heavy rains in June 2012 created an historic flood in the region which overtopped the dam, breached the forebay canal and severely damaged the hydroelectric station. Following $90 million in reconstruction and upgrades, including the addition of a new emergency spillway, the facility came back online in November, 2014. Additional upgrades will continue through 2018, including removal of the original 46kV transmission line equipment in favor of other, higher voltage equipment that was added later.

== Structures ==
The most visible part of Thomson Dam is the primary structure straddling the Saint Louis River channel near Minnesota State Highway 210. However, the Thomson Project is actually composed of multiple dams and control structures, several of which have been rebuilt and merged over the years. Today the United States Army Corps of Engineers National Inventory of Dams (NID) counts 18 structures as part of the complex, with 14 formally listed as separate.

Thomson Dam - NID Registered Structures
Dam ID	Other ID	Name	Height	Width	Type
MN00604	–	Thomson Dam	15 ft (4.6 m)	1,600 ft (490 m)	Embankment and concrete gravity
MN00604	S010	Thomson Canal Dam	45 ft (14 m)	3,500 ft (1,100 m)	Embankment
MN83020	S011	Thomson Dam #1-1/2	10 ft (3.0 m)	90 ft (27 m)	Embankment
MN83021	S001	Thomson Dam #2A, 2B	23 ft (7.0 m)	530 ft (160 m)	na
MN83022	S012	Thomson Dam #2-1/2	9 ft (2.7 m)	130 ft (40 m)	Concrete gravity
MN83023	S002	Thomson Dam #3 (Nos 2-3/4, 3, 3A, 4, 4A)	38 ft (12 m)	1,322 ft (403 m)	Concrete gravity
MN83024	S003	Thomson Dam #5	23 ft (7.0 m)	100 ft (30 m)	Concrete gravity
MN83025	S013	Thomson Dam #5-1/2	23 ft (7.0 m)	115 ft (35 m)	Concrete gravity
MN83026	S004	Thomson Dam #6	51.6 ft (15.7 m)	125 ft (38 m)	Concrete arch
MN83027	S005	Thomson Dam #8	12 ft (3.7 m)	100 ft (30 m)	na
MN83028	S006	Thomson Dam #9	11 ft (3.4 m)	100 ft (30 m)	Concrete gravity
MN83029	S007	Thomson Dam #10	11 ft (3.4 m)	80 ft (24 m)	Concrete gravity
MN83030	S008	Thomson Dam #11 (Nos. 11, 11-1/2 and Upper Gate House)	17 ft (5.2 m)	365 ft (111 m)	Concrete gravity
MN83031	S009	Thomson Dam #12	12 ft (3.7 m)	450 ft (140 m)	Embankment

== See also ==
- List of dams and reservoirs in Minnesota
