= Midway River =

- Mouth of the Midway River

Location
- Country: United States
- State: Minnesota
- Counties: Carlton County, St. Louis County

Physical characteristics
- Source
  - location: Duluth Heights
  - coordinates: 46.8054961°N 92.2115794°W
- Mouth
  - location: Cloquet
  - coordinates: 46°40′19″N 92°23′49″W
- Length: 18.8 mi-long (30.3 km)

The Midway River is an 18.8-mile-long (30.3 km) river located in southern Saint Louis County and northeast Carlton County, Minnesota, United States. It is a tributary of the Saint Louis River and flows northeast to southwest. The Midway River rises in the central part of Hermantown, then flows through Midway Township and Thomson Township, before flowing into the Saint Louis River southeast of Cloquet.

Midway River was named from the fact it lies at the midpoint between Fond du Lac and a series of falls on the St. Louis River.

== See also ==
- List of rivers of Minnesota
