= Washington Street Bridge (Brainerd, Minnesota) =

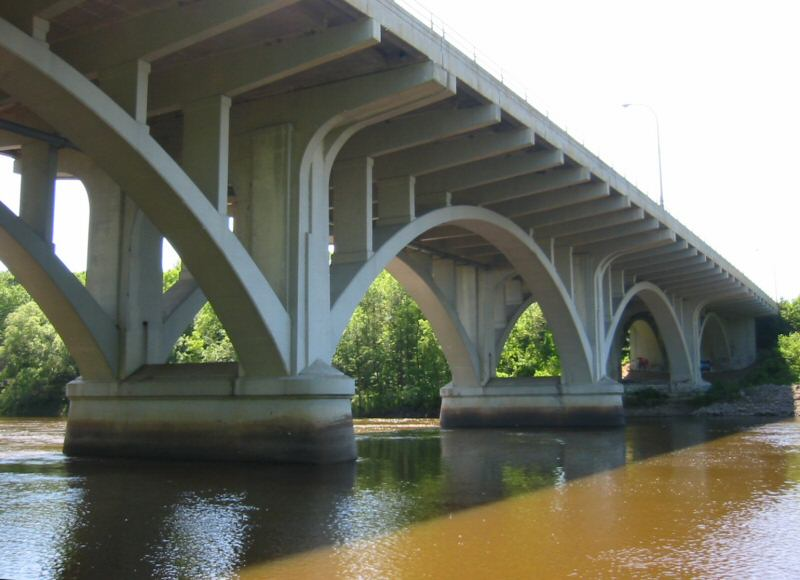
- Coordinates: 46°21′29″N 94°12′41″W
- Carries: MN 210
- Crosses: Mississippi River
- Locale: Brainerd, Minnesota
- ID number: NBI 5060

Characteristics
- Design: Concrete Deck arch bridge
- Total length: 631 feet (192 m)
- Width: 79 feet (24 m)
- Longest span: 124 feet (38 m)
- Clearance below: 43 feet (13 m)

Statistics
- Daily traffic: 26,000

The Washington Street Bridge was built 1932–1934 in Brainerd in the U.S. state of Minnesota. It carries four lanes of Minnesota State Highway 210 across the Upper Mississippi River.

== See also ==
- List of crossings of the Upper Mississippi River
