= Minnesota State Highway 210 =

State highway in Minnesota, United States

Trunk Highway 210

- MN 210 highlighted in red

Route information
- Maintained by MnDOT
- Length: 227.916 mi (366.795 km)
- Existed: July 1, 1949–present
- Tourist routes: Great River Road; Otter Trail Scenic Byway

Major junctions
- West end: ND 210 at the Red River near Breckenridge
- US 75 / MN 9 at Breckenridge; I-94 / US 52 / US 59 at Fergus Falls; US 71 at Hewitt; US 10 at Staples; US 10 / MN 64 at Motley; MN 371 at Baxter; MN 6 at Crosby; US 169 at Aitkin; MN 65 at McGregor; I-35 at Carlton
- East end: MN 23 at Duluth

Location
- Country: United States
- State: Minnesota
- Counties: Wilkin, Otter Tail, Todd, Morrison, Cass, Crow Wing, Aitkin, Carlton, St. Louis

Highway system
- Minnesota Trunk Highway System; Interstate; US; State; Legislative; Scenic
| ← MN 200 | → US 212 |

Minnesota State Highway 210 (MN 210) is a state highway in west-central, central, and northeast Minnesota, which runs from North Dakota Highway 210 (ND 210) at the North Dakota state line (at Breckenridge), and continues east to its eastern terminus at its intersection with MN 23 in Duluth near the Saint Louis River.

The route runs across Minnesota from west-central to northeast; connecting Fergus Falls, Brainerd, and Duluth. At the western terminus of MN 210, upon crossing the Red River, the roadway becomes ND 210 and feeds into ND 13. MN 210 is 228 miles (367 km) in length.

== Route description ==
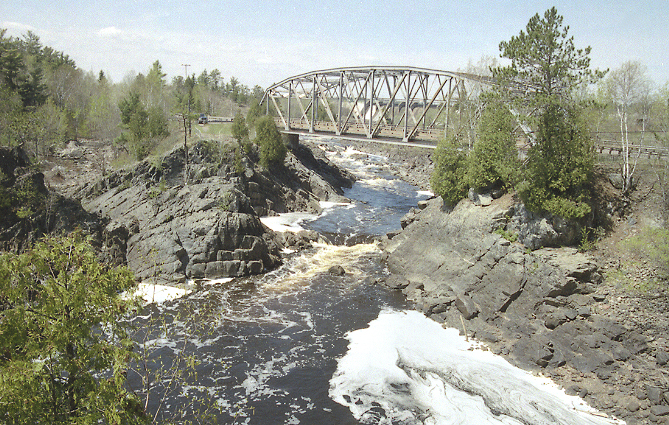
MN 210 crosses the Saint Louis River in Thomson

MN 210 serves as an east–west route in west-central, central, and northeast Minnesota between Breckenridge, Fergus Falls, Staples, Baxter, Brainerd, Carlton, and Duluth.

For part of its route (7 mi or 11 km), MN 210 is concurrent with US Highway 10 (US 10) between Motley and Staples in central Minnesota. The highway crosses the Washington Street Bridge at the Mississippi River in Brainerd and the Saint Louis River in Thomson.

The portion of MN 210 in Aitkin County is officially designated the "Dale Wayrynen Memorial Highway". This same designation is also signed on MN 210 in Carlton County from Cromwell westbound to the county line with Aitkin County.

MN 210 passes through the Cuyuna Range in Crow Wing County and the Fond du Lac State Forest in Carlton County. Cuyuna Country State Recreation Area is located on the highway in Crow Wing County near Crosby and Ironton; northeast of Brainerd. Jay Cooke State Park is located on MN 210 in Carlton County. The park is located between Carlton and Fond du Lac (Duluth).

=== Transit ===
Intercity bus service is provided along the eastern half of MN 210 from Staples to Duluth by Jefferson Lines.

== History ==
Trunk Highway 3
- Location: Breckenridge to Staples
- Existed: 1920–1955

MN 210 was authorized on July 1, 1949 between then-US 61 (now MN 45) in Carlton and MN 23 in Duluth, acting as an eastern extension of US 210. Circa 1955, the highway was expanded on the west end of US 210, replacing former MN 3 from Staples to the North Dakota state line at Breckenridge. The original eastern segment was subsequently renumbered as part of MN 39 in 1956.

When US 210 was removed in 1970, the highway was redesignated MN 210. The historic original route of MN 210 between Carlton and Duluth was changed back at this time as well.

MN 210 runs along the original mainline of the Northern Pacific Railway as built westward from Carlton to Staples. Between Henning and Breckenridge, the highway runs along a former branch line of the Northern Pacific Railway. Most of the branch line has since been abandoned.

The western section of the highway, between Breckenridge and Fergus Falls, was originally part of Minnesota Constitutional Route 3. Between Fergus Falls and Henning, the highway was part of Constitutional Route 36. The section between Carlton and Motley was part of Constitutional Route 2.

=== US 210 ===
U.S. Highway 210
- Location: Carlton–Motley
- Existed: 1926–1970

MN 210 from Carlton to Motley, the eastern portion of the present day highway, was originally part of U.S. Route 210 from 1926 to 1970. During 1970, US 210 was decommissioned from Carlton to Motley and re-designated MN 210 that same year.

US 210 was originally commissioned in 1926 by the American Association of State Highway Officials, as one of the original US Highways.

In the 1934 numbering plan, US 210 from Carlton to Motley was slated to be re-designated as U.S. Route 208. The road was almost re-numbered because of a routing change in its parent road (US 10). Ultimately, US 10 was routed along former US 10N. US 208 was shown on some maps in the mid-1930s running from Carlton to Motley, but the number was not officially commissioned or signed, and US 210 kept its number.

== Major intersections ==
| County | Location | mi | km | Destinations | Notes |
|---|---|---|---|---|---|
| Red River of the North | | 0.000 | 0.000 | ND 210 west – Wahpeton | Continuation into North Dakota |
| Wilkin | Breckenridge | 0.219 | 0.352 | US 75 north – Moorhead | Western end of US 75 concurrency |
| Wilkin | Breckenridge | 0.764 | 1.230 | US 75 south / MN 9 south – Breckenridge | Eastern end of US 75 concurrency; western end of MN 9 concurrency |
| Wilkin | Connelly Township | 2.241 | 3.607 | MN 9 north / CSAH 16 south – Barnesville | Eastern end of MN 9 concurrency |
| Otter Tail | Fergus Falls | 24.248 | 39.023 | I-94 west / US 59 north (US 52) – Moorhead | Western end of I-94/US 52/US 59 concurrency; MN 210 west follows exit 54 |
| Otter Tail | Fergus Falls | 24.691– 25.047 | 39.736– 40.309 | CSAH 1 – Fergus Falls, Wendell | Interchange; I-94 exit 55 |
| Otter Tail | Buse Township | 26.446 | 42.561 | I-94 east / US 59 south (US 52) / CSAH 25 south – Alexandria | Eastern end of I-94/US 52/US 59 concurrency; western end of CSAH 25 concurrency |
| Otter Tail | Fergus Falls | 27.417 | 44.123 | CSAH 25 north / Otter Trail Scenic Byway | Eastern end of CSAH 25 concurrency; western end of Otter Trail Scenic Byway concurrency |
| Otter Tail | Fergus Falls | 28.278 | 45.509 | CSAH 82 (Pebble Lake Road) / I-94 Alt. east – Elbow Lake | Formerly US 52/US 59 |
| Otter Tail | Fergus Falls | 29.066 | 46.777 | CSAH 29 / Otter Trail Scenic Byway | Eastern end of Otter Trail Scenic Byway concurrency |
| Otter Tail | Battle Lake | 45.583 | 73.359 | MN 78 / Otter Trail Scenic Byway – Battle Lake, Ashby, Glendalough State Park | Western end of Otter Trail Scenic Byway concurrency |
| Otter Tail | Vining | 54.582 | 87.841 | CSAH 40 / Otter Trail Scenic Byway | Eastern end of Otter Trail Scenic Byway concurrency |
| Otter Tail | Henning | 60.592 | 97.513 | MN 108 west (Douglas Avenue) – Henning, Ottertail, Airport | |
| Otter Tail | Inman Township | 66.412 | 106.880 | MN 29 – Wadena, Alexandria | |
| Todd | Hewitt | 77.512 | 124.743 | US 71 – Wadena, Long Prairie | |
| Todd | Staples | 93.558 | 150.567 | US 10 west – Wadena | Western end of US 10 concurrency |
| Morrison | Motley | 100.707 | 162.072 | US 10 east – Little Falls | Eastern end of US 10 concurrency |
| Cass | May Township | 101.023 | 162.581 | MN 64 north – Akeley | |
| Crow Wing | Baxter | 120.539 | 193.989 | MN 371 – Nisswa | Western end of Bus. MN 371 concurrency |
| Crow Wing | Brainerd | 122.095– 122.215 | 196.493– 196.686 | Washington Street Bridge over Mississippi River | |
| Crow Wing | Brainerd | 122.663 | 197.407 | Bus. MN 371 south (North 6th Street) / Great River Road (National Route) south | Eastern end of Bus. MN 371 concurrency; western end of Great River Road concurrency |
| Crow Wing | Brainerd | 122.967 | 197.896 | 8th Street | Former MN 18 |
| Crow Wing | Brainerd | 123.203 | 198.276 | CSAH 45 south / Inter-County C south (13th Street) | |
| Crow Wing | Brainerd | 123.879 | 199.364 | MN 25 south / CSAH 3 north / Inter-County C north / Great River Road (National Route) north – Merrifield, Crosslake, Pierz | Eastern end of Great River Road concurrency |
| Crow Wing | Crosby | 137.855 | 221.856 | MN 6 north / Great River Road (National Route) south – Emily, Remer | Western end of MN 6/Great River Road concurrency |
| Crow Wing | Deerwood | 142.248 | 228.926 | MN 6 south – Garrison | Eastern end of MN 6 concurrency |
| Aitkin | Aitkin | 152.441 | 245.330 | US 169 south / Great River Road (National Route) north (Minnesota Avenue) to MN 47 – Garrison | Eastern end of Great River Road concurrency; western end of US 169 concurrency |
| Aitkin | Morrison Township | 160.351 | 258.060 | US 169 north / CR T587 – Grand Rapids | Eastern end of US 169 concurrency |
| Aitkin | McGregor | 174.536 | 280.888 | MN 65 north – Range Cities | Western end of MN 65 concurrency |
| Aitkin | McGregor Township | 175.734 | 282.816 | MN 65 south – Mora, Rice Lake National Wildlife Refuge | Eastern end of MN 65 concurrency |
| Carlton | Cromwell | 196.233 | 315.806 | MN 73 – Floodwood, Moose Lake | |
| Carlton | Twin Lakes Township | 215.986– 216.107 | 347.596– 347.791 | I-35 – Duluth, St. Paul, Minneapolis | I-35 exit 235 |
| Carlton | Twin Lakes Township | 216.253 | 348.025 | CSAH 61 south / Old US 61 – Atkinson | Western end of CSAH 61 concurrency |
| Carlton | Carlton | 218.558 | 351.735 | MN 45 / CSAH 61 north / CSAH 1 south / Old US 61 – Scanlon, Wrenshall | Western end of CSAH 1 concurrency; eastern end of CSAH 61 concurrency |
| Carlton | Thomson | 219.846 | 353.808 | CSAH 1 north (Dalles Avenue) | Eastern end of CSAH 1 concurrency |
| St. Louis | Duluth | 227.790 | 366.592 | MN 23 – Duluth, Sandstone | |
1.000 mi = 1.609 km; 1.000 km = 0.621 mi: Concurrency terminus
