= Esko, Minnesota =

Census-designated place in Minnesota, US

Esko
- Census-designated place (CDP) and Unincorporated community
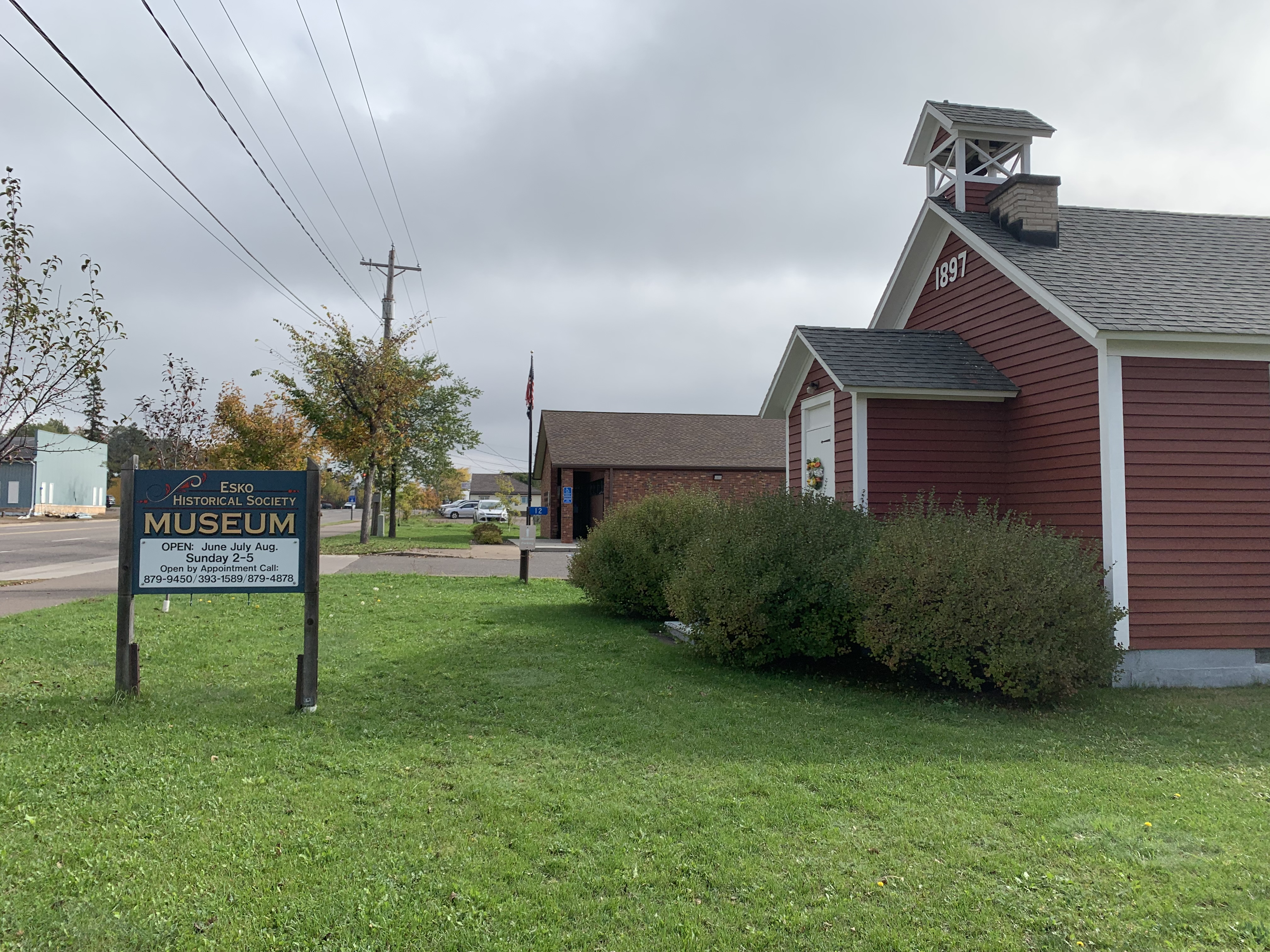
- Esko Historical Society

- Location within Minnesota
- Coordinates: 46°42′21″N 92°21′48″W
- Country: United States
- State: Minnesota
- County: Carlton County
- Township: Thomson Township

Area
  - Total: 4.86 sq mi (12.59 km^{2})
  - Land: 4.86 sq mi (12.59 km^{2})
  - Water: 0 sq mi (0.00 km^{2})
- Elevation: 1,168 ft (356 m)

Population (2020)
  - Total: 2,082
  - Density: 428.3/sq mi (165.38/km^{2})
- ZIP code: 55733
- Area code: 218
- GNIS feature ID: 643411

Esko is an unincorporated community and census-designated place (CDP) in Thomson Township, Carlton County, Minnesota, United States. As of the 2020 census, its population was 2,082.

Esko is between Cloquet and Duluth at the junction of Interstate 35 and County Road 1 (Thomson Road). It is six miles east of Cloquet and 16 miles southwest of Duluth.

Carlton County Road 61 serves as a main route in the community.

Most Esko residents are descendants of Finnish, Norwegian, and Swedish immigrants who settled the area in the early 20th century. The nearby community of Thomson also has a large Scandinavian presence.

== Demographics ==
Historical population
Census	Pop.	Note	%±
2020	2,082		—
U.S. Decennial Census

=== 2020 census ===
As of the 2020 census, Esko had a population of 2,082. The median age was 40.8 years. 26.8% of residents were under the age of 18 and 16.3% of residents were 65 years of age or older. For every 100 females there were 98.9 males, and for every 100 females age 18 and over there were 91.5 males age 18 and over.

66.9% of residents lived in urban areas, while 33.1% lived in rural areas.

There were 721 households in Esko, of which 33.7% had children under the age of 18 living in them. Of all households, 70.7% were married-couple households, 11.1% were households with a male householder and no spouse or partner present, and 15.0% were households with a female householder and no spouse or partner present. About 15.0% of all households were made up of individuals and 6.4% had someone living alone who was 65 years of age or older.

There were 747 housing units, of which 3.5% were vacant. The homeowner vacancy rate was 0.7% and the rental vacancy rate was 0.0%.

Racial composition as of the 2020 census
Race	Number	Percent
White	1,944	93.4%
Black or African American	6	0.3%
American Indian and Alaska Native	33	1.6%
Asian	5	0.2%
Native Hawaiian and Other Pacific Islander	1	0.0%
Some other race	6	0.3%
Two or more races	87	4.2%
Hispanic or Latino (of any race)	18	0.9%

== History ==
Esko was settled by immigrants between the 1870s and early 1900s. Most of the settlers were Finnish and their culture is reflected in the community's traditions. In 1919, a small store was built at the corner of what is now Thomson Road and Highway 61 by a man named Alex Esko. It became known as "Esko's Corner". The Lincoln School was built nearby in 1920 and residents began to move into the area. The name was shortened to "Esko" in 1935.

In 1961, President of Finland Urho Kekkonen visited Esko.

The book Esko's Corner, published by the Esko Historical Society, gives a detailed account of Esko's history. The Historical Society also runs a small museum in the heart of the community.
