= Thomson, Minnesota =

Former city in Minnesota, United States

Thomson
- Former city
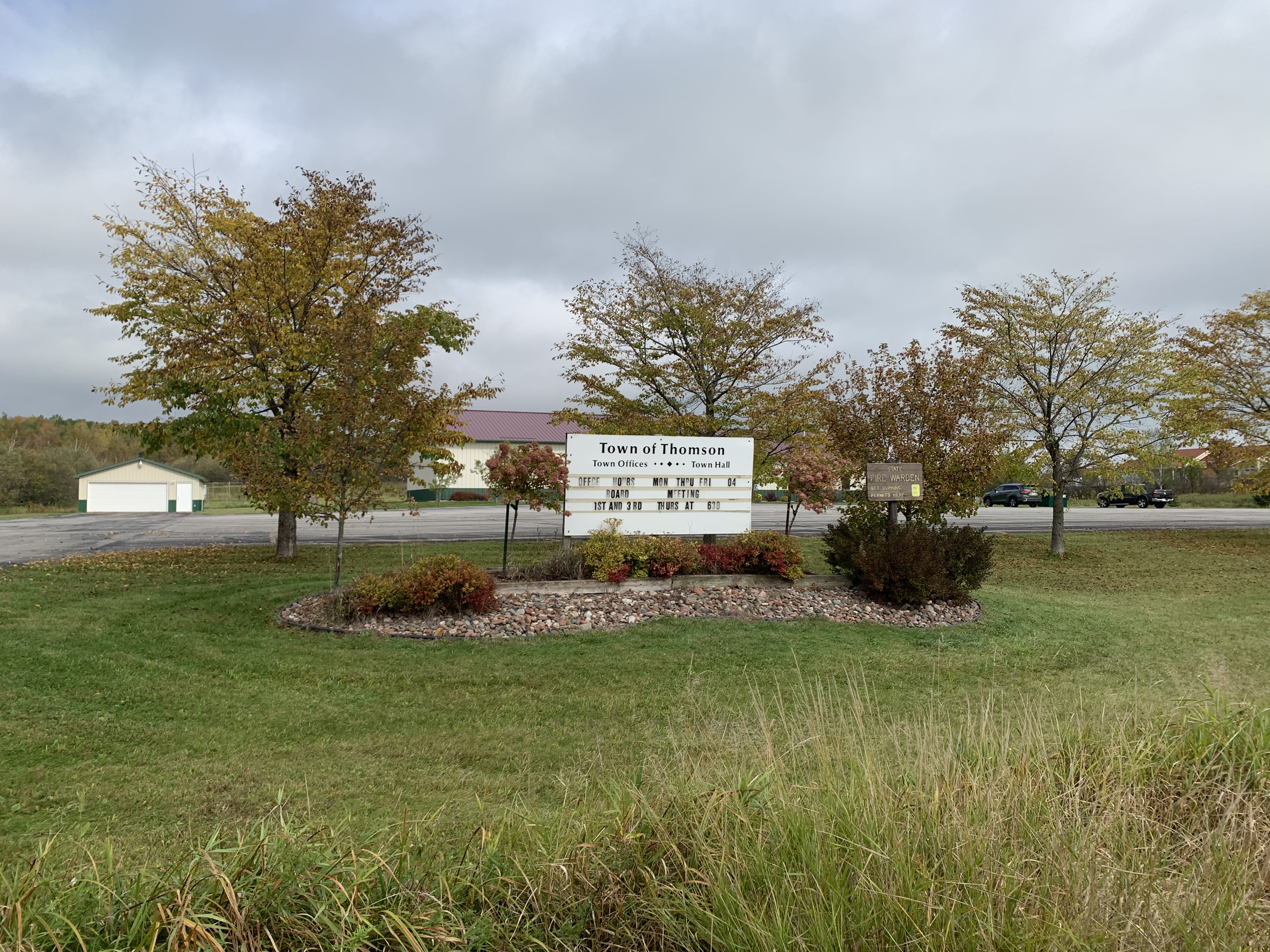
- Town of Thomson sign

- Location of the city of Thomson within Carlton County, Minnesota
- Coordinates: 46°39′55″N 92°23′44″W
- Country: United States
- State: Minnesota
- County: Carlton

Area
  - Total: 2.23 sq mi (5.78 km^{2})
  - Land: 1.87 sq mi (4.84 km^{2})
  - Water: 0.36 sq mi (0.93 km^{2})
- Elevation: 1,053 ft (321 m)

Population (2010)
  - Total: 159
  - Estimate (2012): 158
  - Density: 85/sq mi (32.8/km^{2})
- Time zone: UTC-6 (Central (CST))
  - Summer (DST): UTC-5 (CDT)
- FIPS code: 27-64750
- GNIS feature ID: 0653168

Thomson was a city in Carlton County, Minnesota, United States, located along the Saint Louis River. The population was 159 at the 2010 census.

In 2013, voters approved the consolidation of Thomson into the nearby city of Carlton, and Thomson ceased to exist as its own city in 2015.

Thomson is adjacent to Jay Cooke State Park and is located on the Willard Munger State Trail.

Minnesota Highway 210 and Dalles Avenue are two of the main routes in the community.

Thomson is located seven miles southeast of the city of Cloquet, and 18 miles southwest of the city of Duluth.

== History ==
Thomson was founded in 1870, and named for David Thompson, a Canadian explorer and surveyor. A post office was established at Thomson in 1870, and remained in operation until it was discontinued in 1955.

On November 5, 2013, a referendum was held to authorize the consolidation of Thomson and the nearby city of Carlton, which is also the county seat. 94% of voters in Carlton and 82% of Thomson voters approved, and the cities merged in 2015, retaining the name of Carlton.

== Geography ==
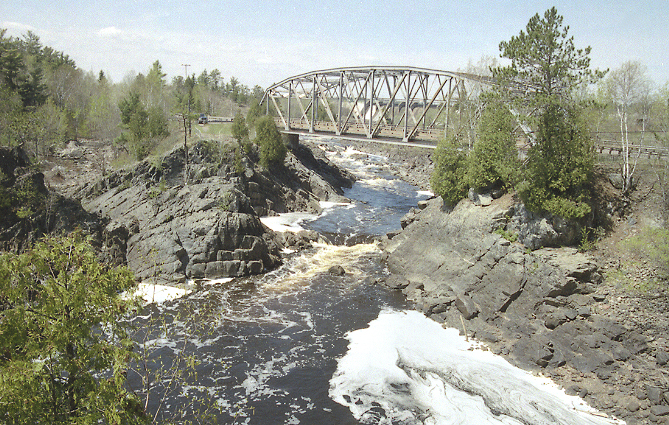
The Saint Louis River in Thomson

According to the United States Census Bureau, the city has a total area of 2.23 square miles (5.78 km^{2}), of which 1.87 square miles (4.84 km^{2}) is land and 0.36 square miles (0.93 km^{2}) is water.

== Demographics ==
Historical population
Census	Pop.	Note	%±
1900	207		—
1910	169		−18.4%
1920	103		−39.1%
1930	76		−26.2%
1940	104		36.8%
1950	170		63.5%
1960	179		5.3%
1970	159		−11.2%
1980	152		−4.4%
1990	132		−13.2%
2000	153		15.9%
2010	159		3.9%
2014 (est.)	158		−0.6%
U.S. Decennial Census

=== 2010 census ===
As of the census of 2010, there were 159 people, 73 households, and 48 families living in the city. The population density was 85.0 inhabitants per square mile (32.8/km^{2}). There were 76 housing units at an average density of 40.6 per square mile (15.7/km^{2}). The racial makeup of the city was 96.9% White, 1.3% Native American, 0.6% Asian, 0.6% from other races, and 0.6% from two or more races.

There were 73 households, of which 21.9% had children under the age of 18 living with them, 60.3% were married couples living together, 1.4% had a female householder with no husband present, 4.1% had a male householder with no wife present, and 34.2% were non-families. 28.8% of all households were made up of individuals, and 8.2% had someone living alone who was 65 years of age or older. The average household size was 2.18 and the average family size was 2.69.

The median age in the city was 48.2 years. 17% of residents were under the age of 18; 4.4% were between the ages of 18 and 24; 23.9% were from 25 to 44; 35.9% were from 45 to 64; and 18.9% were 65 years of age or older. The gender makeup of the city was 48.4% male and 51.6% female.

=== 2000 census ===
As of the census of 2000, there were 153 people, 64 households, and 44 families living in the city. The population density was 81.3 inhabitants per square mile (31.4/km^{2}). There were 67 housing units at an average density of 35.6 per square mile (13.7/km^{2}). The racial makeup of the city was 97.39% White, 0.65% Native American, and 1.96% from two or more races. 21.9% were of Irish, 20.2% Finnish, 15.8% Norwegian, 14.0% German, 8.8% Polish and 7.0% Swedish ancestry.

There were 64 households, out of which 25.0% had children under the age of 18 living with them, 62.5% were married couples living together, 6.3% had a female householder with no husband present, and 29.7% were non-families. 26.6% of all households were made up of individuals, and 10.9% had someone living alone who was 65 years of age or older. The average household size was 2.39 and the average family size was 2.89.

In the city, the population was spread out, with 18.3% under the age of 18, 9.2% from 18 to 24, 28.1% from 25 to 44, 31.4% from 45 to 64, and 13.1% who were 65 years of age or older. The median age was 41 years. For every 100 females, there were 109.6 males. For every 100 females age 18 and over, there were 123.2 males.

The median income for a household in the city was $48,438, and the median income for a family was $65,833. Males had a median income of $48,750 versus $31,250 for females. The per capita income for the city was $24,290. About 4.8% of families and 5.7% of the population were below the poverty line, including none of those under the age of eighteen and 22.2% of those 65 or over.

== See also ==
- Minnesota Highway 210
