= National Register of Historic Places listings in Carlton County, Minnesota =

Location of Carlton County in Minnesota

This is a list of the National Register of Historic Places listings in Carlton County, Minnesota. It is intended to be a complete list of the properties and districts on the National Register of Historic Places in Carlton County, Minnesota, United States. The locations of National Register properties and districts for which the latitude and longitude coordinates are included below, may be seen in an online map.

There are 15 properties and districts listed on the National Register in the county. A supplementary list includes one additional site that was formerly listed on the National Register.

This National Park Service list is complete through NPS recent listings posted May 22, 2026.

== Current listings ==
	Name on the Register	Image	Date listed	Location	City or town	Description
1	Carlton County Courthouse	Carlton County Courthouse	August 29, 1985 (#85001926)	301 Walnut Ave. 46°39′54″N 92°25′28″W	Carlton	County courthouse built 1922–24, one of Carlton County's most prominent public buildings, the longstanding seat of its government, and a work of notable Duluth architect Clyde Kelly.
2	Church of Sts. Joseph and Mary-Catholic	Church of Sts. Joseph and Mary-Catholic	March 29, 1984 (#84001409)	1225 Mission Rd. 46°41′03″N 92°38′12″W	Sawyer	1884 church expanded in the 1920s, one of the state's oldest Catholic churches built by an Ojibwe parish, one of the oldest churches in northern Minnesota overall, and one of Carlton County's few historic buildings to predate the 1918 Cloquet Fire.
3	Cloquet City Hall	Cloquet City Hall	September 11, 1985 (#85002312)	105 Arch St. 46°43′24″N 92°27′54″W	Cloquet	1920 city hall, a governmental source and architectural symbol of reconstruction efforts after the 1918 Cloquet Fire destroyed most of the community.
4	Cloquet High School	Cloquet High School	April 5, 2021 (#100006356)	509 Carlton Ave. 46°43′06″N 92°27′30″W	Cloquet	Cloquet's only public high school 1921–1968, with multiple additions charting the 20th century's pedagogical trends. Now the Carlton Lofts apartment building.
5	Cloquet-Northern Office Building	Cloquet-Northern Office Building	August 29, 1985 (#85001925)	207 Ave. C 46°43′21″N 92°27′53″W	Cloquet	1919 office building—Cloquet's largest from the construction boom after the 1918 fire—which housed nearly all of the lumber town's principal businesses.
6	Grand Portage of the St. Louis River	Grand Portage of the St. Louis River	May 24, 1973 (#73000966)	West of Duluth in Jay Cooke State Park off Minnesota Highway 210; 46°40′23″N 92°19′17″W	Duluth vicinity	7-mile (11 km) portage on a crucial Native American and fur trade-era route between the Great Lakes and Mississippi River basins.
7	Jay Cooke State Park CCC/Rustic Style Historic District	Jay Cooke State Park CCC/Rustic Style Historic District	June 11, 1992 (#89001665)	Off Minnesota Highway 210 east of Carlton; 46°39′15″N 92°22′17″W	Carlton vicinity	Exemplary suspension bridge built in 1934 and inn built 1940–42, associated with New Deal federal work relief, the development a major Minnesota state park, and National Park Service rustic architecture.
8	Jay Cooke State Park CCC/WPA/Rustic Style Picnic Grounds	Jay Cooke State Park CCC/WPA/Rustic Style Picnic Grounds	June 11, 1992 (#92000640)	Off Minnesota Highway 210 southeast of Forbay Lake; 46°39′20″N 92°21′08″W	Carlton vicinity	Three park facilities constructed 1934–36, associated with New Deal federal work relief, the development a major Minnesota state park, and National Park Service rustic architecture.
9	Jay Cooke State Park CCC/WPA/Rustic Style Service Yard	Jay Cooke State Park CCC/WPA/Rustic Style Service Yard	June 11, 1992 (#92000642)	Off Minnesota Highway 210 east of Forbay Lake; 46°39′40″N 92°20′50″W	Carlton vicinity	Two park buildings constructed 1934–35, associated with New Deal federal work relief, the development a major Minnesota state park, and National Park Service rustic architecture.
10	Lindholm Oil Company Service Station	Lindholm Oil Company Service Station	September 11, 1985 (#85002202)	202 Cloquet Ave. 46°43′17″N 92°27′39″W	Cloquet	World's only gas station built from a design by Frank Lloyd Wright, constructed in 1958 and an influence on subsequent Phillips 66 stations.
11	Minneapolis, St. Paul and Sault Ste. Marie Depot	Minneapolis, St. Paul and Sault Ste. Marie Depot	March 17, 1994 (#86003813)	840 Folz Blvd. 46°27′14″N 92°46′07″W	Moose Lake	1907 first-class railway station that served an important junction for passengers, grain, and iron ore, and provided emergency housing for people left homeless by the 1918 Cloquet Fire. Now houses a local history museum.
12	Northeastern Hotel	Northeastern Hotel	November 8, 1984 (#84000218)	115 St. Louis Ave. 46°43′33″N 92°27′49″W	Cloquet	1904 hotel and bar on a river island, remnant of a lumber-era saloon district and temporary site of a hospital and post office in the aftermath of the 1918 Cloquet Fire.
13	Henry C. Oldenburg House	Henry C. Oldenburg House	December 27, 2006 (#06001183)	604 Chestnut St. 46°39′49″N 92°25′06″W	Carlton	1894 house of politician and attorney Henry C. Oldenburg (1858–1926), an influential local figure in Carlton County's development and the emerging conservation movement.
14	Park Place Historic District	Park Place Historic District	August 29, 1985 (#85001924)	1, 512, 520, and 528 Park Pl. 46°43′16″N 92°28′08″W	Cloquet	Four large houses built by Weyerhaeuser for its executives in 1919, creating the most prestigious cluster of residences in Cloquet.
15	Shaw Memorial Library	Shaw Memorial Library	August 29, 1985 (#85001927)	406 Cloquet Ave. 46°43′17″N 92°27′32″W	Cloquet	For many years the county's only public library, built in 1920. Also noted as a work of Duluth architects Kelly & Shefchik and a public building erected after the 1918 Cloquet Fire. Now houses the Carlton County Historical Society.

== Former listings ==
	Name on the Register	Image	Date listed	Date removed	Location	City or town	Description
1	Kalevala Finnish Evangelical National Lutheran Church	Kalevala Finnish Evangelical National Lutheran Church	October 1, 1998 (#98001218)	August 16, 2006	Minnesota Highway 73 (original address); Current coordinates are 46°32′08″N 92°54′24″W	Kalevala Township	1915 frame church. Moved in 2003.

== See also ==
- List of National Historic Landmarks in Minnesota
- National Register of Historic Places listings in Minnesota
