= Carlton County History and Heritage Center =

Museum in Cloquet, Minnesota

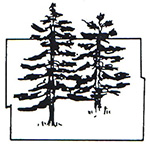

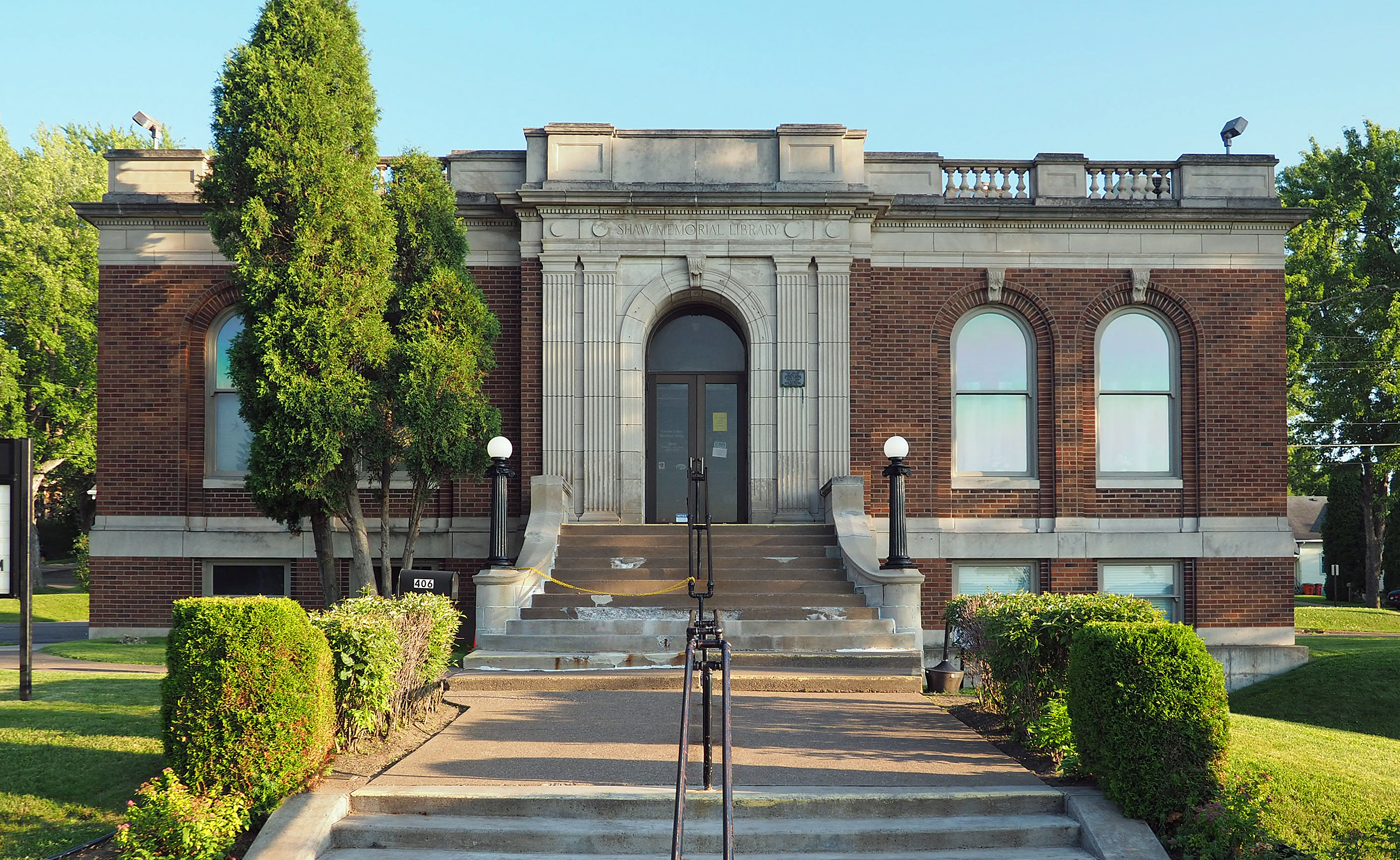
- Exterior of the museum
- Established: 1949
- Location: 406 Cloquet Avenue, Cloquet, Minnesota United States
- Type: Local history
- Executive director: Carol Klitzke
- Website: carltoncountyhistory.org

- Shaw Memorial Library
- U.S. National Register of Historic Places
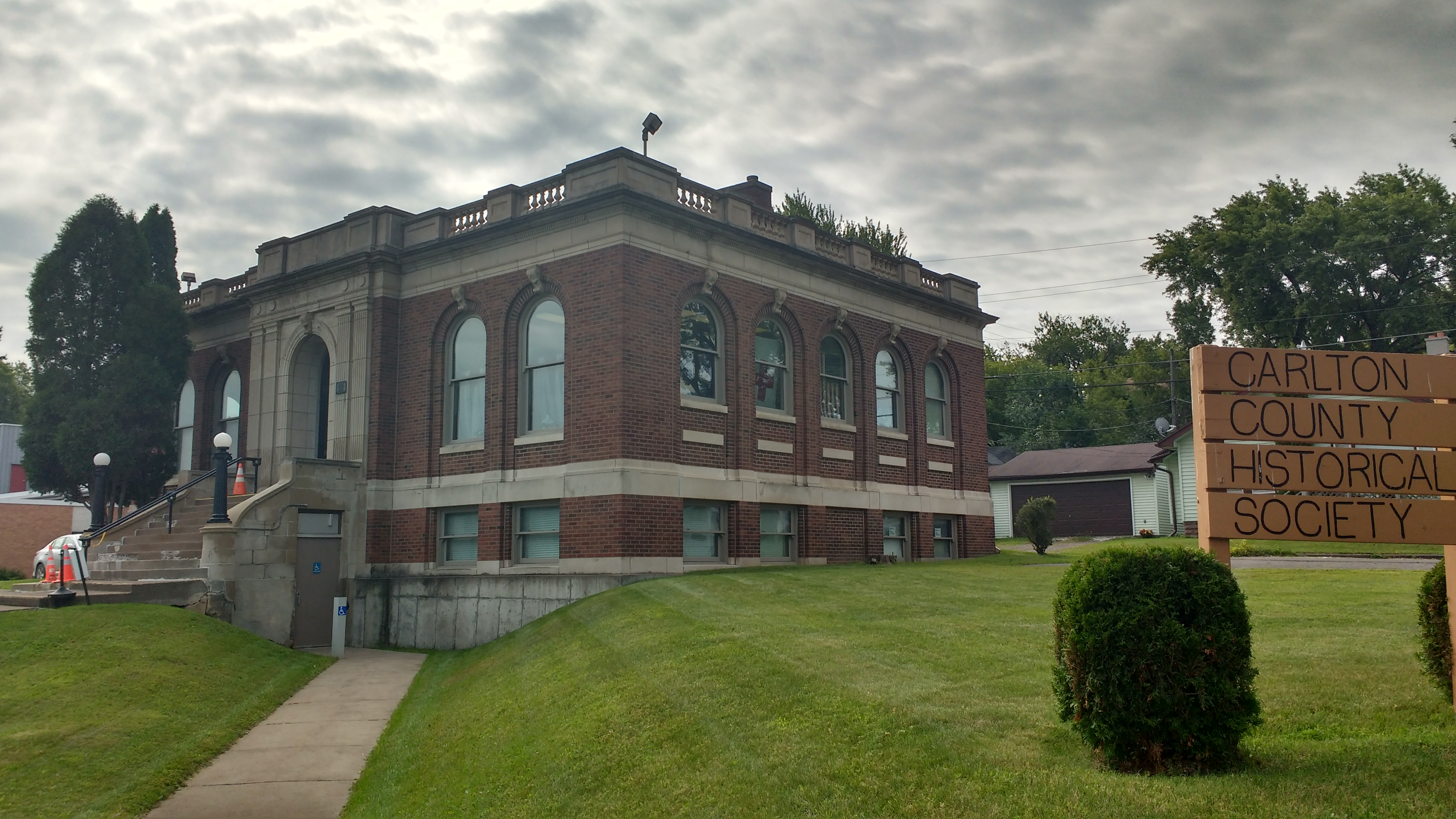

- Location within Minnesota Location within the United States
- Location: 2 North Broadway Street, New Ulm, Minnesota 56073 United States
- Area: Less than one acre
- Built: 1919-1920
- Architect: Kelly and Shefchik
- NRHP reference No.: 85001927
- Added to NRHP: August 29, 1985

The Carlton County History and Heritage Center is a museum located in Cloquet, Minnesota. The building, located in former historic Shaw Memorial Library, is owned and operated by the Carlton County Historical Society. The museum is dedicated to preserving and displaying the history of Carlton County. The Society has collected and preserved the history of Carlton County since 1949 and has operated out of the building since 1987.

On March 28, 2019, Carlton County transferred the deed for the museum building to the Carlton County Historical Society. Back in the 1980s, the city of Cloquet had sold the building to the county for $1. The County Board of Commissioners voted to transfer the deed to the Society for the same nominal amount.

Four rotating exhibits are on display each year, with two permanent exhibits focusing on the fires of 1918 and the lumber industries.

== Shaw Memorial Library ==
The Shaw Memorial Library, later known as the Cloquet Public Library, served the community of Cloquet as the only public library building in Carlton County since its construction in 1920 until 1987, when library moved to a new location. Architecturally the building is important as an accomplished design by the Duluth architectural firm of Kelly and Shefchik, and as one of the group of permanent public buildings constructed after the fire of October 12, 1918 destroyed the city of Cloquet along with a majority of Carlton County and southern St. Louis County. The building was listed on the National Register of Historic Places on 1985.

=== Building description ===
The one-story square brick building is adorned with white Bedford stone, showcasing a blend of architectural elements. An elevated basement, separated by a stone watertable, adds to its grandeur. Arched windows with brick surrounds, decorative keystones, and stone sills grace the facade, while a balustrade crowns the flat roof. The arched stone entrance, flanked by Doric pilasters, leads to the Shaw Memorial Library, its name etched in stone. Originally designed with separate areas for children's and adult reading rooms, reference areas, and lecture rooms, the structure embodies the Renaissance Revival style. The basement also housed meeting spaces, a kitchen, and a packing room.

== gallery ==
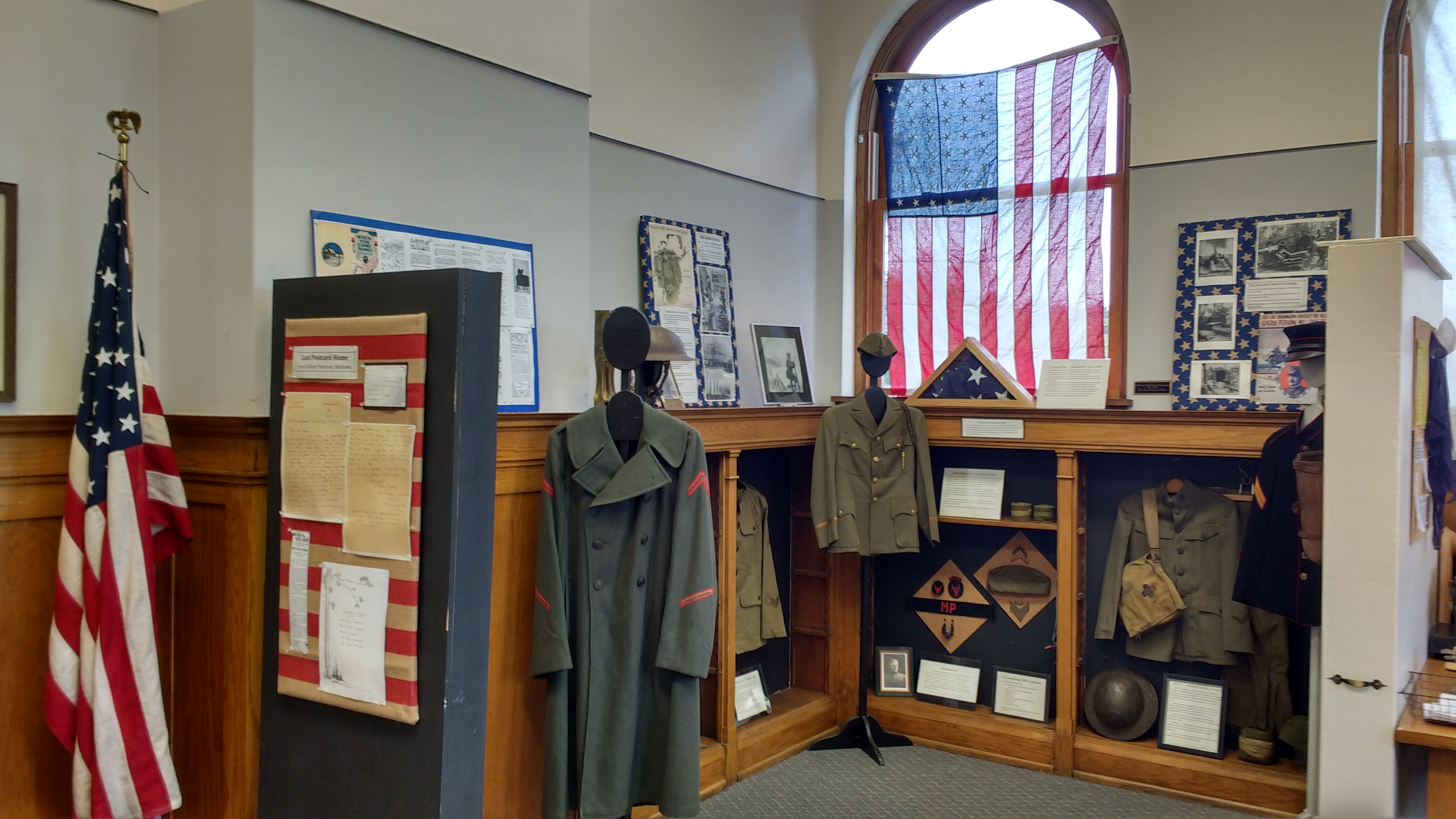
Interior of museum

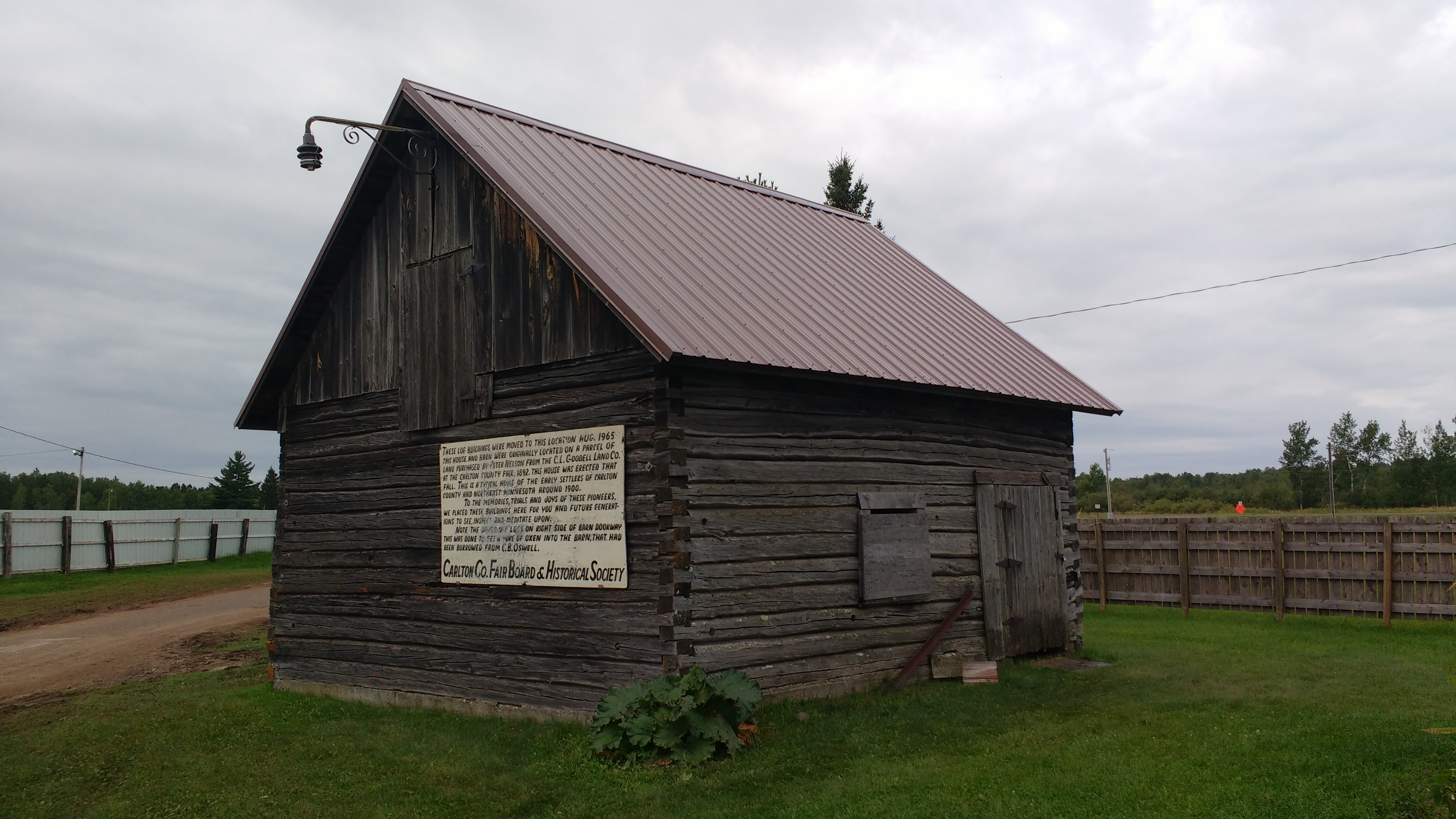
Peter Nelson Log House

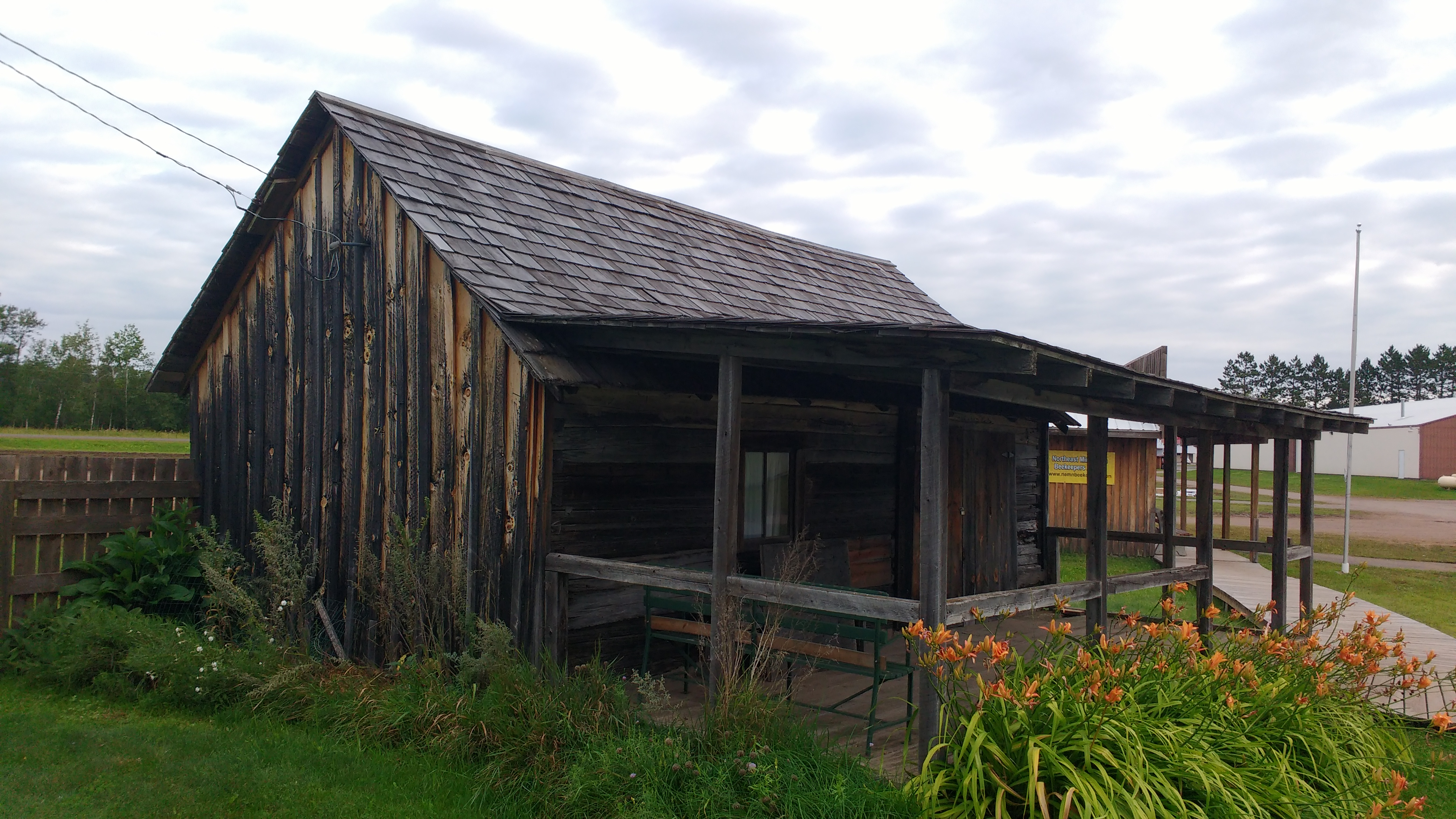
Peter Nelson Log Barn

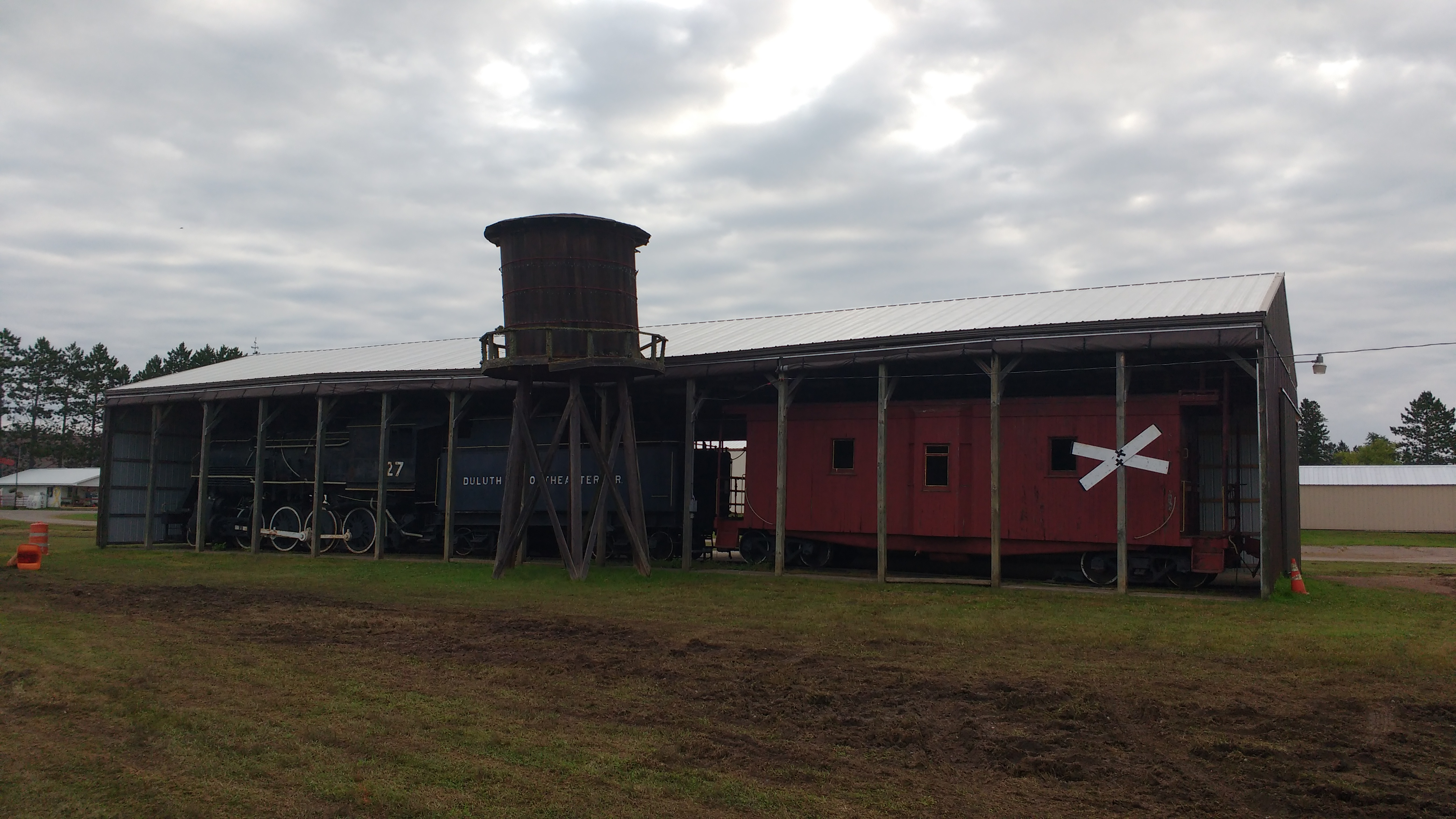
Tractor and Train Building

== See also ==
- National Register of Historic Places listings in Carlton County, Minnesota
- List of museums in Minnesota
