= Cloquet-Northern Office Building =

- U.S. National Register of Historic Places
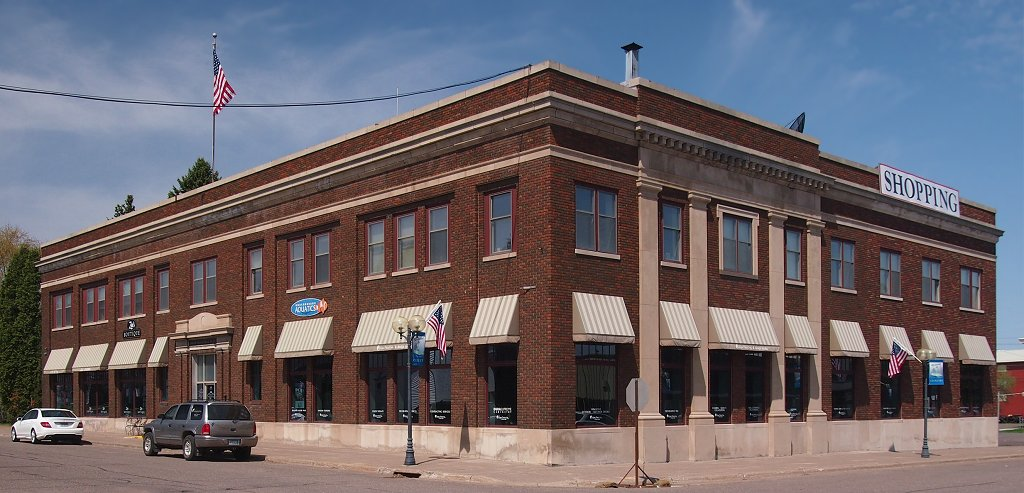

- Location within Minnesota
- Location: Ave. C and Arch St., Cloquet, Minnesota
- Coordinates: 46°43′21″N 92°27′52″W
- Area: less than one acre
- Built: 1919
- NRHP reference No.: 85001925
- Added to NRHP: August 29, 1985

The Cloquet-Northern Office Building is the historic headquarters for several offices in Cloquet, Minnesota, owned by the Weyerhaeuser family. The building was constructed in the early spring and summer of 1919, after the Cloquet fire on October 12, 1918, that caused extensive destruction in Carlton and St. Louis counties. The building housed the Cloquet Lumber Company, the Northern Lumber Company, the Northwest Paper Company, the St. Louis River Mercantile Company, the Duluth and Northeastern Railroad, the Cloquet Tie and Post Company, and the Knife Falls Boom Company. The building was listed on the National Register of Historic Places in 1985.
