= Broadacre City =

Development proposed by Frank Lloyd Wright

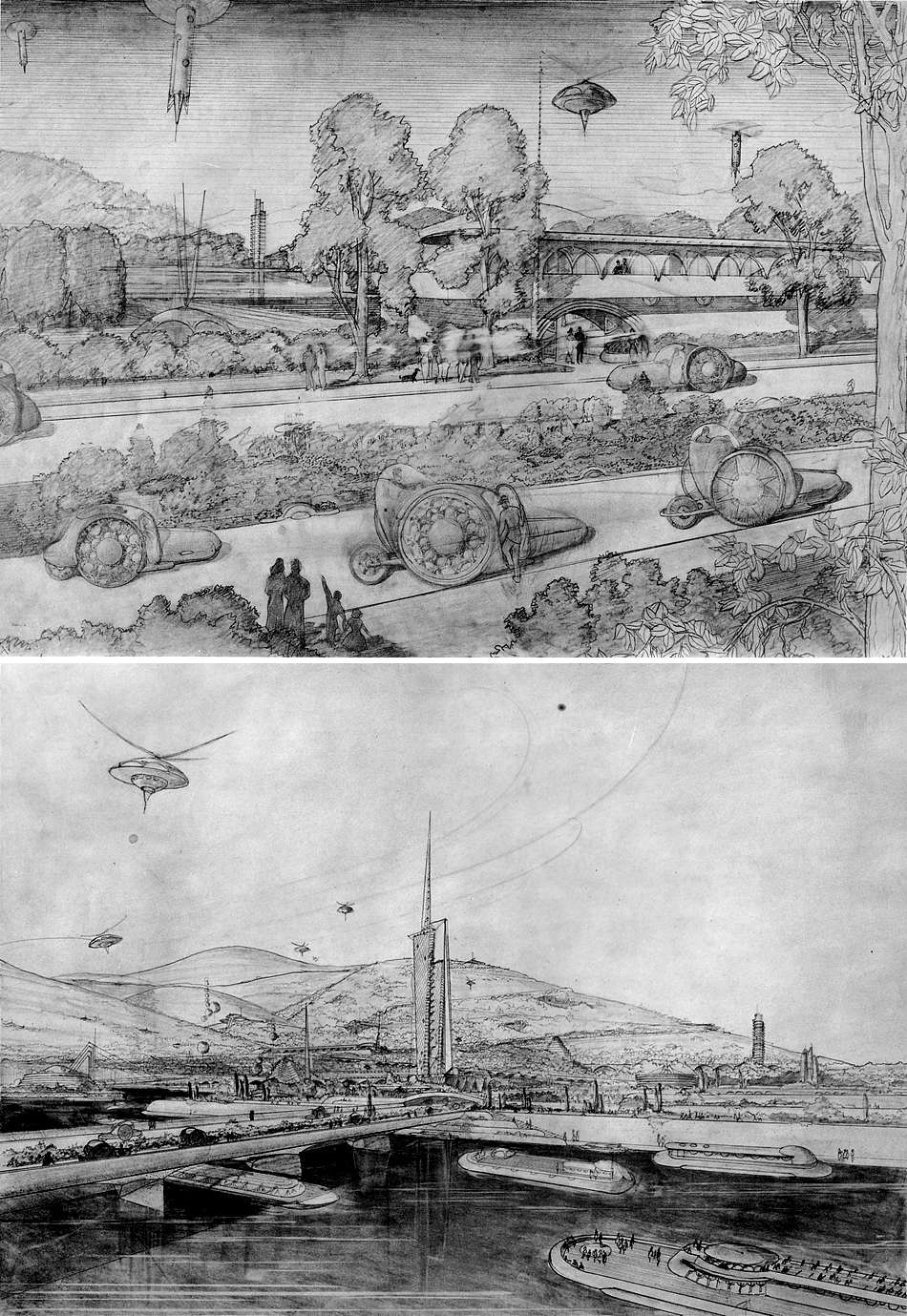
Sketches for the Broadacre City project by Frank Lloyd Wright

Broadacre City was an urban or suburban development concept proposed by Frank Lloyd Wright throughout most of his lifetime. He presented the idea in his book The Disappearing City in 1932. A few years later he unveiled a very detailed twelve-by-twelve-foot (3.7 × 3.7 m) scale model representing a hypothetical four-square-mile (10 km^{2}) community. The model was crafted by the student interns who worked for him at Taliesin, and financed by Edgar Kaufmann. It was initially displayed at an Industrial Arts Exposition in the Forum at the Rockefeller Center starting on April 15, 1935. After the New York exposition, Kaufmann arranged to have the model displayed in Pittsburgh at an exposition titled "New Homes for Old", sponsored by the Federal Housing Administration. The exposition opened on June 18 on the 11th floor of Kaufmann's store. The model is now on display at the Museum of Modern Art. Wright went on to refine the concept in later books and in articles until his death in 1959.

== Urban planning ==
Broadacre City was the antithesis of a city and the apotheosis of the newly born suburbia, shaped through Wright's particular vision. It was both a planning statement and a socio-political scheme, inspired by Henry George, by which each U.S. family would be given a one-acre (0.40-hectare) plot of land from the federal lands reserves, and a Wright-conceived community would be built anew from this. In a sense it was the exact opposite of transit-oriented development. There is a train station and a few office and apartment buildings in Broadacre City, but the apartment dwellers are expected to be a small minority. All important transport is done by automobile, and the pedestrian can exist safely only within the confines of the one-acre (0.40-hectare) plots where most of the population dwells.

Wright idealized land-owning small-enterprise capitalists and fantasized about nearly all urban inhabitants relocating to a Broadacre City only accessible through a highway. His hope was, that citizens would be given an acre or more of property in accordance to their "ability to use the land”. He decided that it would be best, for citizens to either work on their farms or part-time at small-scale factories.

In his book Urban Planning Theory since 1945, Nigel Taylor considers the planning methodology of this type of city to be Blueprint planning, which came under heavy criticism in the late 1950s by many critics such as Jane Jacobs, in her 1961 book The Death and Life of Great American Cities.

== Similar models ==
Some of the earlier garden city ideas of the landscape architect Frederick Law Olmsted and the urban planner Ebenezer Howard had much in common with Broadacre City, save for the absence of the automobile, born much later. More recently, the development of the edge city is like an unplanned, incomplete version of Broadacre City.

The R. W. Lindholm Service Station in Cloquet, Minnesota, shows some of Wright's ideas for Broadacre City.

== See also ==
- List of planned cities
- List of Frank Lloyd Wright works
