= Scanlon, Minnesota =

City in Minnesota, United States

Scanlon
- City
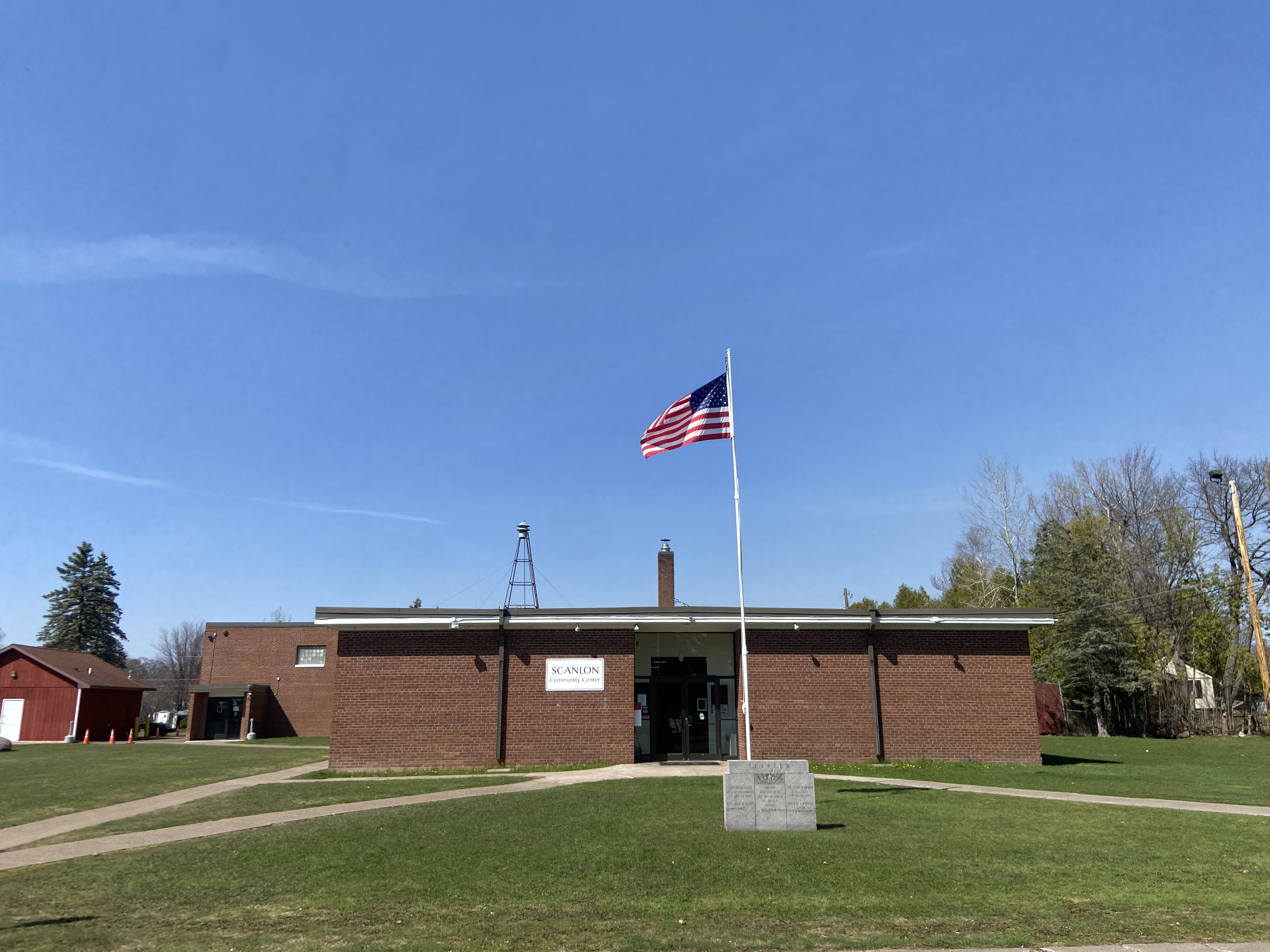
- Scanlon Community Center

- Location of the city of Scanlon within Carlton County, Minnesota
- Coordinates: 46°42′26″N 92°25′49″W
- Country: United States
- State: Minnesota
- County: Carlton
- Incorporated: December 30, 1902

Government
  - Mayor: Ron Stigers

Area
  - Total: 0.94 sq mi (2.44 km^{2})
  - Land: 0.86 sq mi (2.22 km^{2})
  - Water: 0.081 sq mi (0.21 km^{2})
- Elevation: 1,207 ft (368 m)

Population (2020)
  - Total: 987
  - Estimate (2022): 999
  - Density: 1,150.9/sq mi (444.35/km^{2})
- Time zone: UTC-6 (Central (CST))
  - Summer (DST): UTC-5 (CDT)
- ZIP code: 55720
- Area code: 218
- FIPS code: 27-58936
- GNIS feature ID: 0651273
- Website: cityofscanlon.com

Scanlon is a city in Carlton County, Minnesota, United States. The population was 987 at the 2020 census.

Interstate 35 and Carlton County Highway 45 (CR 45) are two of the main routes in Scanlon.

Other main routes include Washington Avenue (CR 16) and County Road 61 (CR 61).

Scanlon is located immediately east of the city of Cloquet; and 18 miles southwest of the city of Duluth.

== History ==
A post office called Scanlon was established in 1901, and remained in operation until it was discontinued in 1954. The city was named for Michael Joseph Scanlon, President of the Brooks-Scanlon Lumber Company.

== Geography ==
According to the United States Census Bureau, the city has a total area of 0.94 square miles (2.43 km^{2}), of which 0.86 square miles (2.23 km^{2}) is land.

The Saint Louis River flows through at the eastern edge of Scanlon.

== Demographics ==
Historical population
Census	Pop.	Note	%±
1910	572		—
1920	383		−33.0%
1930	435		13.6%
1940	460		5.7%
1950	572		24.3%
1960	1,126		96.9%
1970	1,132		0.5%
1980	1,050		−7.2%
1990	878		−16.4%
2000	838		−4.6%
2010	991		18.3%
2020	987		−0.4%
2022 (est.)	999		1.2%
U.S. Decennial Census; 2020 Census

=== 2010 census ===
As of the census of 2010, there were 991 people, 426 households, and 279 families living in the city. The population density was 1,179.8 inhabitants per square mile (455.5/km^{2}). There were 448 housing units at an average density of 533.3 per square mile (205.9/km^{2}). The racial makeup of the city was 92.1% White, 0.4% African American, 3.3% Native American, 1.1% Asian, 0.4% from other races, and 2.6% from two or more races. Hispanic or Latino of any race were 1.3% of the population.

There were 426 households, of which 29.6% had children under the age of 18 living with them, 48.6% were married couples living together, 10.3% had a female householder with no husband present, 6.6% had a male householder with no wife present, and 34.5% were non-families. 31.2% of all households were made up of individuals, and 18.6% had someone living alone who was 65 years of age or older. The average household size was 2.30 and the average family size was 2.85.

The median age in the city was 40.8 years. 22.9% of residents were under the age of 18; 8.1% were between the ages of 18 and 24; 24.9% were from 25 to 44; 22% were from 45 to 64; and 22.2% were 65 years of age or older. The gender makeup of the city was 48.7% male and 51.3% female.

=== 2000 census ===
As of the census of 2000, there were 838 people, 365 households, and 248 families living in the city. The population density was 996.8 inhabitants per square mile (384.9/km^{2}). There were 374 housing units at an average density of 444.9 per square mile (171.8/km^{2}). The racial makeup of the city was 96.42% White, 0.60% African American, 2.27% Native American, and 0.72% from two or more races. Hispanic or Latino of any race were 0.12% of the population. 17.2% were of German, 15.6% Finnish, 15.1% Norwegian, 11.1% Swedish, 6.4% Polish and 5.3% French ancestry.

There were 365 households, out of which 24.9% had children under the age of 18 living with them, 57.0% were married couples living together, 7.7% had a female householder with no husband present, and 31.8% were non-families. 26.8% of all households were made up of individuals, and 15.3% had someone living alone who was 65 years of age or older. The average household size was 2.30 and the average family size was 2.75.

In the city, the population was spread out, with 21.8% under the age of 18, 5.3% from 18 to 24, 25.7% from 25 to 44, 23.3% from 45 to 64, and 24.0% who were 65 years of age or older. The median age was 43 years. For every 100 females, there were 90.0 males. For every 100 females age 18 and over, there were 85.6 males.

The median income for a household in the city was $42,857, and the median income for a family was $46,000. Males had a median income of $36,118 versus $26,313 for females. The per capita income for the city was $19,590. About 0.8% of families and 3.9% of the population were below the poverty line, including 3.7% of those under age 18 and 3.3% of those age 65 or over.

== Politics ==
Presidential election results

Precinct General Election Results
Year	Republican	Democratic	Third parties
2024	46.5% 277	51.5% 307	2.0% 12
2020	43.5% 256	53.4% 314	3.1% 18
2016	37.6% 201	54.5% 291	7.9% 42
2012	28.9% 160	68.6% 380	2.5% 14
2008	34.4% 194	64.2% 362	1.4% 8
2004	30.7% 173	68.6% 386	0.7% 4
2000	33.3% 160	61.0% 293	5.7% 27
1996	27.4% 131	62.6% 299	10.0% 48
1992	24.6% 120	56.2% 275	19.2% 94
1988	28.8% 141	71.2% 349	0.0% 0
1984	27.4% 144	72.6% 382	0.0% 0
1980	30.0% 165	60.9% 335	9.1% 50
1976	30.4% 167	68.7% 378	0.9% 5
1968	22.4% 116	74.9% 387	2.7% 14
1964	18.6% 98	81.0% 427	0.4% 2
1960	31.6% 161	68.4% 349	0.0% 0

== Education ==
It is zoned to Cloquet Public Schools. Cloquet High School is the zoned high school.
