= Fond du Lac Ojibwe School =

Tribal school in Cloquet, Minnesota

Coordinates: 46.7108°N 92.5132°W

Fond du Lac Ojibwe School is a K–12 tribal school in Cloquet, Minnesota. The Fond du Lac Band of Lake Superior Chippewa operates the school and owns the facilities.

It is affiliated with the Bureau of Indian Education (BIE).

== History ==
In 1993 there was a campaign by parents trying to get the school to fire a White American teacher who was teaching a class on Ojibwe culture, even though she held fluency in the Ojibwe language and was married to an Ojibwe.

The 2013 the federal sequester caused the BIE to decrease the school's budget by $410,000. Like other BIE schools it relies on funding from the federal government of the United States. The school reduced its academic support programs and increased class sizes.

In an editorial, the Minneapolis Star-Tribune, citing the "modern, spacious, and well-equipped" school facility, stated that "Fond du Lac Ojibwe School is an example of what a BIE school should look like."

== See also ==
- Cloquet Public Schools
  - Cloquet High School
