= Cloquet High School =

Coordinates: 46.7097222°N 92.4413889°W

- 100 18th Street; Cloquet, Minnesota 55720-2438; United States

Information
- School district: Cloquet Public School District
- Grades: 9–12
- Enrollment: 800 (2022–2023)
- Colors: Purple and White
- Teams: Lumberjacks
- Website: https://www.isd94.org/o/chs

Cloquet High School (CHS) is a high school in Cloquet in the U.S. state of Minnesota. Operated by Cloquet Public Schools, it serves approximately 700 students in grades 9-12; a typical graduating class has 160 to 200 members. It has existed for over 100 years. The existing building was built in 1969, with the old building then being turned into a middle school. That building was built in 1921 replacing an earlier school destroyed, along with much of the town, in the 1918 Cloquet fire.

It serves almost all of Cloquet and all of Scanlon.

== Academics ==
Curriculum requirements for the four core areas are as follows: three-and-a-half years of mathematics, four years of English, four years of social studies (including geography, world events, economics, US government, world and US history courses), and three years of science. Students are required to take a year of physical education and a year of art (performance or visual). CHS offers courses in Spanish, German, and Anishinaabe. The College In The Schools (CITS) program allows students to take classes in high school, with teachers in the building, for credit through local colleges, notably Fond du Lac Tribal and Community College and the University of Minnesota Duluth. The colleges certify high school teachers and approve course curriculums, and students who take those courses receive a separate transcript from the college in addition to the normal high school transcript. Students also have the option of post secondary enrollment; for either senior or junior year (or both) they may enroll directly in a local college. They still graduate from CHS and can join sports and other extracurriculars at the high school, but attend all or part of their classes at the college.

== Athletics ==
The school contends at state level in American football, basketball, hockey, and soccer. In order to participate in athletics they need to maintain a minimum GPA and behavior code, as established by the Minnesota State High School League and CHS. Official teams are: CHS Boys' sports: Baseball, basketball, cross country running, football, golf, hockey, skiing (both alpine and cross country), soccer, tennis, track and field, and wrestling. CHS Girls' sports: Basketball, cross country running, golf, hockey, skiing (both alpine and cross country), soccer, softball, swimming, tennis, track and field, volleyball, and wrestling. Other clubs and activities: The White Pine (school yearbook), cheerleading, chess club, danceline, Destination Imagination, Future Problem Solving (FPS), Knowledge Bowl, Madrigals, Mathematics Team, Mock Trial, Pep Band, Science Fair, and various intramurals.

== Arts ==
Visual art classes are taught on drawing, painting, photography, sculpture and ceramics. There are three choirs: concert, crystal (all-women), and varsity (as well as a smaller group of madrigals who perform at sports games and other events throughout the year); a concert band, pep band, and jazz band; and an orchestra. There are also two theater performances every year, a musical in the fall and a play in the spring.
