= Gertrude Esteros =

American college professor (1914–2016)

- Esteros, in Red Cross uniform, from a 1944 publication
- Born: Kerttu Esteros; October 1, 1914; Cloquet, Minnesota, U.S.
- Died: December 2, 2016 (age 102); Saint Paul, Minnesota, U.S.
- Occupations: College professor, design scholar

Gertrude Anne Esteros (October 1, 1914 – December 2, 2016), born Kerttu Esteros, was an American college professor. From 1949 to 1979 she was head of the design department at the University of Minnesota. She was also first director of the Goldstein Gallery on campus. During World War II she worked with the American Red Cross in New Guinea and the Philippines.

== Early life and education ==
Kerttu Esteros was born in Cloquet, Minnesota, the daughter of Gust Esteros and Selma Hietala Esteros. Both of her parents were born in Finland. She was a 4-H member in her childhood, and in 1933 she attended the National 4-H Encampment in Washington, D.C., where she met Eleanor Roosevelt. She graduated from the University of Minnesota in 1936, and earned a master's degree there in 1941. She completed doctoral studies in 1957 at Teachers College, Columbia University, with a dissertation titled "Art in Education for Home and Family Living". While she was in college, she worked with mentors Wylle B. McNeal and the Goldstein sisters, Harriet and Vetta, all professors in Minnesota's home economics division.

== Career ==
Esteros taught at the University of Illinois from 1938 to 1940, and at Lindenwood College in Missouri from 1941 to 1942. She chaired the campus Peace Coordinating Committee at the University of Illinois, and was a founding member of the Champaign County ACLU in 1940. During World War II, she volunteered with the American Red Cross, and served in New Guinea and the Philippines. In 1946 she traveled to Guatemala, and in 1948, she went to Finland with the American Friends Service Committee, to work with displaced families from Karelia.

Esteros was a design professor at the University of Minnesota from 1949 to 1979, and head of the "related arts" or design department. She was a distinguished visiting professor at Penn State in 1963, and president of the American Association of Housing Educators (AAHE) from 1967 to 1968. In the 1980s she helped develop the 1666 Coffman Condominiums, a housing complex for retired professors on the university's campus. She spoke to community groups, usually about home decor.

Esteros retired from the University of Minnesota in 1980. She was founder of the Goldstein Gallery on campus, and its first director. In 1993 she was awarded the Outstanding Achievement Award by the University. On her 100th birthday the city of Falcon Heights celebrated "Gertrude Esteros Day".

== Publications ==
- "A study of juiciness and flavor of standing and rolled beef rib roasts" (1937, with Alice M. Child)
- "Developing Intercultural Understandings" (1969}

== Personal life ==
Esteros designed her own home in St. Paul, and later in life lived in the retirement community she helped to plan, and died in 2016, at the age of 102, in St. Paul. Her papers are in the University of Minnesota Archives.
