= Wylle B. McNeal =

American home economist (1885–1975)

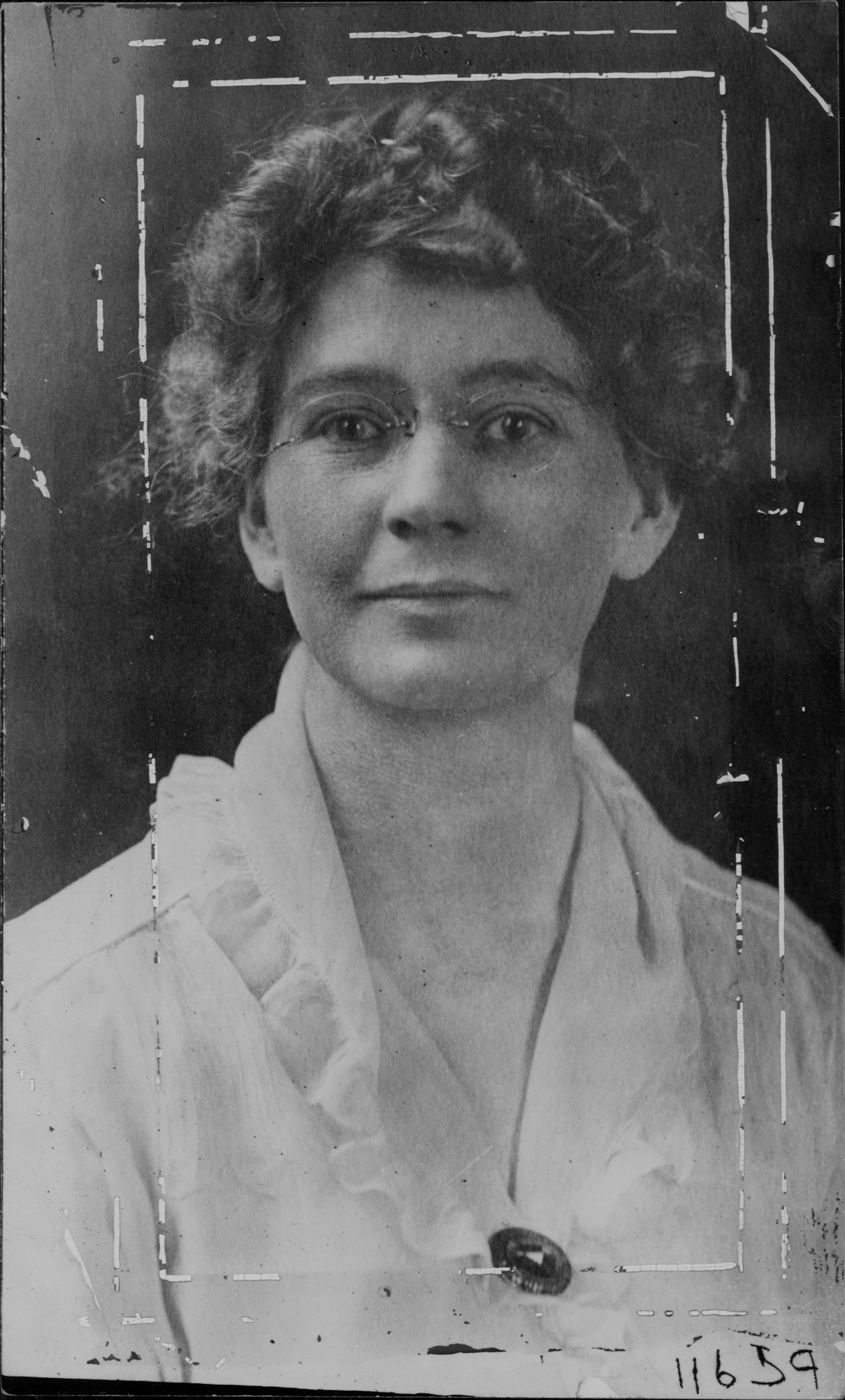
- Wylle B. McNeal, from a 1923 newspaper
- Born: May 1885; Owen County, Kentucky, U.S.
- Died: October 11, 1979 (aged 94); Florida, U.S.
- Other name: Wylie B. McNeal
- Occupations: Home economist, college professor

Wylle B. McNeal (May 1885 – October 11, 1979), also seen as Wylie B. McNeal, was an American college professor and home economist. She was head of the home economics division at the University of Minnesota from 1923 to 1950, and a vice-president of the National Society for Vocational Education. A large building on the University of Minnesota's St. Paul campus is named for McNeal.

== Early life and education ==
McNeal was born in Owen County, Kentucky, the daughter of William P. McNeal and Sallie McNeal. Her sister Nancy McNeal was also a home economics professor. She graduated from Western Kentucky State Normal School, earned a bachelor's degree at the University of Chicago in 1915, and completed a master's degree at Columbia University in 1919.

== Career ==
McNeal taught school in Kentucky and Florida as a young woman. She taught home economics at Iowa State University and Cornell University. She was state supervisor of home economics at the Minnesota Department of Education from 1919 to 1923. In 1923 she became the third chair of the home economics division at the University of Minnesota. The program and buildings of the division both expanded under her leadership. She retired in 1950. and was succeeded by Louise A. Stedman.

McNeal chaired the national convention of the American Home Economics Association in 1926. She was a vice-president of the National Society for Vocational Education. She served on the technical board of the Journal of Home Economics. In 1939, she was nominated for president of the American Home Economics Association, and spoke in favor of smaller class sizes at the annual conference, saying "We must be willing to pay the price of an enlightened citizenry." She spoke to campus, community, and professional groups about her work, and on radio, and edited a series of home economics textbooks.

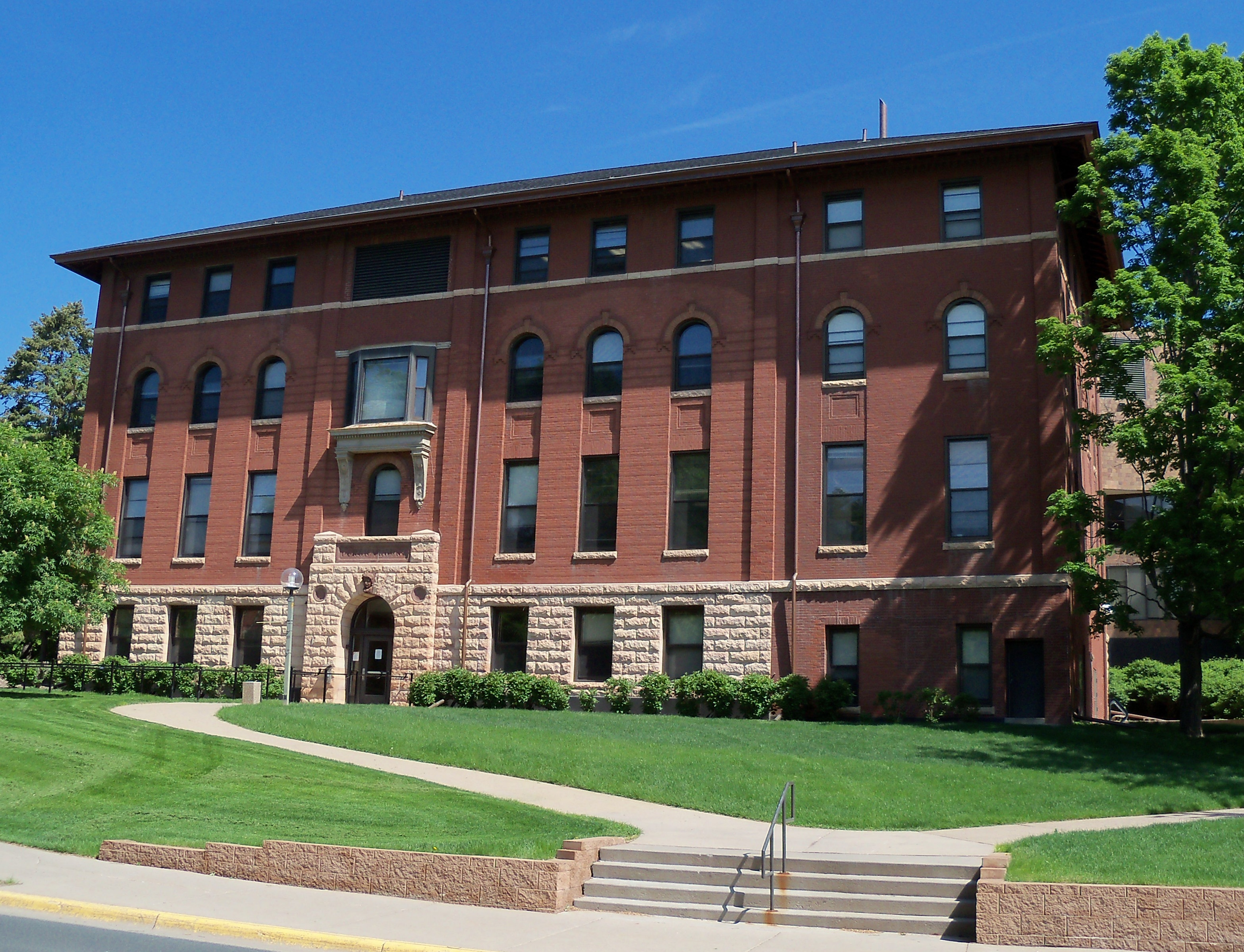
McNeal Hall on the St. Paul campus of the University of Minnesota, named for Wylle B. McNeal

In 1960, the University of Minnesota dedicated McNeal Hall, a building complex at its St. Paul campus, housing the school of home economics and the Goldstein Museum of Design. Gertrude Esteros, one of McNeal's mentees and employees at Minnesota, later became head of the design department there.

== Publications ==
- "Training Supervisors of Home Economics Education" (1930)
- "A Home-Economics Study: Scholastic Behavior of a Selected Group of Undergraduate Home Economics Students" (1934)

== Personal life ==
In retirement after 1950, McNeal lived with her widowed sister in Winter Park, Florida. Her sister died in 1970, and she died in 1979, at the age of 94, in Florida.
