= Cloquet Public Schools =

School district in Minnesota, United States

Cloquet Public Schools (ISD94) is a school district headquartered in Cloquet, Minnesota.

Ken Scarbrough served as superintendent until his retirement. Michael Cary became the superintendent in 2018. In 2020 the school district renewed his contract effective July 1 of that year, running until June 30, 2024.

It is partially in Carlton County, where it serves almost all of Cloquet, all of Scanlon, and a portion of Big Lake. It also serves sections of St. Louis County.

== Schools ==
- Cloquet High School
- Cloquet Middle School
- Churchill Elementary School
- Washington Elementary School

Garfield School in Cloquet, Minnesota approximately 1930

== See also ==
- Fond du Lac Ojibwe School - Tribal school in Cloquet
