= Roy W. Ranum =

American politician and industrialist (1898–1990)

Mayor of Cloquet
- In office 1952–1953; 1939–1943

Member of the Minnesota Senate
- In office 1943–1946

Personal details
- Born: August 11, 1898 Sparta, Wisconsin, U.S.
- Died: February 5, 1990 (aged 91) St. Louis County, Minnesota, U.S.
- Party: Republican

Roy Willard Ranum (August 11, 1898 – February 5, 1990) was an American politician and papermaker.

Ranum was born in Sparta, Wisconsin. He moved to Faribault, Minnesota in 1909 and graduated from Fairbault High School in 1918. Ranum then moved to Cloquet, Minnesota, in 1919 and worked as a papermaker for the Northwest Paper Company. He lived with his wife and children in Cloquet. Ranum served on the Cloquet Civil Service Board and on the Cloquet Park Board. He also served as Mayor of Cloquet from 1939 to 1943 and from 1952 to 1953. Ranum served in the Minnesota Senate from 1943 to 1946 as a Republican. He unsuccessfully ran for Congress to Minnesota's 8th congressional district as a Republican in 1958. He died on February 5, 1990, in St. Louis County, Minnesota.
