= R. W. Lindholm Service Station =

Gas station in Cloquet, Minnesota

- Lindholm Oil Company Service Station
- U.S. National Register of Historic Places
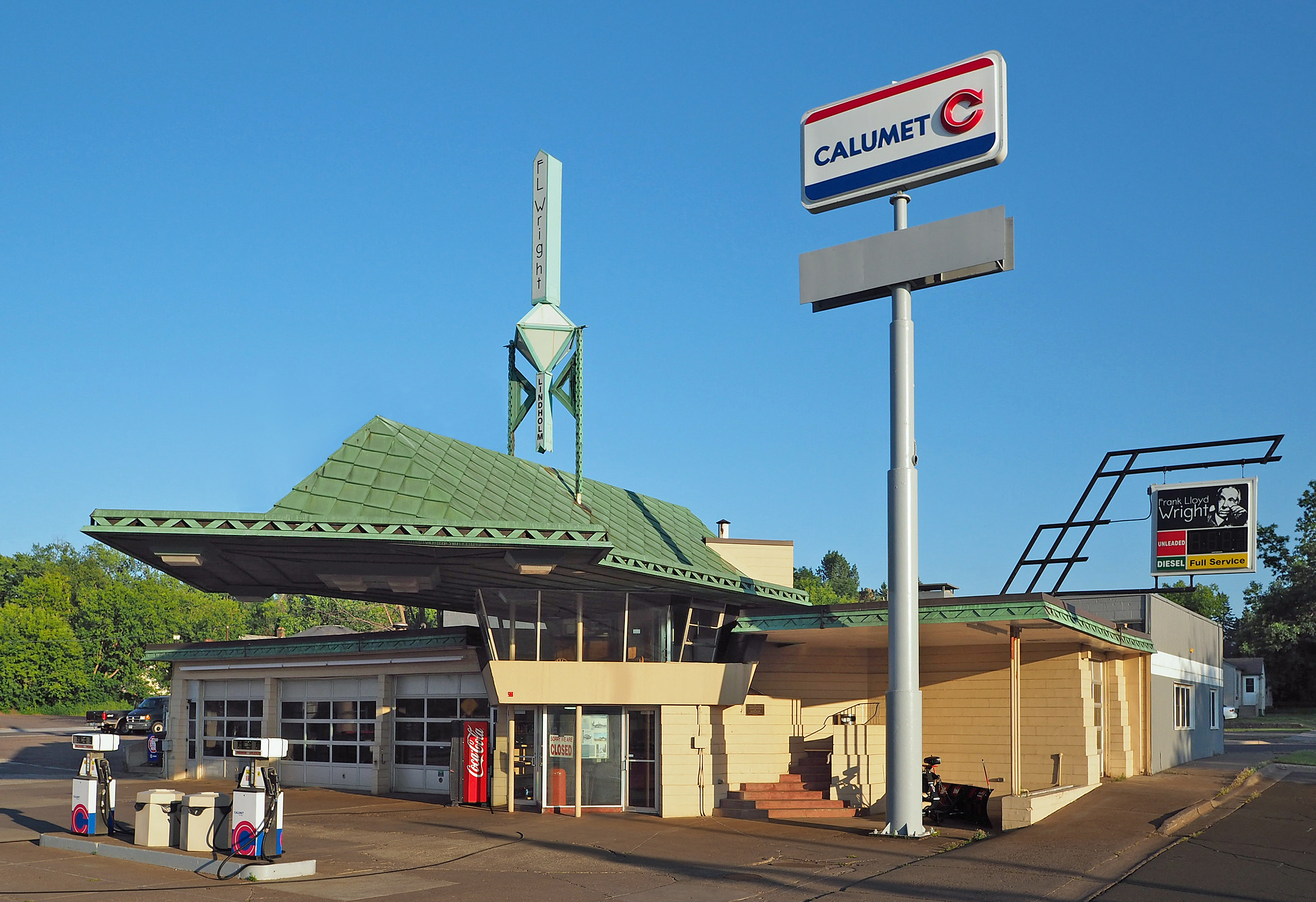
- The R. W. Lindholm Service Station, viewed from the northwest

- Location within Minnesota Location within the United States
- Location: 202 Cloquet Avenue, Cloquet, Minnesota
- Coordinates: 46°43′17″N 92°27′39″W
- Area: less than one acre
- Built: 1958
- Architect: Frank Lloyd Wright
- NRHP reference No.: 85002202
- Added to NRHP: September 11, 1985

The R. W. Lindholm Service Station is a service station designed by Frank Lloyd Wright in Cloquet, Minnesota, United States. Built in 1958 and still in use, it is the only Wright–designed gas station built during his lifetime. It was originally part of Wright's utopian Broadacre City plan and is one of the few designs from that plan that was actually implemented. The building is listed on the National Register of Historic Places.

== History ==
Wright had designed station owner Ray Lindholm's house in 1952 and, knowing Lindholm worked in the oil business, presented him with a proposal to design the gas station envisioned as part of Broadacre City. Lindholm seized the opportunity to beautify gas station design, and Wright completed his design in 1956. The station ultimately cost $20,000 – roughly four times the cost of the average filling station at the time. The station opened in 1958 under Lindholm's name; it later became a Phillips 66 station.

Its construction was only a partial success for Wright, as his vision of the gas station as a social center never took hold. However, Phillips 66 incorporated several of the gas station's design elements, particularly the triangular cantilevered canopy, in later gas stations. The station was added to the National Register of Historic Places on September 11, 1985, for its architectural significance. As of 2014, it operates under the Spur brand. In 2018, the grandchildren of Ray Lindholm sold the gas station to the developer Andrew Volna for $250,000.

== Design ==
In his original plans for Broadacre City, Wright designed his service stations to be community social centers and an integral part of his utopian ideas. His design of the Lindholm Service Station reflects these plans and represents a then-unconventional approach to filling station design. A cantilevered copper canopy extends over the gas pumps; the angular end of the canopy points to the St. Louis River, a feature Wright intended to symbolically connect river transport to the automobile. While Wright had planned to install overhead gas pumps suspended from the canopy to add space, local safety regulations compelled him to install conventional ground-based pumps. Beneath the canopy is an observation lounge with glass walls, originally intended to be the social center envisioned in the Broadacre City plans. The station's service bays are built from stepped cement blocks; the stepping, as well as the recessed mortar between the rows of blocks, provides a horizontal element to the building. Skylights allow sunlight into the service bays.

Despite the importance of gas stations to the Broadacre City concept, the structure was the only Wright–designed service station built in his lifetime. Another service station designed by Wright is part of the Pierce-Arrow Museum in Buffalo, New York; while he designed the station in 1927, it was not built until 2013.

== See also ==
- List of Frank Lloyd Wright works
- National Register of Historic Places listings in Carlton County, Minnesota
