= Cloquet City Hall =

Historic building in Minnesota, United States

- U.S. National Register of Historic Places
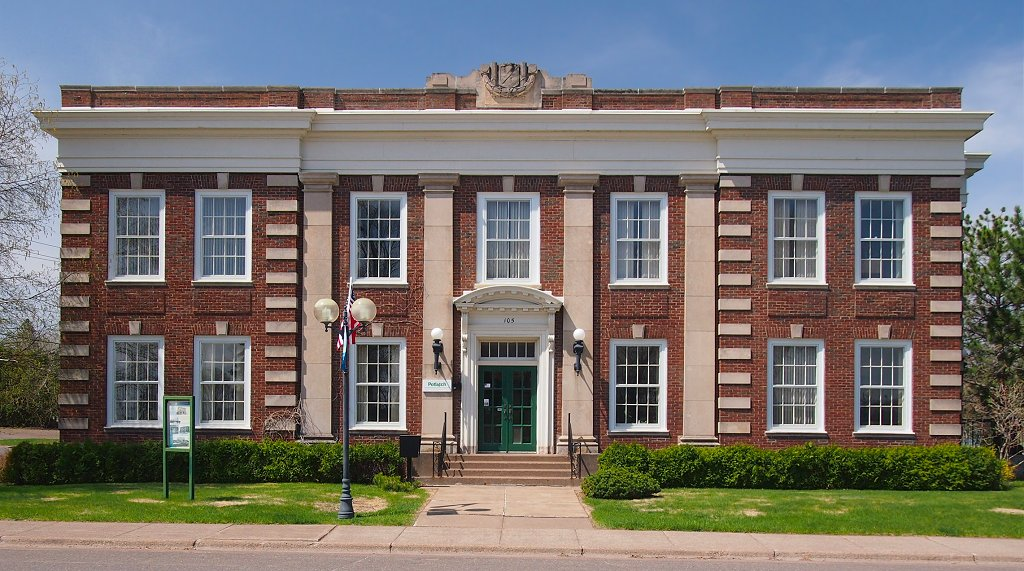
- Cloquet City Hall from the east-northeast

- Location within Minnesota Location within the United States
- Location: Cloquet, Minnesota
- Coordinates: 46°43′23.33″N 92°27′53.27″W
- Built: 1920
- Architect: Siems, Helmers, Schaffner & Colburn
- Architectural style: Colonial Revival, Late 19th And 20th Century Revivals
- NRHP reference No.: 85002312
- Added to NRHP: September 11, 1985

The Cloquet City Hall, also known as the Spafford Building, is located at Avenue B and Arch Street in Cloquet in the U.S. state of Minnesota. The red brick Colonial Revival building was built in 1920 and features quoins, keystones, and an entablature with a high parapet. Tall stone pilasters extend to the high cornice.
