= Cloquet Fire =

1918 forest fire in Minnesota, US

Coordinates: 46°35′N 92°34′W

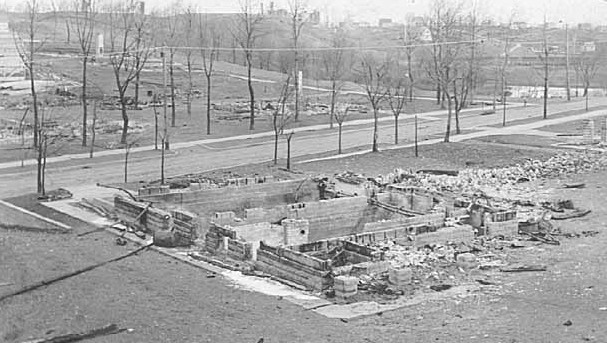
- Date: October 12, 1918; 8:00 am
- Location: Carlton County, Minnesota, United States

Statistics
- Burned area: 250,000 acres (1,000 km^{2})
- Land use: Mixed use

Impacts
- Deaths: 453
- Injuries: ≈ 52,000
- Cost: $72 million ($1.42 billion adjusted for inflation)

Ignition
- Cause: Sparks from train

The Cloquet Fire (/kloʊˈkeɪ/ kloh-KAY) was an immense forest fire in northern Minnesota, United States, in October 1918, caused by sparks on the local railroads amid dry conditions. The fire left much of western Carlton County devastated, mostly affecting Moose Lake, Cloquet, and Kettle River. Cloquet was hardest hit by the fires; it was the worst natural disaster in Minnesota history in terms of the number of casualties in a single day. It is also the third-deadliest wildfire in recorded history, behind the Peshtigo fire of 1871 and a 1936 wildfire that occurred in Kursha-2.

In total, 453 people died and 52,000 people were injured or displaced. Thirty-eight communities were destroyed, with 250,000 acres (100,000 ha) burned, and $73 million ($1.563 billion in 2025 United States dollars) in property damage; $13 million in federal aid was disbursed.

== Carlton County in the early 20th century ==
Carlton County was known for its logging industry during the early 20th century. The fire burned over dry, harvested land that was vulnerable to wildfire. The logging industry employed most of the area workforce. The railroad, which came to the area in 1870, was a great boost for the logging industry.

In 1874, a large lumber mill was built alongside the lakeshore. The mill along the river gathered and floated logs downriver, where they were assembled and sawed for retail. When the logging industry was at its peak, one could walk across the lake on the logs covering the water's surface.

With a new century approaching, open lands in Carlton County were overrun by farmers purchasing land from the mill. The mill's main incentives for sales to farmers were the government grants on the land. With more farmers arriving each year, the population and activity in Carlton County grew substantially. Stores, lawyers, and livestock businesses were established and the economy flourished.

== Fire ==
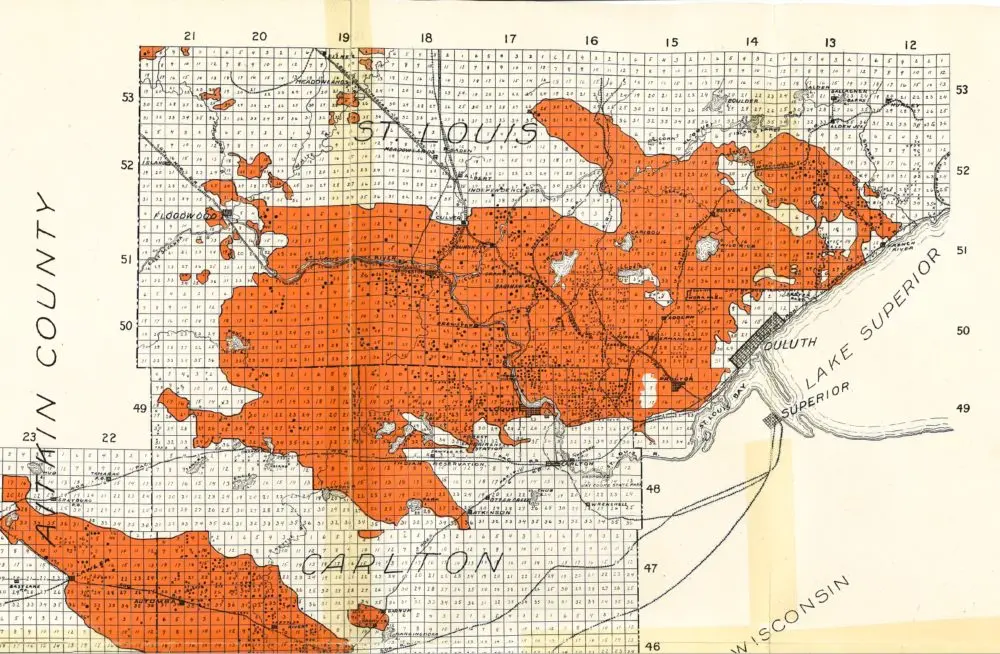
Map of the fire's extent prepared in 1919

On October 10, 1918, two men working near a railroad siding northwest of Cloquet saw a passenger train pass by the siding, and soon thereafter discovered a fire burning through grass and piles of wood. The fire could not be contained, and by October 12, it and other fires had spread through northern Minnesota.

What is often called simply the Cloquet Fire was really 50 or more fires that combined in a single incident. It had two major theaters, one called the Cloquet–Duluth Fire and the other the Moose Lake Fire.

The Cloquet–Duluth Fire began before noon on October 10 when a Great Northern locomotive ignited a small fire at Milepost 62 northwest of Cloquet. It smoldered for two days, then came alive when a cold front brought stiff winds and a steep drop in humidity. At about 1:30 p.m. this fire began to move and joined with others. It reached the Fond du Lac Ojibwe reservation around 7:15 and the city of Cloquet around 8:00. Winds had by then risen to 60 mph or better.

The Moose Lake fire—at least five fires combined—started on October 4 along railroad tracks near Tamarack in Aitkin County; it stayed small till the increasing winds and falling humidity of October 12 whipped it up early that afternoon. It burned southeast toward the towns of Kettle River and Moose Lake, combining with other fires along the way. As the fire neared Moose Lake around 7:30 that evening, relief trains rescued a few hundred people. Most who survived, however, did so by taking refuge in Moose Head Lake.

When asked about the scene at Cloquet, Albert Michaud, a special police officer in Cloquet, was quoted by the New York Times,

At 6 o'clock last night, a forest ranger gave warning that unless the wind died down the townspeople would have to flee ... The scene at the station was indescribable. There came a rush of wind and the entire town was in flames. The trains pulled out with the fires blazing closely behind them. Women wept and clung to their children, while others cried frantically for their missing ones. The flames licked at the cars. Windows in the coaches were broken by the heat. The engineers and firemen alternately stoked, to give the boilers all the fuel they could stand.

Early reports of the fire circulated rumors that the fires had been intentionally started by "enemy agents", but Cloquet Fire Chief F. J. Longren later confirmed that such rumors were false. One cause of the fire was reportedly sparks from the railroad tracks that lit grass and dry timber, but the rapid progression of the fire through northern Minnesota was caused by numerous factors, such as drought conditions, high winds, and a lack of firefighting equipment.

== Damage and fatalities ==
Many instances of mass deaths were reported. In Moose Lake, an Associated Press correspondent reported seeing 75 bodies piled in a burned building. On a road leading out of Moose Lake, 100 bodies were strewn, according to the New York Times. A relief worker reported that 30 bodies were piled in a cellar between Moose Lake and Kettle River.

Among other structures, the Duluth Country Club and the Children's Home were both complete losses. Within Carlton and southern Saint Louis Counties, the towns of Brookston, Arnold, and Moose Lake were completely destroyed. Cloquet and its surrounding cities were known for the great deforestation caused by the fire.

== Relief operations ==
The fires left thousands of people homeless. About 4,700 Cloquet residents sought refuge in Duluth, Minnesota, and Superior, Wisconsin. In total, close to 12,000 people were left homeless from neighboring towns. The inferno's victims were temporarily sheltered in buildings such as hospitals, schools, churches, armories, and private homes. Doctors were brought in from surrounding areas to help the thousands of injured people.

Several organizations and volunteers risked their lives to help save people and property. The Minnesota Infantry National Guard was called in to help in the relief process. At about 3 p.m. on October 12, Lieutenant Karl A. Franklin and Captain Henry Tourtelotte of the Fourth Regiment of the National Guard were contacted to aid the Rice Lake Road area. After speaking with Cloquet's mayor and its police chief, Robert McKercher, Tourtelotte and nine other people headed for Duluth to assemble his troops and offer immediate assistance. A couple of companies were assigned to controlling the fire, which they were unable to do despite their best efforts. After torrents of flame battered them down, they instead began to focus on the survivors.

Commanding Officer Roger M. Weaver of the 3rd Battalion realized the worsening severity of the situation. By 5:40 p.m., he had called on Weaver and his men, who prepared for action. Scores of men assembled in less than an hour and were then dispatched to several hazard sites to help extinguish the fire.

The firefighters' efforts saved several important structures, among them the St. James Catholic Orphanage and the Nopeming Sanatorium. The sanatorium, valued at $350,000 at the time, held close to 200 tuberculosis patients. A party of automobiles broke through walls of flames to save the patients. The Minnesota Home Guard assumed management of the aftermath.

== Recovery ==
The recovery of the region was area-specific because of the damage inflicted. The damage that Duluth sustained was unlikely to affect the economy—although the fire did destroy several small suburbs and farming communities—since most of Duluth's economy at the time centered on transportation and mining, which were relatively unaffected.

The farming industry, though, suffered great losses. Numerous livestock were killed and many acres of farmland were torched. Charles Mahnke, the Moose Lake member of the relief commission, told farmers, "We are going to put you back as well off as you were before." Relief assistance aided the farming community, and with the commission's help the farmers were given places to stay and the means to regain what they had lost. The Northwestern Telephone Company restored phone service by Sunday at approximately 7 p.m. The education of Moose Lake students resumed on January 6, 1919, with assistance from the Red Cross.

Cloquet suffered significantly more damage than Duluth, and the recovery was much slower there and much larger in scale. On October 20, Cloquet citizens met in Carlton County to talk about what needed to be done. Secondary industries included the Northwest Paper Company, the Cloquet Tie and Post Company, the Berst-Forster-Dixfield Company toothpick factory, and the Rathborne, Hair and Ridgeway Company box factory. These secondary industries eventually ascended to be primary industries, but the recovery of the primary industries was far more complex. The Northern Lumber Company, responsible for a significant proportion of Cloquet's economy, had been destroyed.

The Northwest Paper Company began production a week after the fire and gave Cloquet's citizens much-needed jobs. The Red Cross stepped in and constructed many temporary shelters for the victims' families in Cloquet. By November 15, over 200 shelters had been built with the help of the Red Cross and dedicated townspeople. Within five years, Cloquet had industrialized and rebuilt many of the lost railroads, and the citizens had moved from their Red Cross shelters into new houses.

== Memorials ==
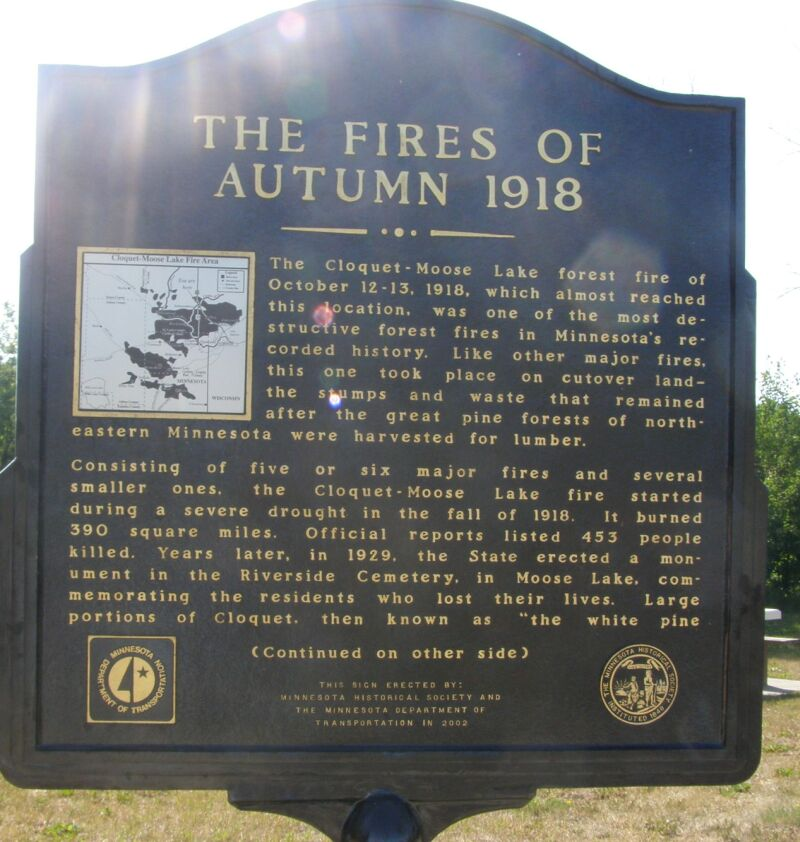

Many memorials commemorate the 1918 fire. A 27-foot monument near Duluth memorializes the 453 lives lost. The Moose Lake Area Historical Society annually honors the lives lost at the Soo Line Depot, which in 1995 was opened as a railroad and fire museum. The Soo Line Depot is both a fire and railroad museum that exhibits the history of the railroads and the story of the fire.

== See also ==
- Peshtigo Fire of 1871
- Great Hinckley Fire of 1894
- Baudette Fire of 1910
- Camp Fire of 2018
- Lahaina fire of 2023
- 2026 Minnesota wildfires
