= Cloquet, Minnesota =

City in Minnesota, United States

Cloquet
- City
- Cloquet Avenue looking East.
- Nickname: Wood City
- Location of the city of Cloquet within Carlton County, Minnesota
- Coordinates: 46°43′18″N 92°27′34″W
- Country: United States
- State: Minnesota
- County: Carlton
- Incorporated (village): 1884
- Incorporated (city): 1904

Government
  - Mayor: Roger Maki

Area
  - Total: 36.01 sq mi (93.27 km^{2})
  - Land: 35.22 sq mi (91.21 km^{2})
  - Water: 0.80 sq mi (2.06 km^{2}) 2.14%
- Elevation: 1,204 ft (367 m)

Population (2020)
  - Total: 12,568
  - Estimate (2022): 12,603
  - Density: 356.9/sq mi (137.79/km^{2})
- Time zone: UTC-6 (Central (CST))
  - Summer (DST): UTC-5 (CDT)
- ZIP code: 55720
- Area code: 218
- FIPS code: 27-12160
- GNIS feature ID: 0641345
- Website: cloquetmn.gov

Cloquet (/kloʊˈkeɪ/ kloh-KAY, Ojibwe: Mookomaan-Onigamiing) is a city in Carlton County, Minnesota, United States, at the junction of Interstate 35 and Minnesota State Highway 33. Part of the city lies within the Fond du Lac Indian Reservation and serves as one of the reservation's three administrative centers. The population was 12,568 at the 2020 census.

== History ==
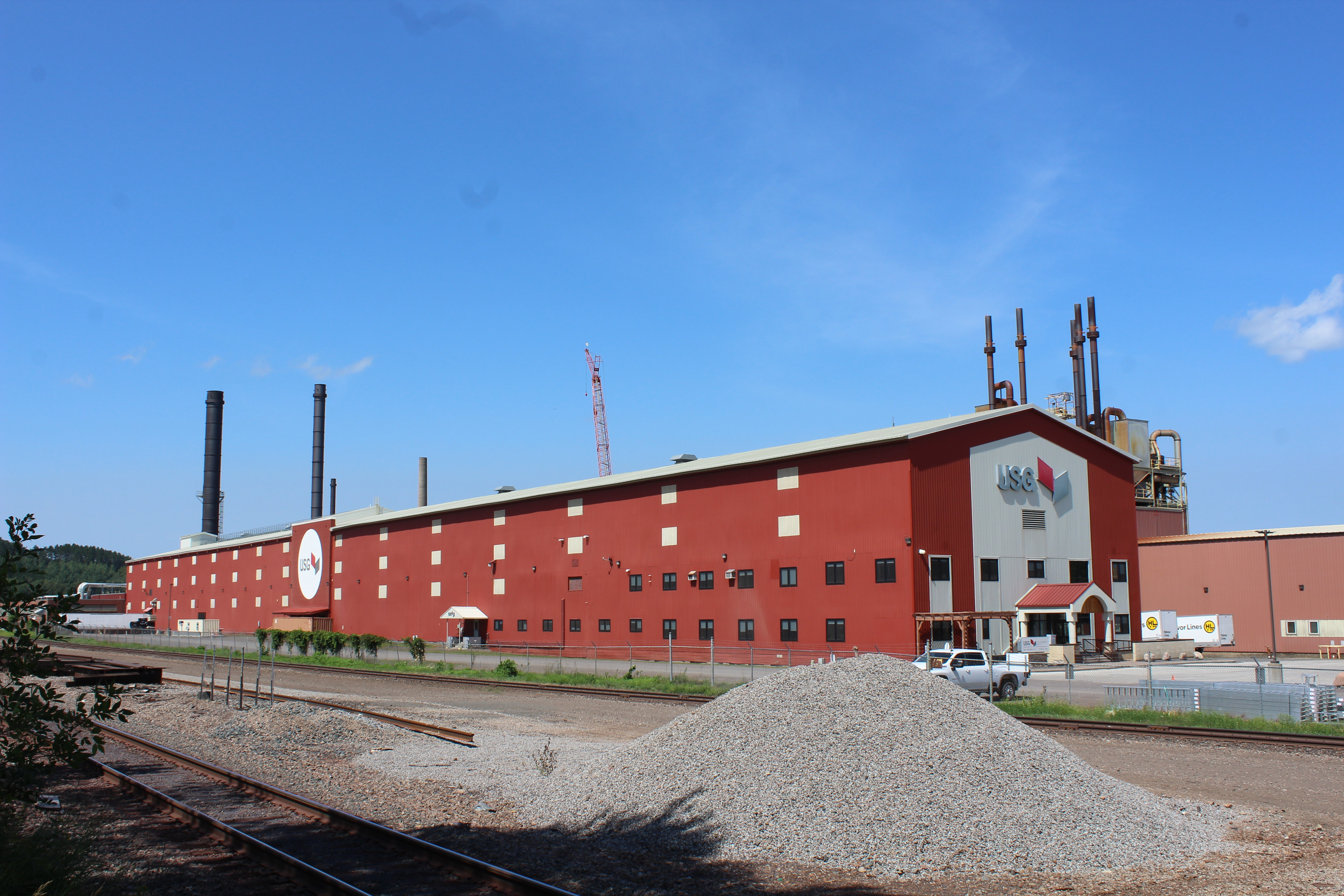
USG Interiors LLC Cloquet Plant

Cloquet began as a group of small settlements around three sawmills: Shaw Town, Nelson Town, and Johnson Town. These became known as Knife Falls, after a local waterfall over sharp slate rocks, and later as Cloquet. The Ojibwe in the area called the area Mookomaan-Onigamiing, meaning 'At the Knife Portage', as the portage to avoid Knife Falls connected the three communities. The area was platted in 1883 and the village of Cloquet was incorporated from the three settlements in 1884. It became a city with a mayor and city council in 1904. The word Cloquet first appeared on an 1843 map of the area by Joseph N. Nicollet, which named the Cloquet River, a tributary of the Saint Louis River, and the Cloquet Rapids to the north. Cloquet is a French surname, but historians have found no source for it. Some speculate that the river was named for the 19th-century French scientists Hippolyte and Jules Cloquet, and the settlement named for the river.

The area was the site of the 1918 Cloquet fire, which destroyed much of the town and killed 453 people.

Before and after World War II Cloquet was home of the nation's strongest consumers' cooperatives. The Cloquet Cooperative Society (founded in 1910) operated two cooperative stores, which handled food, hardware, shoes, dry goods, and furniture. Other cooperative services included a building supply store, a coal yard, a mortuary, an auto repair shop and a gas service station.

In 1939, the co-op did 35% of the business in the town, and 18% in Carlton County. By the mid-1950s, the consumer society had a membership of 4,262 out of a population of 8,500. This was a national record, given that the total business of all American co-ops combined represented only 0.5% of the economy. The Finnish cooperative groups of the area also had an influence on the American cooperative movement in general.

In the 1970s, the city's area was increased to over ten times what it had been in 1970. Despite this, its population declined from 1970 to 1980, even as the number of separate residences increased.

=== Architecture ===
Cloquet is home to the R.W. Lindholm Service Station, the only filling station designed by architect Frank Lloyd Wright and a structure now on the National Register of Historic Places.

== Geography ==
According to the United States Census Bureau, the city has an area of 36.01 square miles (93.3 km^{2}), of which 35.22 square miles (91.2 km^{2}) is land and 0.8 square miles (2.1 km^{2}) is water.

Cloquet is along the Saint Louis River, 20 miles southwest of Duluth.

=== Climate ===
Cloquet has a Humid continental climate (Köppen Climate Classification Dfb) typical of its location in northern Minnesota, with warm summers and long, cold winters.

Climate data for Cloquet, Minnesota (1991–2020 normals, extremes 1900–present)
Month	Jan	Feb	Mar	Apr	May	Jun	Jul	Aug	Sep	Oct	Nov	Dec	Year
Record high °F (°C)	52 (11)	57 (14)	79 (26)	88 (31)	94 (34)	98 (37)	105 (41)	98 (37)	96 (36)	86 (30)	72 (22)	57 (14)	105 (41)
Mean daily maximum °F (°C)	18.2 (−7.7)	24.0 (−4.4)	36.8 (2.7)	50.4 (10.2)	64.3 (17.9)	73.5 (23.1)	78.5 (25.8)	76.2 (24.6)	67.2 (19.6)	51.7 (10.9)	35.0 (1.7)	22.7 (−5.2)	49.9 (9.9)
Daily mean °F (°C)	9.9 (−12.3)	14.3 (−9.8)	26.4 (−3.1)	39.1 (3.9)	51.4 (10.8)	60.7 (15.9)	66.3 (19.1)	64.6 (18.1)	56.4 (13.6)	43.0 (6.1)	28.4 (−2.0)	15.8 (−9.0)	39.7 (4.3)
Mean daily minimum °F (°C)	1.7 (−16.8)	4.6 (−15.2)	16.1 (−8.8)	27.9 (−2.3)	38.4 (3.6)	47.8 (8.8)	54.0 (12.2)	53.0 (11.7)	45.6 (7.6)	34.3 (1.3)	21.9 (−5.6)	9.0 (−12.8)	29.5 (−1.4)
Record low °F (°C)	−45 (−43)	−41 (−41)	−35 (−37)	−7 (−22)	8 (−13)	24 (−4)	30 (−1)	26 (−3)	19 (−7)	0 (−18)	−24 (−31)	−37 (−38)	−45 (−43)
Average precipitation inches (mm)	1.00 (25)	0.98 (25)	1.44 (37)	2.41 (61)	3.48 (88)	4.75 (121)	4.33 (110)	4.18 (106)	3.56 (90)	3.26 (83)	1.82 (46)	1.46 (37)	32.67 (830)
Average snowfall inches (cm)	13.5 (34)	13.5 (34)	10.3 (26)	6.4 (16)	0.3 (0.76)	0.0 (0.0)	0.0 (0.0)	0.0 (0.0)	0.0 (0.0)	1.8 (4.6)	9.6 (24)	15.9 (40)	71.3 (181)
Average precipitation days (≥ 0.01 in)	9.8	8.4	8.6	9.9	11.9	13.3	12.2	10.7	11.1	12.1	9.6	11.1	128.7
Average snowy days (≥ 0.1 in)	12.3	9.2	5.6	2.6	0.2	0.0	0.0	0.0	0.0	1.1	6.9	12.7	50.6
Source: NOAA

== Demographics ==
Historical population
Census	Pop.	Note	%±
1880	93		—
1890	2,530		2,620.4%
1900	3,072		21.4%
1910	7,031		128.9%
1920	5,127		−27.1%
1930	6,782		32.3%
1940	7,304		7.7%
1950	7,685		5.2%
1960	9,013		17.3%
1970	8,699		−3.5%
1980	11,142		28.1%
1990	10,885		−2.3%
2000	11,201		2.9%
2010	12,124		8.2%
2020	12,568		3.7%
2022 (est.)	12,603		0.3%
U.S. Decennial Census; 2020 Census

=== 2020 census ===
As of the 2020 census, Cloquet had a population of 12,568. The median age was 37.7 years. 24.9% of residents were under the age of 18 and 17.3% of residents were 65 years of age or older. For every 100 females there were 95.0 males, and for every 100 females age 18 and over there were 92.8 males age 18 and over.

The population density was 356.9 inhabitants per square mile (137.8/km^{2}). 79.5% of residents lived in urban areas, while 20.5% lived in rural areas.

There were 5,103 households in Cloquet, of which 30.5% had children under the age of 18 living in them. Of all households, 41.0% were married-couple households, 19.6% were households with a male householder and no spouse or partner present, and 29.5% were households with a female householder and no spouse or partner present. About 32.4% of all households were made up of individuals and 12.8% had someone living alone who was 65 years of age or older.

There were 5,399 housing units, at an average density of 153.3 per square mile (59.2/km^{2}), of which 5.5% were vacant. The homeowner vacancy rate was 0.7% and the rental vacancy rate was 5.9%.

Racial composition as of the 2020 census
Race	Number	Percent
White	10,050	80.0%
Black or African American	106	0.8%
American Indian and Alaska Native	1,369	10.9%
Asian	85	0.7%
Native Hawaiian and Other Pacific Islander	9	0.1%
Some other race	63	0.5%
Two or more races	886	7.0%
Hispanic or Latino (of any race)	230	1.8%

=== 2010 census ===
As of the census of 2010, there were 12,124 people, 4,959 households, and 3,126 families residing in the city. The population density was 344.4 inhabitants per square mile (133.0/km^{2}). There were 5,235 housing units at an average density of 148.7 per square mile (57.4/km^{2}). The racial makeup of the city was 84.4% White, 0.4% African American, 10.8% Native American, 0.5% Asian, 0.1% from other races, and 3.7% from two or more races. Hispanic or Latino of any race were 1.3% of the population.

There were 4,959 households, of which 32.9% had children under the age of 18 living with them, 43.1% were married couples living together, 14.4% had a female householder with no husband present, 5.6% had a male householder with no wife present, and 37.0% were non-families. 30.5% of all households were made up of individuals, and 12.9% had someone living alone who was 65 years of age or older. The average household size was 2.40 and the average family size was 2.96.

The median age in the city was 37 years. 25.5% of residents were under the age of 18; 8.9% were between the ages of 18 and 24; 25.5% were from 25 to 44; 25% were from 45 to 64; and 15.2% were 65 years of age or older. The gender makeup of the city was 48.7% male and 51.3% female.

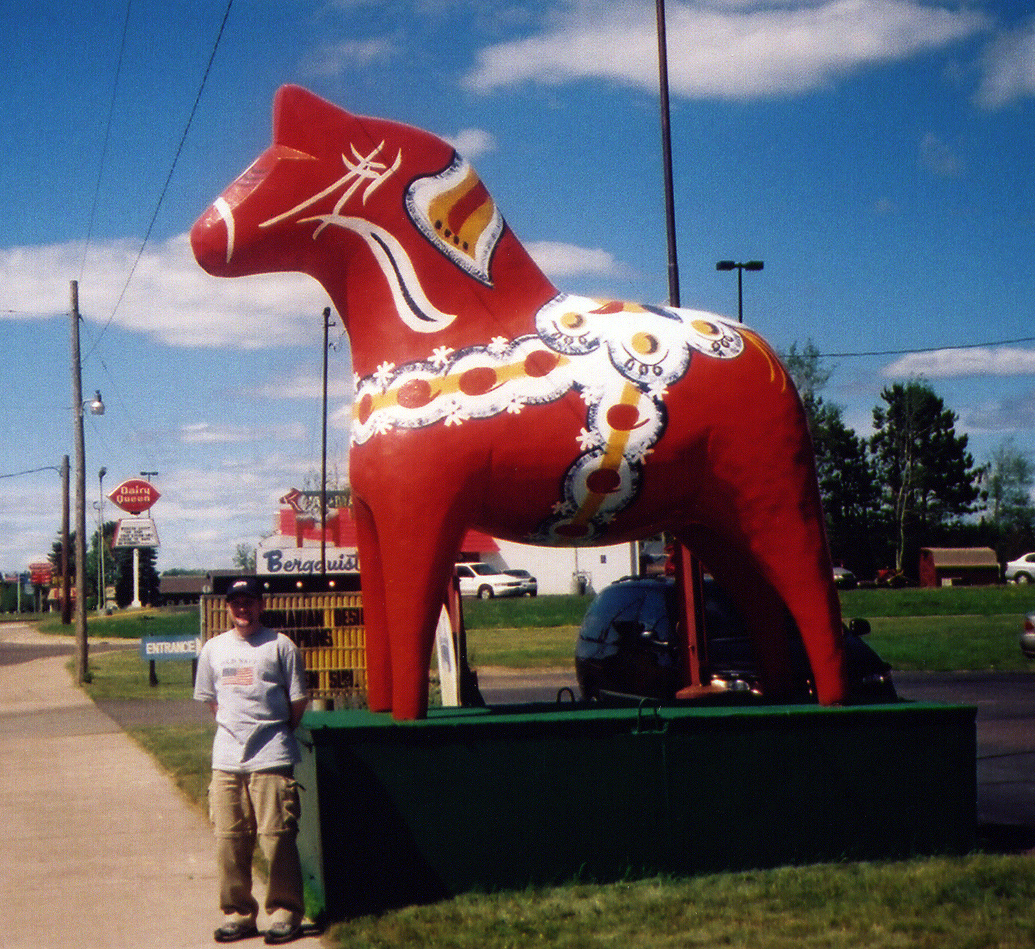
A large Dalecarlian horse

== Infrastructure ==
=== Major highways ===
- Interstate 35
- Minnesota State Highway 33

== Education ==
Most of Cloquet is zoned to Cloquet Public School District; a small portion is zoned to Carlton Public School District.

There is a K-12 tribal school, Fond du Lac Ojibwe School, affiliated with the Bureau of Indian Education (BIE).

== Notable people ==
- Gertrude Esteros, design professor at the University of Minnesota
- U.W. "Judge" Hella, director of Minnesota State Parks
- Jerry Knickerbocker, Minnesota state legislator and businessman
- Jessica Lange, actress
- Jamie Langenbrunner, former NHL player
- Clarence Larson, chemist, Commissioner, U.S. Atomic Energy Commission
- Corey Millen, former NHL player. Former head coach with Minnesota Wilderness
- Barbara Payton, actress
- Derek Plante, former NHL player. Currently an assistant coach with Chicago Blackhawks
- Roy W. Ranum, mayor of Cloquet and Minnesota state senator
- Lawrence Yetka, Associate Justice of the Minnesota Supreme Court
