= Swan Lake Fire =

2019 wildfire in the American state of Alaska

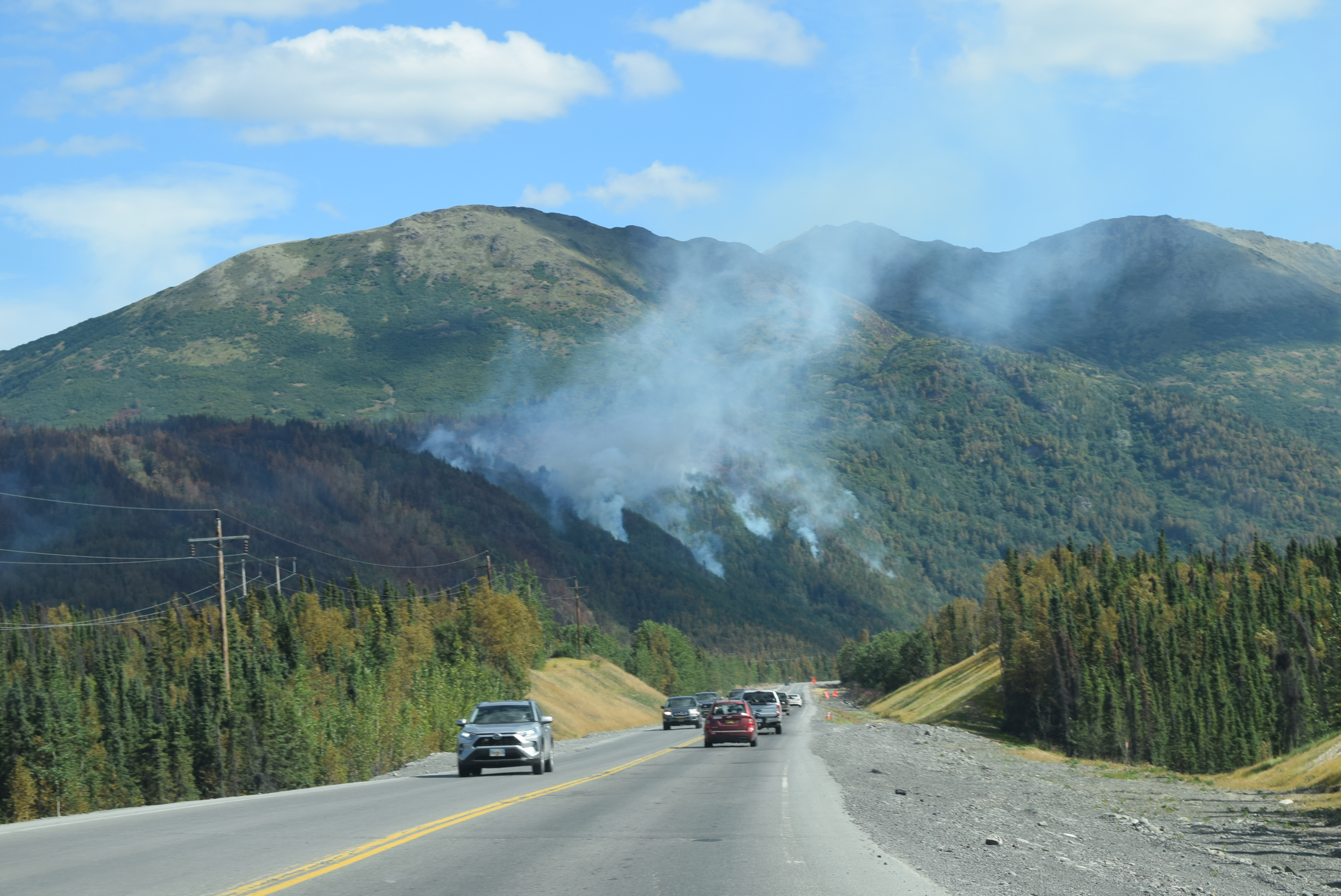
- The fire burning near the Sterling Highway
- Date: June 5, 2019–
- Location: Five miles northeast of Sterling, Alaska, United States
- Coordinates: 60.631°N 150.438°W

Statistics
- Burned area: 167,164 acres (67,649 ha)

Impacts
- Deaths: 0
- Injuries: 11
- Structures lost: 0

Ignition
- Cause: Lightning strike

Map
- Location in Alaska

The Swan Lake Fire was a large lightning-caused wildfire that burnt between Sterling and Cooper Landing on the Kenai Peninsula in Alaska from June 5, 2019, until the autumn of that year. In total, the fire burned approximately 170,000 acres (69,000 hectares).

== Background and ignition ==
Southcentral Alaska had an exceptionally hot, dry spring and summer season in 2019. 2019 saw the second-warmest month of June in the state's history, which, combined with dry conditions created near perfect conditions for wildfires. The Kenai Peninsula normally experiences only one or two lightning-caused fires each year, but in early June 2019 four such fires were ignited in a matter of days, with the Swan Lake fire being by far the largest. While 2019 is by no means the worst fire season in Alaska's history, the fire season has been trending towards longer and more intense activity, with human-caused climate change as the apparent cause. The fire ignited in an area of the Kenai National Wildlife Refuge that is under limited management, where naturally occurring wildfires are generally allowed to burn unchecked and are seen as natural and beneficial.

== Spread and firefighting efforts ==
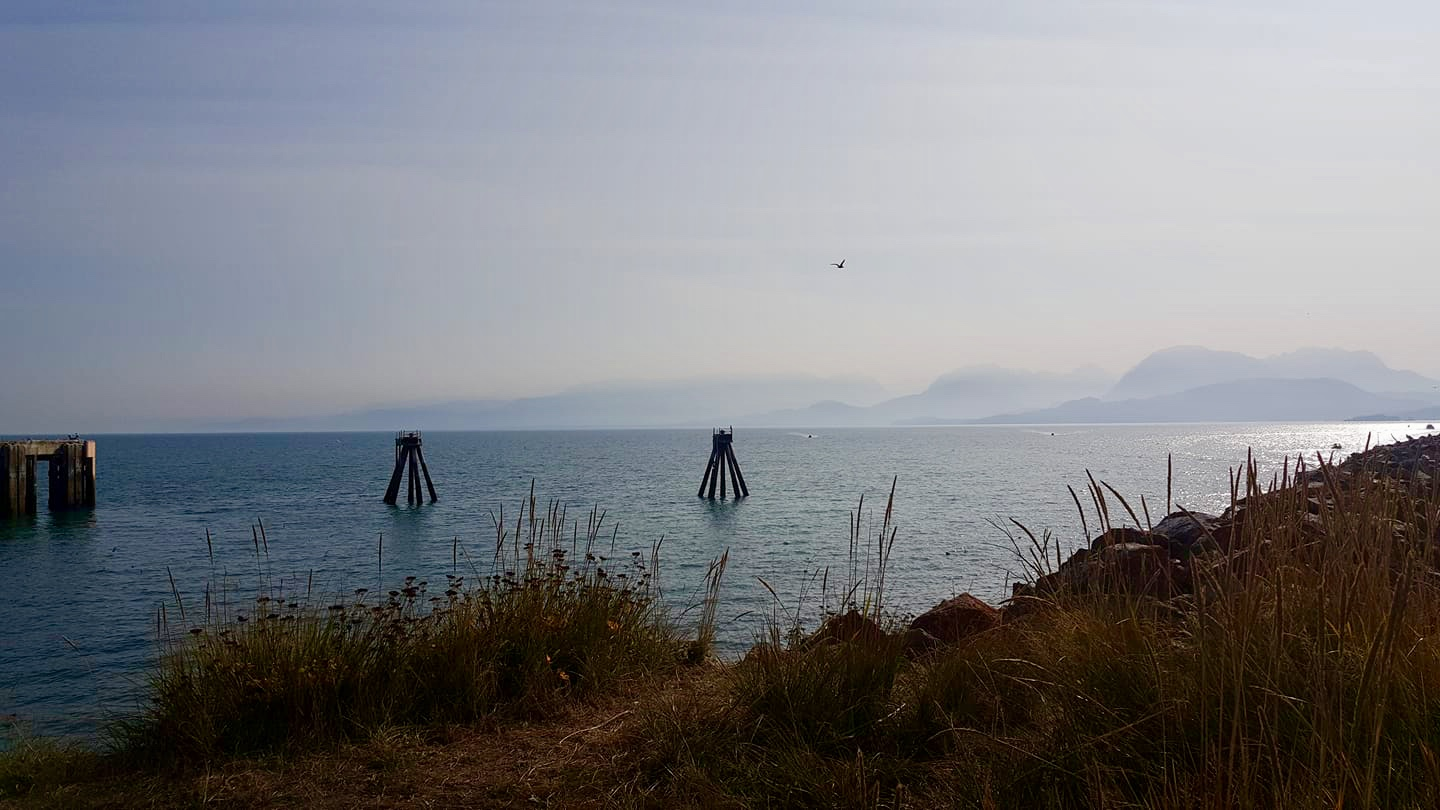
Smoke from the August flare-up seen in Kachemak Bay, about 80 miles (130 km) from the fire.

By June 13 the fire had consumed more than 7,000 acres (2,800 ha) of wild land, mostly black spruce. The southwest corner of the fire was approaching the Sterling Highway corridor, which is the sole major road providing access to the western peninsula. Forty firefighters were deployed to prevent the fire from approaching or crossing the highway, and refuge managers closed a number of access roads deemed too close to the fire area.

Over the next several weeks the fire expanded and numerous closures and burn suspensions were issued, as well as air quality alerts for some areas. By July 9 the fire had grown to 99,000 acres (40,000 ha) and more than 400 personnel were involved in fire fighting efforts. By mid-July a drought had been declared on the peninsula. At the end of July fire growth had slowed and significant containment work had been completed, and firefighters were mostly redeployed to other fires.

== August flare-up ==
Over the weekend of August 17, high winds caused the fire to flare up and spread eastward towards Cooper Landing. Wildlife refuge and national forest managers closed several areas in response, motorists were warned of poor conditions and delays, and residents of Cooper Landing were advised to be prepared to evacuate. In the west the fire spread across the highway for the first time, and portions of the Skilak Lake road, the only alternative route through the area between Cooper Landing and Sterling, were closed due to fire encroachment and poor visibility. The highway itself was reduced to one-way-at-a-time traffic in one lane. Later that same day, the fire crowned in this area and began moving rapidly, forcing intermittent closure of the highway over the next several days. Type I hotshot crews and heavy water bombers were dispatched to the fire. As the flareup continued and other wildfires sprung up in the area more firefighters were deployed and a disaster was declared by the Kenai Peninsula Borough.

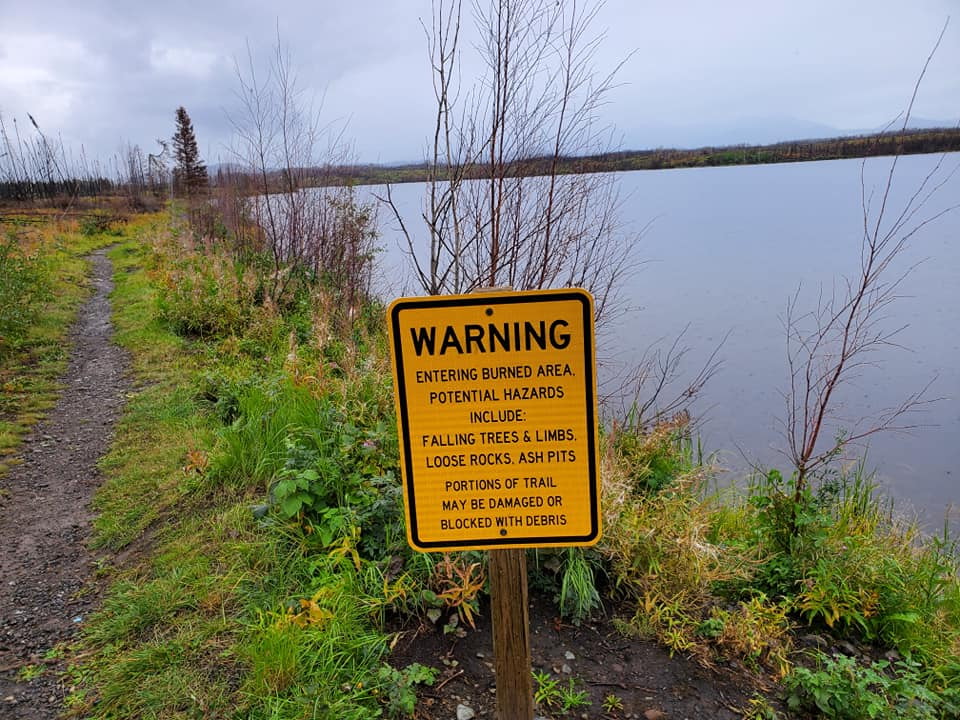
sign at a trail head with warnings about post-fire dangers

By late August the fire had spread closer to Cooper Landing and residents were put on a "set" warning, meaning they should be ready to evacuate at any time. Emphasis was placed on preserving structures and homes as the fire managed to cross control lines. More than 650 personnel were engaged in fighting the fire; the estimated cost of the efforts through the last week of August is 30 million dollars. Alaska's statutory fire season, in which open burning is regulated and permits are required, was extended by a month by the Alaska Department of Natural Resources in response to this and other fires.

== September ==
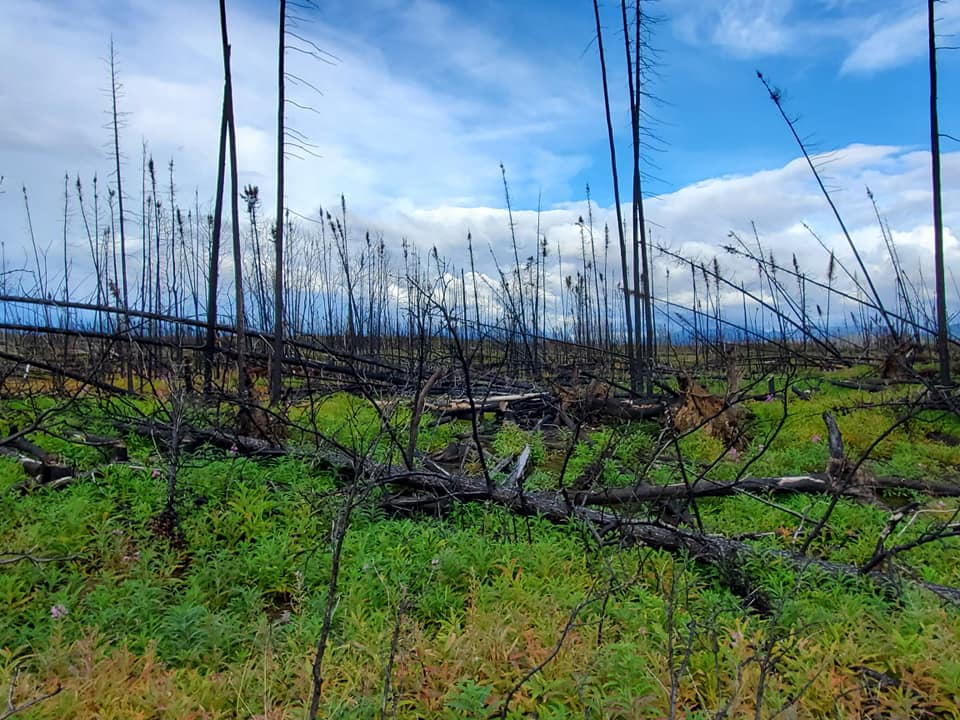
Burned area in Kenai National Wildlife Refuge

By September 1, the weather had changed to the more usual damp, rainy conditions normal for that time of year and fire growth had slowed considerably. Firefighting personnel continued mop-up operations including constructing control lines and using drones to search for hotspots along the perimeter. Pilot car operations continued on the Sterling Highway and travelers were still warned to expect long delays during the Labor Day holiday weekend. By the seventh, rain had helped considerably and much progress was made in constructing control lines, although hot spots remained on the western edge in hard to access areas which were targeted by helicopter operations. By the end of the month the usual rainy season was well underway and the fire was over 80% contained. Major remaining hazards include ash pits and weakened trees. Burned area emergency response teams took actions to reduce danger over the following week. On September 30 a final update was issued, indicating the fire was 90% contained and further significant growth seemed unlikely. All burned areas of the wildlife refuge were still considered closed due to the after-fire danger. As of September 30, the fire had burned 167,164 acres (67,649 ha).

The event islanded the electricity grid in Soldotna and all the way to Fairbanks for months.

== See also ==
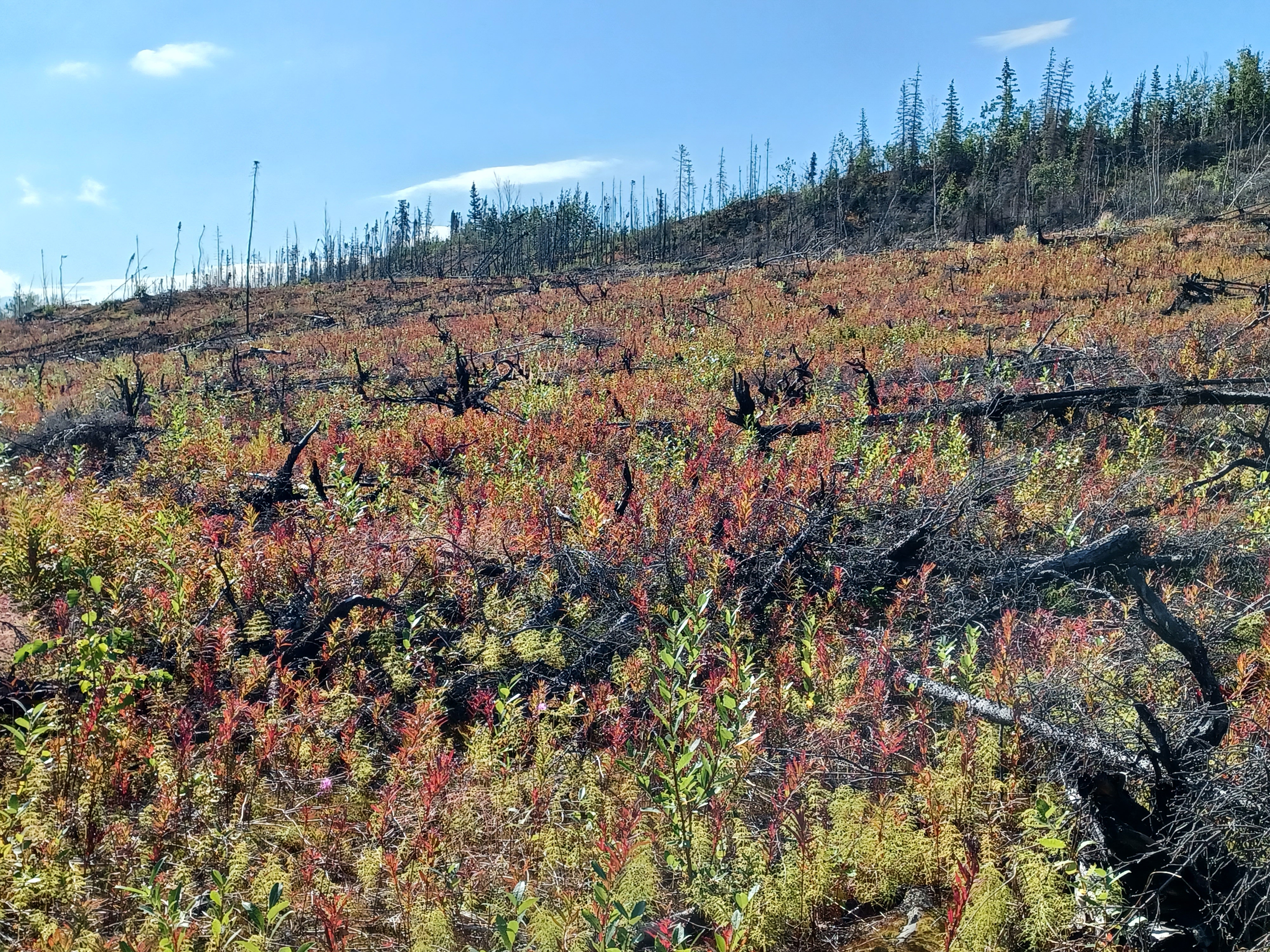
A formerly heavily forested hillside in August 2023, four years after the fire.

- 2007 Caribou Hills Fire
- Funny River Fire
- Mile 17 Fire
- Shanta Creek Fire
