= Funny River, Alaska =

- Census-designated place
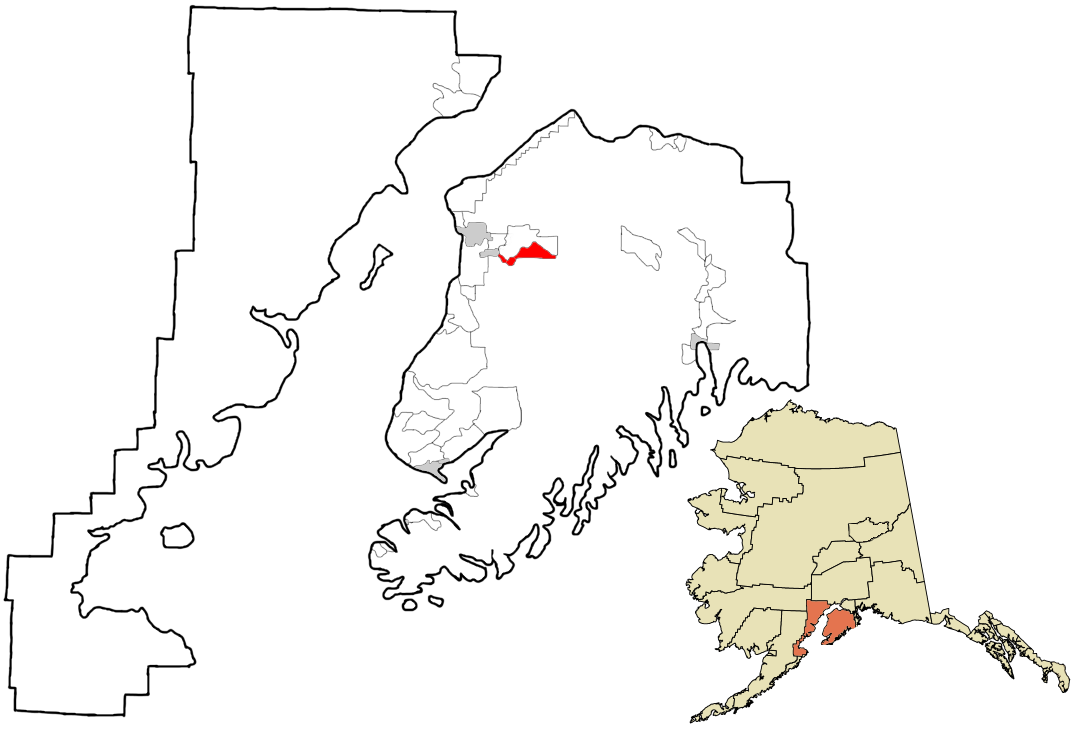
- Location in Kenai Peninsula Borough, Alaska
- Coordinates: 60°29′38″N 150°46′54″W
- Country: United States
- State: Alaska
- Borough: Kenai Peninsula

Government
  - Borough mayor: Peter Micciche
  - State senator: Jesse Bjorkman (R)
  - State reps.: Ben Carpenter (R); Justin Ruffridge (R)

Area
  - Total: 28.95 sq mi (74.98 km^{2})
  - Land: 26.71 sq mi (69.19 km^{2})
  - Water: 2.24 sq mi (5.79 km^{2})
- Elevation: 289 ft (88 m)

Population (2020)
  - Total: 1,103
  - Density: 41.3/sq mi (15.94/km^{2})
- Time zone: UTC-9 (Alaska (AKST))
  - Summer (DST): UTC-8 (AKDT)
- Area code: 907
- FIPS code: 02-27145
- GNIS feature ID: 1865552

Funny River is a census-designated place (CDP) in Kenai Peninsula Borough, Alaska, United States. As of the 2020 census, Funny River had a population of 1,103.

It is best known for the Funny River Fire in May 2014.

== Geography ==
Funny River is located on the northwestern side of the Kenai Peninsula at 60°29′38″N 150°46′54″W (60.493952, -150.781743). It is bordered to the west by Soldotna and to the north by the Kenai River, across which is the CDP of Sterling. Road access to the community is only from Soldotna, as there are no bridges across the Kenai River between Funny River and Sterling. The Funny River, for which the community is named, enters the CDP from the south and joins the Kenai River 6 miles (10 km) upstream from (east of) Soldotna. Browns Lake is in the eastern part of the CDP.

According to the United States Census Bureau, the Funny River CDP has a total area of 29.0 square miles (75.0 km^{2}), of which 26.7 square miles (69.2 km^{2}) are land and 2.2 square miles (5.8 km^{2}), or 7.70%, are water.

== Demographics ==
Historical population
Census	Pop.	Note	%±
2000	636		—
2010	877		37.9%
2020	1,103		25.8%
U.S. Decennial Census

Funny River first appeared on the 2000 U.S. Census as a census-designated place (CDP).

=== 2020 census ===
As of the 2020 census, Funny River had a population of 1,103. The median age was 55.6 years. 17.1% of residents were under the age of 18 and 33.8% of residents were 65 years of age or older. For every 100 females there were 112.9 males, and for every 100 females age 18 and over there were 108.2 males age 18 and over.

0.0% of residents lived in urban areas, while 100.0% lived in rural areas.

There were 507 households in Funny River, of which 20.1% had children under the age of 18 living in them. Of all households, 51.5% were married-couple households, 28.6% were households with a male householder and no spouse or partner present, and 14.2% were households with a female householder and no spouse or partner present. About 30.4% of all households were made up of individuals and 12.9% had someone living alone who was 65 years of age or older.

There were 1,158 housing units, of which 56.2% were vacant. The homeowner vacancy rate was 1.8% and the rental vacancy rate was 4.0%.

Racial composition as of the 2020 census
Race	Number	Percent
White	923	83.7%
Black or African American	5	0.5%
American Indian and Alaska Native	43	3.9%
Asian	15	1.4%
Native Hawaiian and Other Pacific Islander	2	0.2%
Some other race	12	1.1%
Two or more races	103	9.3%
Hispanic or Latino (of any race)	37	3.4%

=== 2010 census ===
As of the census of 2010, there were 877 people, 278 households, and 182 families residing in the CDP. The population density was 23.4 inhabitants per square mile (9.0/km^{2}). There were 621 housing units at an average density of 22.8 per square mile (8.8/km^{2}). The racial makeup of the CDP was 93.71% White, 1.73% Native American, 1.10% Asian, 1.42% from other races, and 2.04% from two or more races. 0.47% of the population were Hispanic or Latino of any race.

There were 278 households, out of which 22.3% had children under the age of 18 living with them, 57.9% were married couples living together, 3.6% had a female householder with no husband present, and 34.5% were non-families. 25.9% of all households were made up of individuals, and 4.7% had someone living alone who was 65 years of age or older. The average household size was 2.29 and the average family size was 2.80.

In the CDP, the population was spread out, with 20.1% under the age of 18, 3.8% from 18 to 24, 25.9% from 25 to 44, 38.7% from 45 to 64, and 11.5% who were 65 years of age or older. The median age was 45 years. For every 100 females, there were 114.9 males. For every 100 females age 18 and over, there were 119.9 males.

The median income for a household in the CDP was $43,047, and the median income for a family was $51,518. Males had a median income of $29,821 versus $21,875 for females. The per capita income for the CDP was $22,648. About 3.2% of families and 3.5% of the population were below the poverty line, including 5.9% of those under age 18 and none of those age 65 or over.
