= Shanta Creek Wildfire =

Lightning caused forest fire in the Kenai National Wildlife Refuge

Coordinates: 60°20′22″N 150°52′32″W

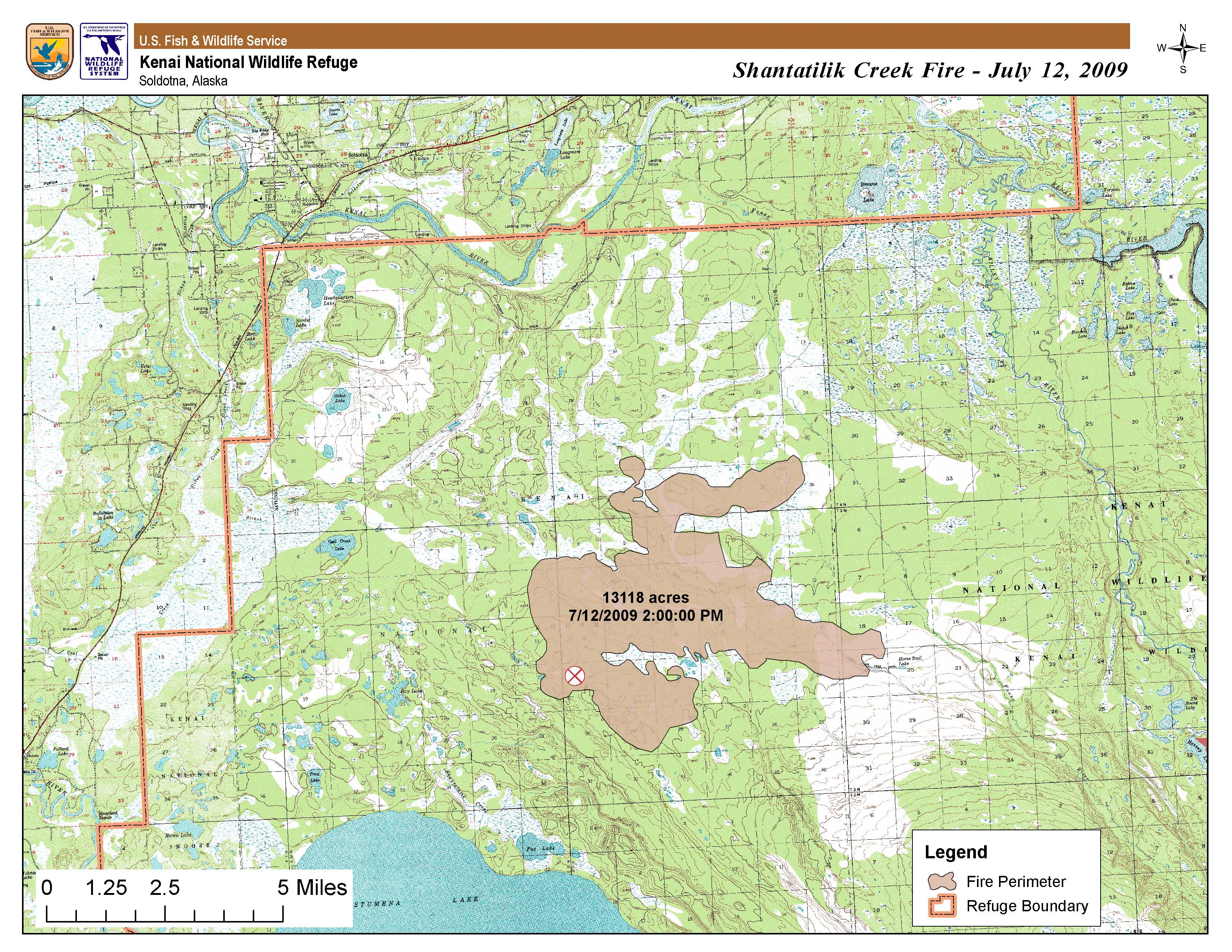
Map of the fire on July 12. Soldotna is top center, Tustumena Lake is lower left.

The Shanta Creek Wildfire was a lightning caused forest fire that started on June 29, 2009, in the Kenai National Wildlife Refuge on the Kenai Peninsula of Alaska. More than 13,000 acres (53 km^{2}; 20 sq mi) were burned and over 400 personnel were involved in the firefighting effort.

== Background ==
During the late 1990s, the Kenai Peninsula was infested by spruce bark beetles. Many thousands of acres of spruce trees died as a result. Although the dead trees had subsequently been mostly removed from populated areas, there were still significant stands of dead trees in wilderness areas. Southcentral Alaska had been experiencing an unusually warm, dry summer that contributed to optimal conditions for a fire. Initially, firefighting efforts were not made due to the fire being naturally caused and located in a wilderness area that had been designated a "limited fire suppression area." Black spruce forests have a life cycle of about 70 years, while white spruce have a cycle of 100 years or more. The initial fire area had not burned since 1871, and therefore the burn was seen as natural and beneficial. The fire was monitored by the US Fish and Wildlife Service, which manages the refuge, and was allowed to grow unchecked to over 4,000 acres (16 km^{2}; 6.3 sq mi).

== Firefighting efforts ==
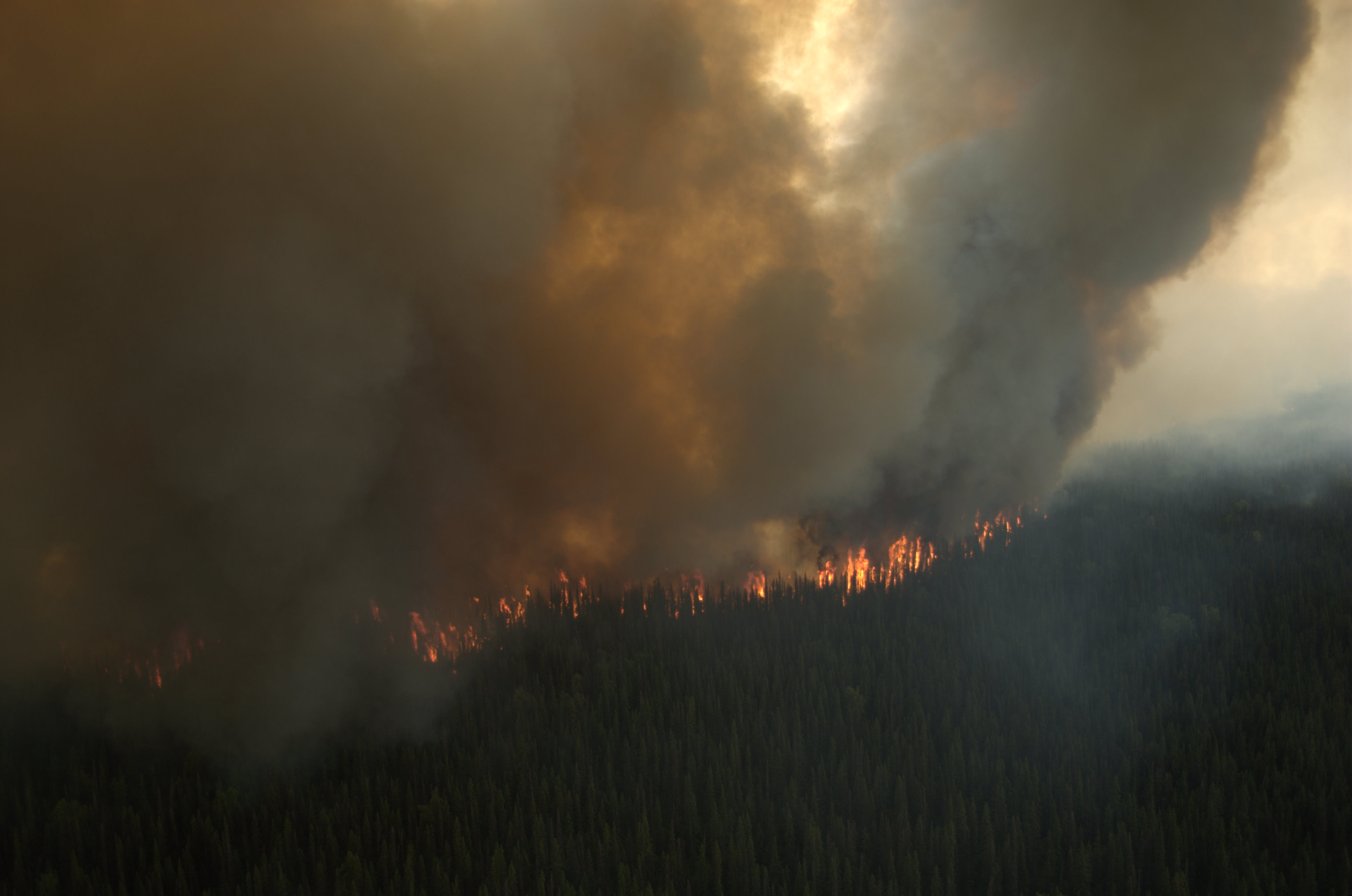
Aerial view of the wildfire

On July 9, the fire grew to over 10,000 acres (40 km^{2}; 16 sq mi) and began moving towards lightly populated areas outside of Kasilof and Soldotna. More resources were ordered to protect these areas. By June 11, over 400 persons were fighting the fire, and hotshot crews and bulldozers were utilized to create fire breaks. Air tankers and helicopters were also used to dump water and fire retardant near homes threatened by the fire. A temporary "tent city" was established at Skyview High School to house firefighters and support staff, and a no fly zone was established around the fire area. Smoke from the fire and others blazing simultaneously in Interior Alaska contributed to a visible haze of smoke over Anchorage and much of south-central Alaska. Fire managers began to take crews off the fire and reassign them after light but sustained rain fell on the fire for several days starting on July 18. By July 21, the fire had stopped expanding, and around 200 staff remained at the fire to monitor and conduct mop-up operations of remaining hot spots near populated areas.

== Aftermath ==
On July 21, the fire was declared to be contained, and command and control were returned to the Refuge by federal fire managers. The total area burned at that time was 13,221 acres (53.50 km^{2}; 20.658 sq mi). The overall cost of the firefighting effort was estimated at six million dollars. There were no deaths and no residences were burned.

== See also ==
- Mile 17 fire
- 2007 Caribou Hills fire
- Funny River Fire
- Swan Lake fire
