= Funny River Fire =

Forest fire near Soldotna, Alaska

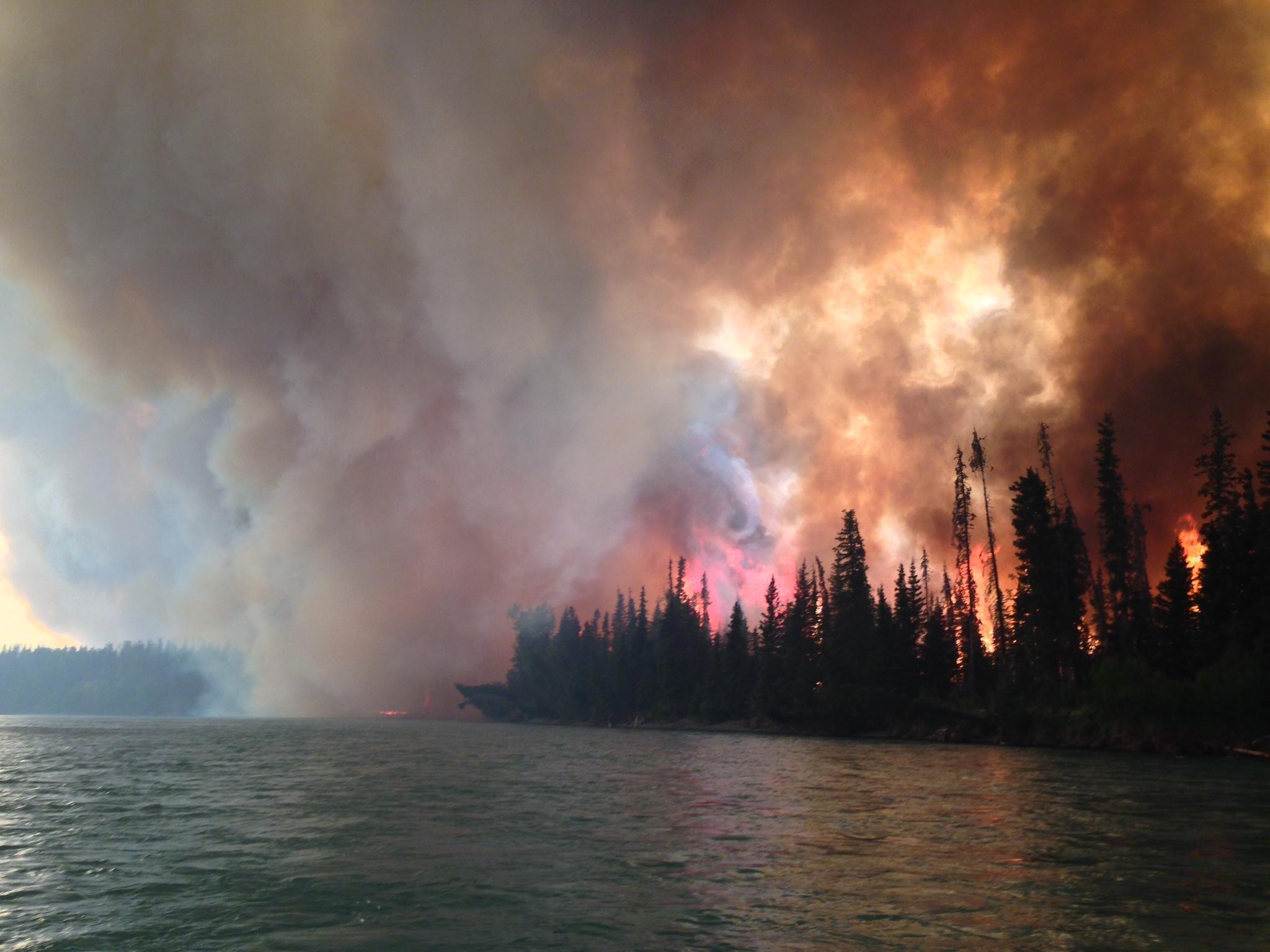
- Flames rage adjacent to the river on May 25.
- Date: May 19, 2014 – December 8, 2014
- Location: Soldotna, Alaska
- Coordinates: 60.439°N 150.962°W

Statistics
- Burned area: 193,597 acres (783 km^{2})

Map
- Location within Alaska

The Funny River Fire or the Funny River Horse Trail Fire was a forest fire that began on May 19, 2014, near Soldotna, Alaska. It quickly grew to over 20,000 acres, and by May 23 it had burned over 67,000 acres or about 105 square miles. Tustumena Lake acted as a natural barrier keeping the fire from spreading south. A July 10 overflight found no sign of the fire continuing to burn. It had grown to 195,858 acres.

As of May 23, 2014, the entire fire was confined to the Kenai National Wildlife Refuge. On May 24, the fire had expanded to 96,584 acres or about 151 square miles with 20% containment. The fire grew by almost 29 square miles between 5:00 PM and 11:00 PM on the evening of the 23rd. The last of the fire was contained by December 8, 2014.

The fire started approximately where the Funny River Horse Trail intersects the Funny River Road on the Kenai Peninsula at about 7:00 PM and was likely human-caused.

The fire had consumed 156,041 acres or 243 square miles as of 4:00 PM Alaska Time of May 25. It jumped the Kenai River in the Torpedo Lake area between Sterling and Skilak Lake due to burning embers that had fallen in the Kenai Keys area, but these were quickly extinguished. There were several evacuation orders in effect including areas of Kasilof, Sterling, and Lower Skilak Lake.

While firefighters were fighting the fire, human remains were found that were later identified as James Beaver of Soldotna, Alaska, who had been missing since 2011. This led to an investigation that eventually revealed errors by the Alaska State Troopers in incorrectly identifying human remains of another missing person and releasing them to the wrong family.

== See also ==
- Swan Lake fire
- Shanta Creek fire
