= 2007 Caribou Hills Fire =

2007 wildfire in Alaska, United States

Coordinates: 60.046°N 151.667°W

The Caribou Hills Fire was a 2007 wildfire that burned near Ninilchik, Alaska, and expanded extremely rapidly, making it at one point the top firefighting priority in the United States. It soon moved toward the town and at its peak threatened approximately 300 structures.

== Background ==
The fire began June 19, 2007, when sparks created by a hand-held grinder being used to sharpen a shovel ignited dry grass. The couple who accidentally started the fire attempted to beat it out with a shovel and the shirts off their backs, but the dry conditions in the area at the time caused the fire to spread rapidly, and they had to be rescued by helicopter as they were soon surrounded by flames. In addition to the dry grass in the area, the Kenai Peninsula was still recovering from an infestation of spruce bark beetles that had killed thousands of acres of trees during the late 1990s and early 2000s, resulting in an enormous "tinder box" in the largely unpopulated area of Caribou Hills.

== Firefighting efforts ==
This fire came at a time when two other wildfires were already blazing in South-central Alaska, stretching the state's firefighting capabilities. Firefighters called for evacuations of residents in outlying areas, specifically the Ninilchik 40 subdivision and the Caribou Hills cabins. On June 21, 2007 smoke from this fire began rolling into Anchorage and other populated areas, including Homer, Kenai, and Soldotna, leading to air quality and health advisories, and the establishment of a "no fly zone" in the fire's area.

By June 24, 2007, approximately 75 structures had been destroyed by the fire, including 34 cabins, one primary residence and 40 outbuildings such as sheds and outhouses. The Federal Emergency Management Agency began funding of the fire suppression effort on June 23, 2007. While every possible effort, including aerial deployment of fire suppression chemicals, was made near populated areas, a more low-impact approach, mostly creating firebreaks with bulldozers, was used on the parts of the fire that entered the Kenai National Wildlife Refuge.

== Aftermath ==
The fire was declared under control in early July 2007. It destroyed a total of 55,438 acres (22,435 ha) of wilderness, and about 197 structures, including 88 cabins and other homes and 109 outbuildings. The exact number of buildings destroyed may never be known as the Caribou Hills area is a popular destination for snowmachine enthusiasts in the winter, and many small overnight cabins had been built over the years without permits or other documentation. On June 5, 2019, a lightning strike cause a new fire in the footprint of the 2007 fire.

== See also ==
- Mile 17 fire
- Shanta Creek fire
