= Mile 17 Fire =

2009 wildfire in Alaska

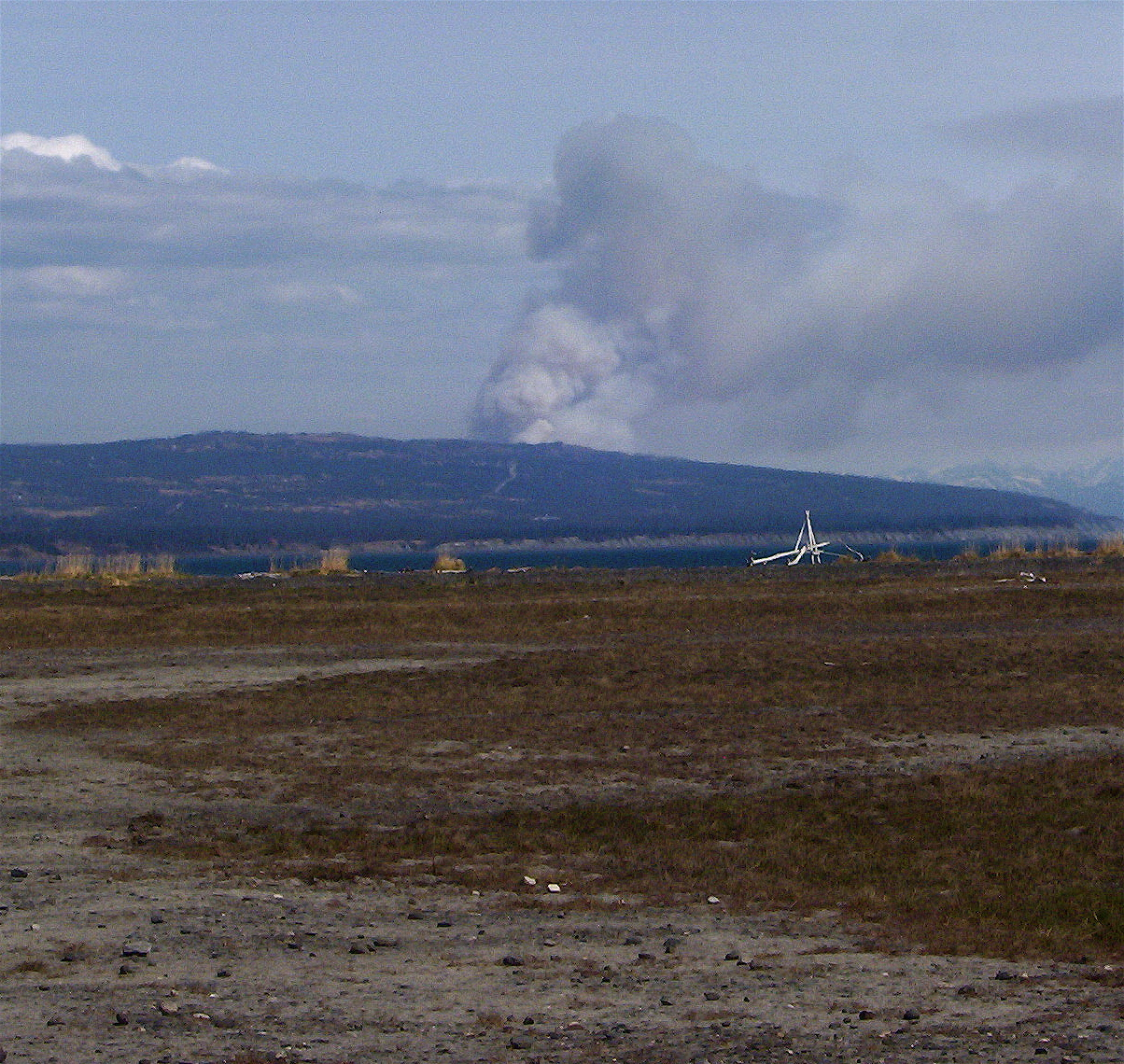
- Smoke plume from May 13 flare-up seen from the Homer Spit, about 20 miles (32 km) to the southwest.
- Date: May 12, 2009 - May 17, 2009
- Coordinates: 59.664°N 151.469°W

Statistics
- Total area: 1,074 acres (4.35 km^{2})

Impacts
- Structures lost: 8

Ignition
- Cause: Downed Power Line

Map
- Area of Fire in Alaska

The Mile 17 Fire was a wildfire that began around mile 17 of East End Road outside of Homer, Alaska, on Tuesday, May 12, 2009, and lasted until Sunday, May 17.

== Background ==
South-central Alaska had been experiencing unusually warm, dry weather for about 10 days before the fire, and a downed power line apparently ignited dry brush on May 12. Parts of the fire were in forested areas that are inside Kachemak Bay State Park. The Kachemak Bay area was infested by spruce bark beetles in the 1990s, and many dead, dry trees remained in this area.

== Firefighting efforts ==
On Wednesday, May 13, the fire was seemingly under partial control in the morning, but flared up violently due to afternoon winds and began to spread again. Fire crews asked for all available resources, and by the late afternoon, over 100 firefighters and numerous pieces of heavy equipment were committed to the fire, along with water tanker trucks and fire-suppression aircraft. The fire continued to spread rapidly and evacuation orders were issued for residents in the area, including the villages of Razdolna and Voznesenka. In less than 24 hours, the fire had spread from 70 acres (280,000 m^{2}) to an estimated 700 acres (2.8 km^{2}), and efforts were shifted from actively fighting the fire to protecting lives and homes.

As of the afternoon of May 14, the fire had grown to nearly 1,000 acres (4.0 km^{2}) and was continuing to spread. Two strike teams were dispatched by the Anchorage Fire Department and Central Mat-Su Fire Department, and a team of smokejumpers arrived. A type-1 incident command team took over command of firefighting efforts.

On Friday, May 15, the weather changed and a light rain fell in the fire area, allowing crews an opportunity to contain the fire. Firefighters reported that many areas within the fire perimeter were not burned, and only two structures were confirmed lost. The fire was estimated to be 25% contained.

By the weekend, about 245 personnel were on hand to combat the fire. Continued humid weather facilitated major progress over May 16 and 17, and the fire was 65% contained. Three homes and two other buildings were confirmed destroyed, out of about 50 homes in the fire area.

== Aftermath ==
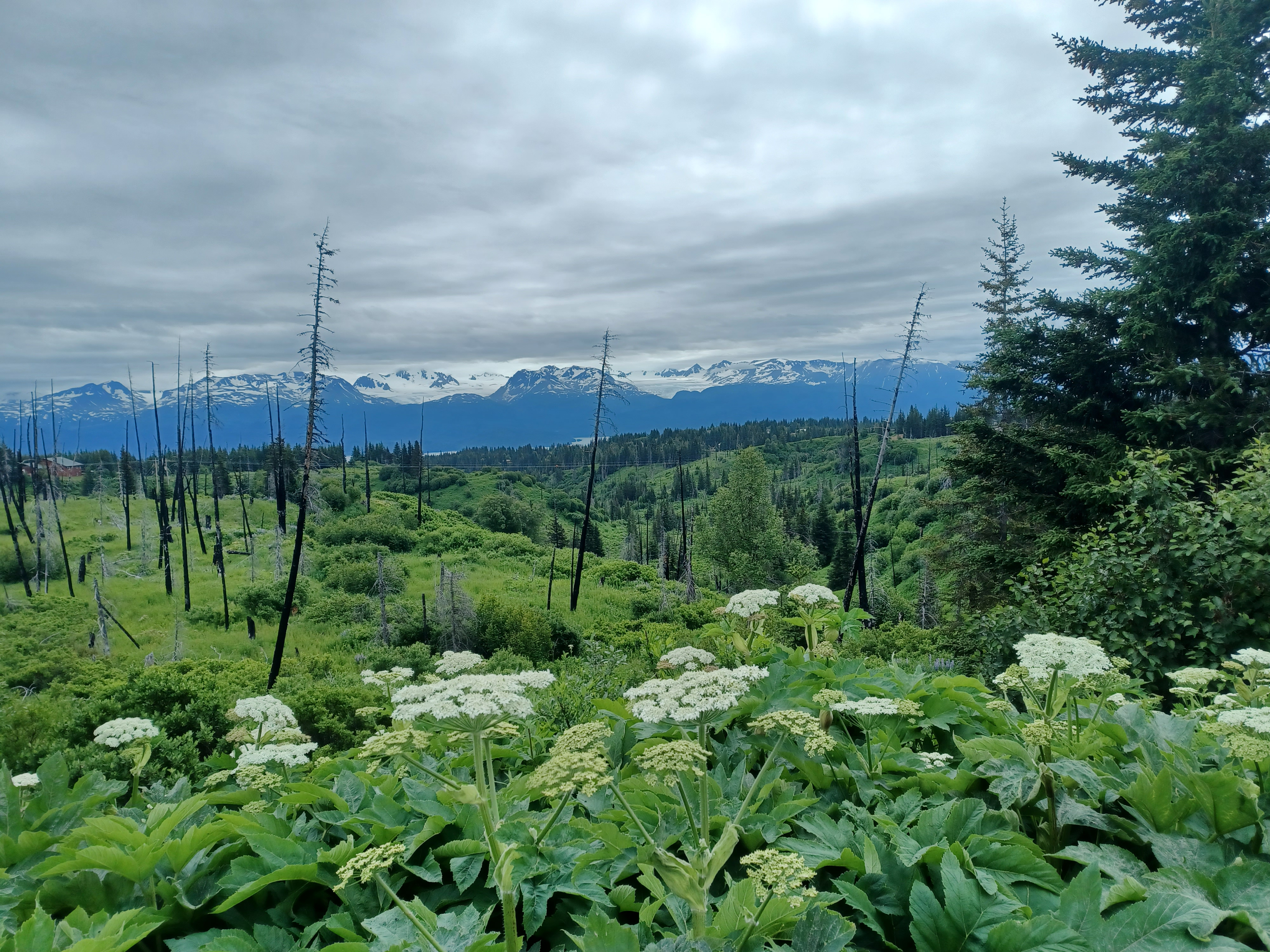
An area burned by the fire, fifteen years later

At 6:00 pm on Sunday, May 17, the fire was declared to be 100% contained. Fire-fighting efforts shifted to finding remaining hot spots inside the perimeter and extinguishing them. The total affected area was 1,074 acres (4.35 km^{2}), with eight structures destroyed.

== See also ==
- 2007 Caribou Hills fire
- Shanta Creek fire
