= Sterling, Alaska =

- Census-designated place
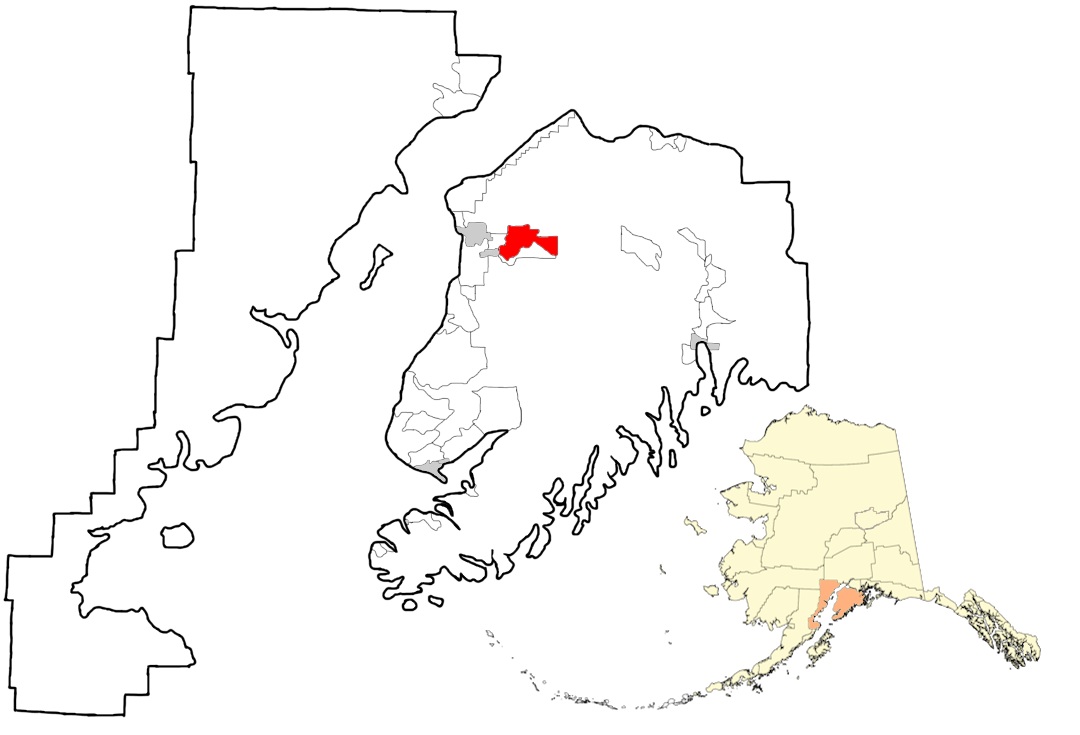
- Location in Kenai Peninsula Borough, Alaska
- Coordinates: 60°31′47″N 150°47′52″W
- Country: United States
- State: Alaska
- Borough: Kenai Peninsula

Government
  - Borough mayor: Peter Micciche
  - State senator: Jesse Bjorkman (R)
  - State rep.: Ben Carpenter (R)

Area
  - Total: 79.64 sq mi (206.26 km^{2})
  - Land: 77.78 sq mi (201.45 km^{2})
  - Water: 1.86 sq mi (4.81 km^{2})
- Elevation: 220 ft (67 m)

Population (2020)
  - Total: 5,918
  - Density: 76.1/sq mi (29.38/km^{2})
- Time zone: UTC-9 (Alaska (AKST))
  - Summer (DST): UTC-8 (AKDT)
- ZIP code: 99672
- Area code: 907
- FIPS code: 02-73070
- GNIS feature ID: 1414063

Sterling is a census-designated place (CDP) in Kenai Peninsula Borough, Alaska, United States. At the 2020 census the population was 5,918, up from 5,617 in 2010. Sterling is the tenth-most populated CDP in Alaska.

== Geography ==
Sterling is located on the western side of the Kenai Peninsula at 60°31′47″N 150°47′52″W (60.529635, -150.797887). It is bordered to the west by Ridgeway, to the southwest by Soldotna, and to the south by Funny River. Soldotna Creek forms the western boundary of the community, and the Kenai River forms the southern boundary.

Alaska Route 1, the Sterling Highway, runs through the community, leading southwest 11 miles (18 km) to the center of Soldotna and east 34 miles (55 km) to Cooper Landing at the outlet of Kenai Lake. The city of Kenai is 22 miles (35 km) to the west via Soldotna.

According to the United States Census Bureau, the Sterling CDP has a total area of 79.7 square miles (206.3 km^{2}), of which 77.8 square miles (201.4 km^{2}) are land and 1.9 square miles (4.9 km^{2}), or 2.36%, are water.

=== Climate ===
Sterling has a continental subarctic climate (Köppen Dsc).

Climate data for Sterling, Alaska (1954-1968 normals and extremes)
Month	Jan	Feb	Mar	Apr	May	Jun	Jul	Aug	Sep	Oct	Nov	Dec	Year
Record high °F (°C)	45 (7)	49 (9)	50 (10)	66 (19)	71 (22)	80 (27)	83 (28)	81 (27)	69 (21)	60 (16)	49 (9)	44 (7)	83 (28)
Mean daily maximum °F (°C)	18.4 (−7.6)	24.7 (−4.1)	32.8 (0.4)	42.8 (6.0)	54.9 (12.7)	62.6 (17.0)	64.7 (18.2)	63.3 (17.4)	54.6 (12.6)	40.9 (4.9)	27.5 (−2.5)	15.6 (−9.1)	41.9 (5.5)
Daily mean °F (°C)	8.7 (−12.9)	13.5 (−10.3)	19.5 (−6.9)	33.0 (0.6)	43.8 (6.6)	51.3 (10.7)	54.4 (12.4)	53.7 (12.1)	45.3 (7.4)	31.9 (−0.1)	19.3 (−7.1)	7.0 (−13.9)	31.8 (−0.1)
Mean daily minimum °F (°C)	−1.1 (−18.4)	2.3 (−16.5)	6.3 (−14.3)	23.1 (−4.9)	32.7 (0.4)	40.0 (4.4)	44.0 (6.7)	44.1 (6.7)	36.1 (2.3)	24.9 (−3.9)	11.2 (−11.6)	−1.6 (−18.7)	21.7 (−5.7)
Record low °F (°C)	−42 (−41)	−47 (−44)	−47 (−44)	−6 (−21)	19 (−7)	25 (−4)	30 (−1)	24 (−4)	12 (−11)	−13 (−25)	−31 (−35)	−41 (−41)	−47 (−44)
Average precipitation inches (mm)	1.04 (26)	1.14 (29)	0.58 (15)	1.00 (25)	0.86 (22)	1.21 (31)	2.54 (65)	2.98 (76)	2.40 (61)	1.43 (36)	1.42 (36)	1.45 (37)	18.04 (458)
Average snowfall inches (cm)	8.7 (22)	14.4 (37)	5.7 (14)	4.2 (11)	0.0 (0.0)	0.0 (0.0)	0.0 (0.0)	0.0 (0.0)	0.0 (0.0)	4.4 (11)	10.5 (27)	13.9 (35)	61.8 (157)
Average precipitation days (≥ 0.01 in)	5	6	4	6	7	9	13	12	13	9	8	8	98
Source: WRCC

== Demographics ==
Historical population
Census	Pop.	Note	%±
1960	115		—
1970	30		−73.9%
1980	919		2,963.3%
1990	3,802		313.7%
2000	4,705		23.8%
2010	5,617		19.4%
2020	5,918		5.4%
U.S. Decennial Census

Sterling first appeared on the 1960 U.S. Census as an unincorporated village. In 1980, it was made a census-designated place (CDP).

=== 2020 census ===
As of the 2020 census, Sterling had a population of 5,918. The median age was 47.0 years. 20.7% of residents were under the age of 18 and 21.8% of residents were 65 years of age or older. For every 100 females there were 111.1 males, and for every 100 females age 18 and over there were 111.0 males age 18 and over.

0.0% of residents lived in urban areas, while 100.0% lived in rural areas.

There were 2,475 households in Sterling, of which 22.7% had children under the age of 18 living in them. Of all households, 57.1% were married-couple households, 22.5% were households with a male householder and no spouse or partner present, and 14.7% were households with a female householder and no spouse or partner present. About 27.8% of all households were made up of individuals and 11.8% had someone living alone who was 65 years of age or older.

There were 3,611 housing units, of which 31.5% were vacant. The homeowner vacancy rate was 3.0% and the rental vacancy rate was 10.7%.

Racial composition as of the 2020 census
Race	Number	Percent
White	5,017	84.8%
Black or African American	21	0.4%
American Indian and Alaska Native	218	3.7%
Asian	74	1.3%
Native Hawaiian and Other Pacific Islander	16	0.3%
Some other race	64	1.1%
Two or more races	508	8.6%
Hispanic or Latino (of any race)	188	3.2%

=== 2000 census ===
As of the 2000 census, there were 4,705 people, 1,676 households, and 1,305 families residing in the CDP. The population density was 60.9 inhabitants per square mile (23.5/km^{2}). There were 2,554 housing units at an average density of 33.0 per square mile (12.7/km^{2}). The racial makeup of the CDP was 92.7% White, 0.4% Black or African American, 3.3% Alaskan Native, 0.5% Asian, 0.1% Pacific Islander, 0.6% from other races, and 2.5% from two or more races. 1.2% of the population were Hispanic or Latino of any race.

There were 1,676 households, out of which 40.0% had children under the age of 18 living with them, 66.5% were married couples living together, 6.7% had a female householder with no husband present, and 22.1% were non-families. 17.6% of all households were made up of individuals, and 3.4% had someone living alone who was 65 years of age or older. The average household size was 2.80 and the average family size was 3.16.

In the CDP, the population was spread out, with 30.6% under the age of 18, 6.9% from 18 to 24, 29.0% from 25 to 44, 26.8% from 45 to 64, and 6.7% who were 65 years of age or older. The median age was 36 years. For every 100 females, there were 108.4 males. For every 100 females age 18 and over, there were 108.2 males.

The median income for a household in the CDP was $47,700, and the median income for a family was $53,889. Males had a median income of $45,063 versus $27,946 for females. The per capita income for the CDP was $20,741. About 7.7% of families and 10.0% of the population were below the poverty line, including 11.8% of those under age 18 and 5.9% of those age 65 or over.

== History ==
The town now known as Sterling was originally called "Naptowne" when it was first opened for settlement in 1947. However, the area—which had a few homesteaders by then—acquired a post office in 1954 which was given the designation of "Sterling" after the Sterling Highway that served the area.

An archaeological site, containing prehistoric Dena'ina house pits, has been discovered near Sterling, showing that the area was inhabited in prehistoric times.

The main industries around Sterling today are support for tourism and sport fishing and hunting.

== Parks ==
Sterling is adjacent to the Kenai National Wildlife Refuge and also two Alaska state parks. Scout Lake State Recreation Site is a 164 acres (66 ha) day-use only park. The park has a picnic shelter and a lake stocked with rainbow trout and Arctic grayling. Morgan's Landing State Recreation Area is the headquarters for Alaska State Parks on the Kenai Peninsula. The park is 279 acres (113 ha) and has a campground and one of the few public access points for bank fishing on the middle Kenai River.
