= Kachemak Bay State Park =

State park in Alaska, United States

Coordinates: 59°31′58″N 151°12′36″W

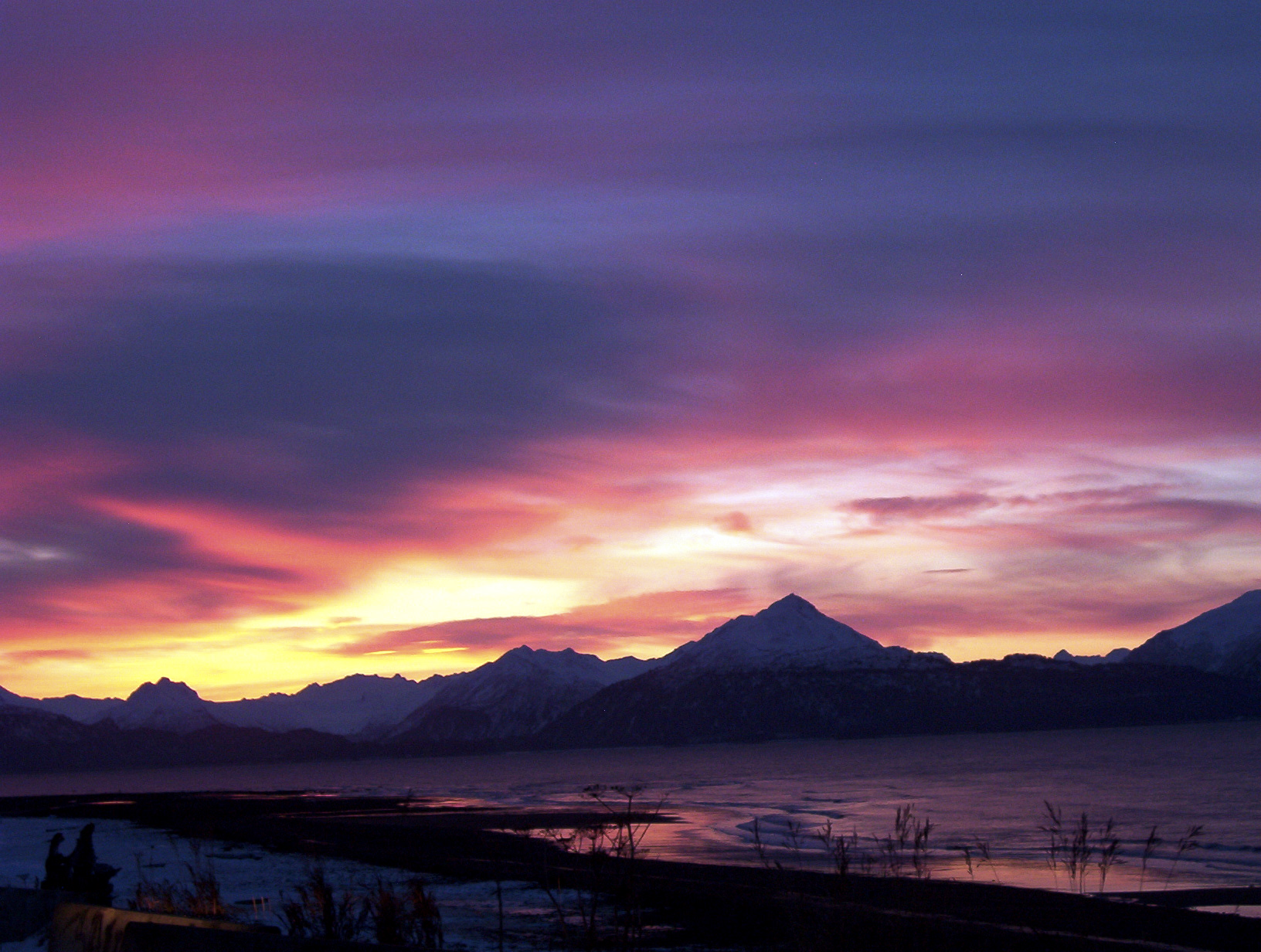
Kachemak Bay at sunrise

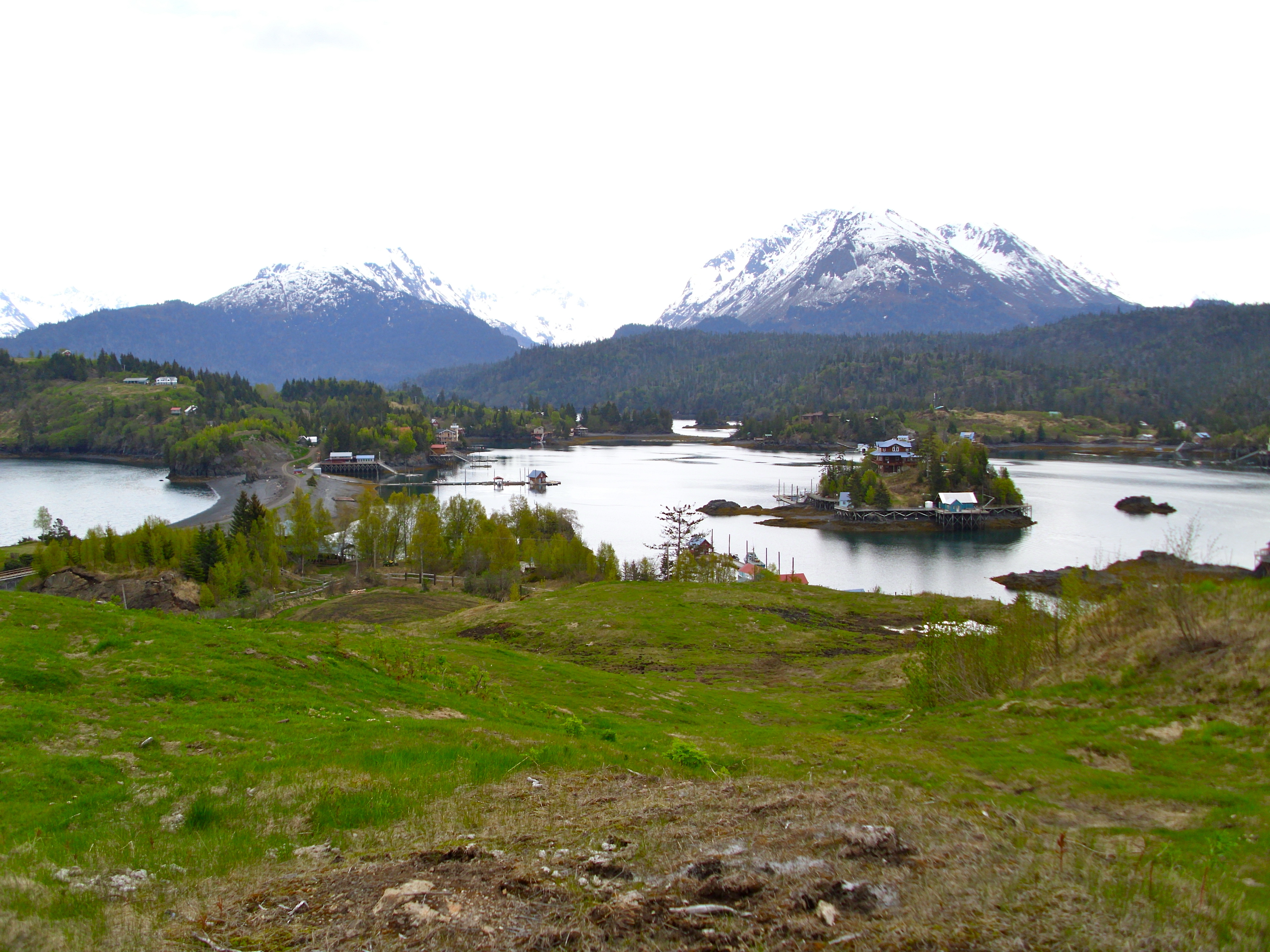
Halibut Cove is one of the main access points to the park.

Kachemak Bay State Park and Kachemak Bay State Wilderness Park is a 400,000-acre (1,600 km^{2}) park in and around Kachemak Bay, Alaska, United States. Kachemak Bay State Park was the first legislatively designated state park in the Alaska State Parks system. Kachemak Bay State Wilderness Park is the state's only legislatively designated wilderness park. No road accesses most areas of the park; visitors normally fly in or travel by boat from Homer.

Kachemak Bay is considered a critical habitat area due to the biodiversity in the area. Wildlife within the park includes marine mammals such as sea otters, sea lions, and whales, large land mammals such as moose and black bears, and numerous sea and land birds. The terrain consists of both rocky and sandy beaches, dense mountain forests, and higher up, glaciers and icefields. Because of the rugged conditions and unpredictable coastal weather, visitors are advised to be prepared for sudden wind, rain, or snowstorms at any time of year, especially at higher elevations, and to file a travel plan with rangers. The park is mostly wild land, although a few cabins and semideveloped campgrounds are seen. The park ranger station is located in Halibut Cove Lagoon.

The Kachemak Bay area was infested with spruce bark beetles during the late 1990s, and thousands of acres have dead trees still standing within the park. At least one wildfire, the Mile 17 fire, burned areas of dead standing spruce on park land.
