= Kenai National Wildlife Refuge =

Wildlife habitat preserve located on the Kenai Peninsula of Alaska, United States

- IUCN category IV (habitat/species management area)
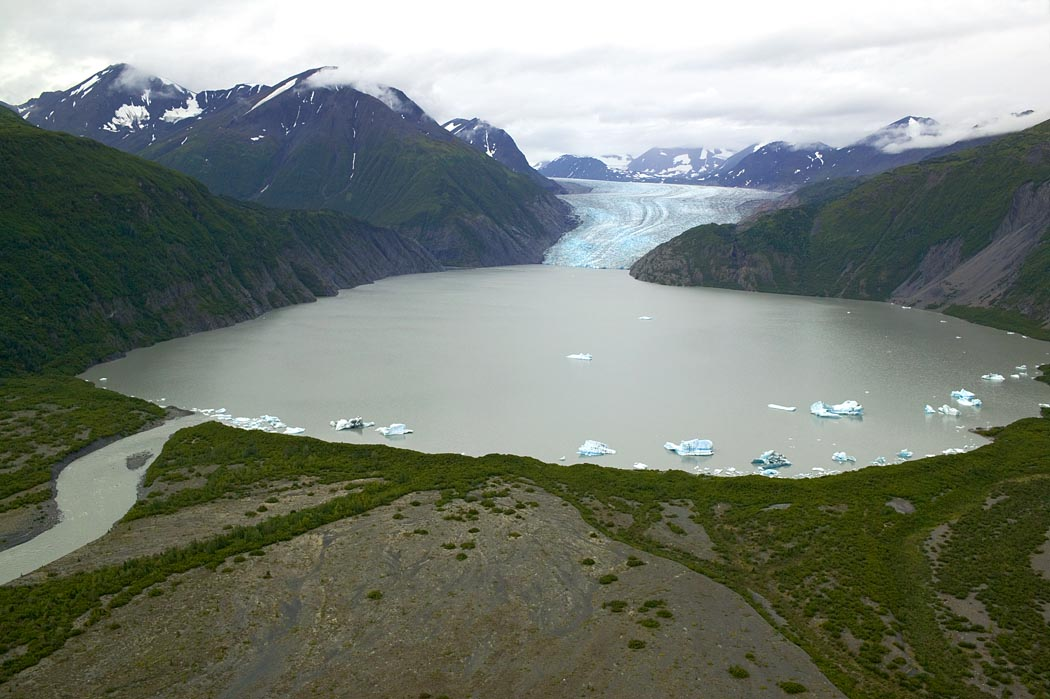
- Glacier and glacial lake in the Kenai National Wildlife Refuge.

- Location within Alaska
- Location: Kenai Peninsula Borough, Alaska, United States
- Nearest city: Soldotna, Alaska
- Coordinates: 60°20′N 150°30′W
- Area: 1.92 million acres (7,770 km^{2})
- Established: 1941 (as Kenai National Moose Range), 1980 (ANILCA, present status as wildlife refuge)
- Governing body: U.S. Fish and Wildlife Service
- Website: Kenai NWR

The Kenai National Wildlife Refuge is a 1.92-million-acre (7,770 km^{2}) wildlife habitat preserve located on the Kenai Peninsula of Alaska, United States. It is adjacent to Kenai Fjords National Park. This refuge was created in 1941 as the Kenai National Moose Range, but in 1980 it was changed to its present status by the Alaska National Interest Lands Conservation Act. The refuge is administered from offices in Soldotna. The Kenai Wilderness protects 1,354,247 acres of the refuge as wilderness area.

== Terrain, flora, and fauna ==
There is a wide variety of terrain in the refuge, including muskeg and other wetlands, alpine areas, and taiga forest. The refuge protects several large mammals, including wolf packs, brown bears, black bears, dall sheep, moose, Canadian lynx, and caribou, as well as thousands of migratory and native birds. There are numerous lakes, including two very large lakes, Skilak Lake and Tustumena Lake as well as the Kenai River, and the refuge is a popular destination for fishing for salmon and trout.

== Activities ==
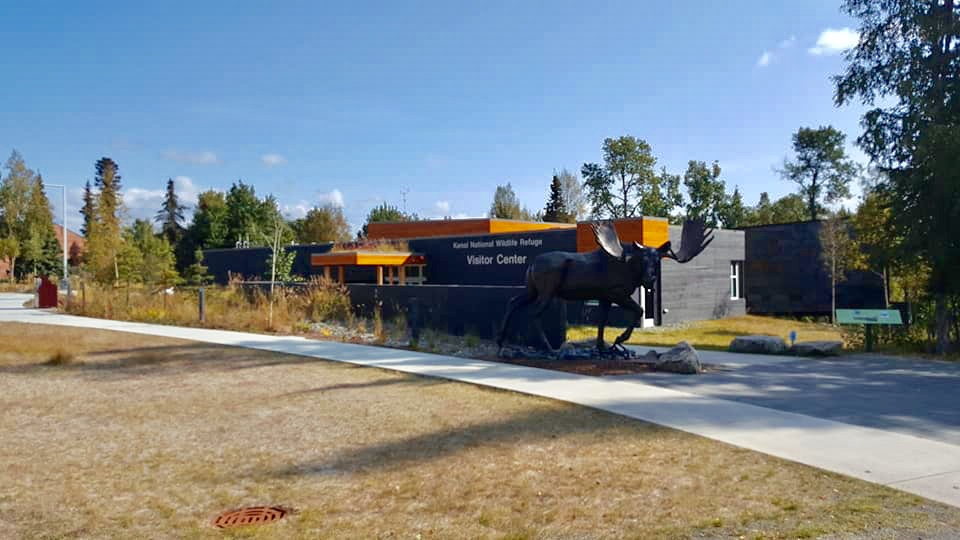
Visitor center at refuge headquarters in Soldotna

=== Boating and camping ===
The refuge has several campgrounds and boat launches, including two developed campgrounds, one at Hidden Lake and another at Skilak Lake, both accessible from Skilak Lake Loop Road, which intersects the Sterling Highway at both ends. Other less-developed campgrounds and campsites are accessible from the Sterling Highway, Skilak Loop Road, Swanson River Road, and Swan Lake Road, the latter of which do not require fees to access. Since 2005 the refuge has offered 16 cabins for public use via a reservation system, with some cabins accessible only via boat.

==== Canoe trails ====
The Kenai National Wildlife Refuge has multiple small canoe systems linking lakes or groups of lakes. It further possess two larger canoe trails, which link large networks of lakes and rivers, often via portages. The most popular, the Swan Lake Canoe Trail, travels 60 miles, beginning at Canoe Lake (the west entrance), and terminates alternatively at Portage Lake (the east entrance) or the confluence of the Moose and Kenai rivers in Sterling. The longest, the Swanson River Canoe Route, spanning 80 miles, begins either at Paddle Lake or Gene Lake, and ends where the Swanson River meets the Cook Inlet at Captain Cook State Park.

=== Hiking ===
There are over 110 miles of hiking trails in the refuge, accessed from the Sterling Highway, Skilak Lake Loop Road, Swanson River Road, various campgrounds, and the refuge visitor center and headquarters. These hikes range from difficult, multi-day back-country hikes to easier, short paved-trail walks.

=== Hunting ===
As with most national wildlife refuges, the Kenai National Wildlife Refuge is open to hunting with certain restrictions, in particular in the area of Skilak Lake Road.

== Wildfires ==
Naturally occurring wildfires are seen as beneficial in the long run for boreal forests, and so many areas of the Refuge are classified as limited suppression areas and fires may be allowed to burn unchecked so long as they do not move toward populated areas or Refuge facilities. In any given year there is a high likelihood of several small fires burning within the refuge.

In 2009 lightning ignited the Shanta Creek Wildfire, which burned over 10,000 acres (4,000 ha) of Refuge land before it began moving toward populated areas outside of Soldotna and was aggressively fought to keep it from endangering these areas.

The Funny River Fire, a human-caused fire that began on 19 May 2014, had burned largely in the Kenai National Wildlife Refuge. During firefighting activities, a wolf den was damaged by a bulldozer and 5 pups (3 males and 2 females) were rescued by firefighters. The pups were taken to the Alaska Zoo and were later transferred to the Minnesota Zoo.

In 2019, lightning again ignited a major wildfire, named the Swan Lake Fire, and again it was allowed to burn unchecked for some time, until it began to threaten the communities of Sterling and Cooper Landing, as well the Sterling Highway and the Refuge's Skilak Lake Road, the only roads allowing access to towns on the lower Kenai Peninsula. In total 167,164 acres (67,649 ha) were burned before it was contained, but no structures were destroyed and there were no deaths.

== Gallery ==
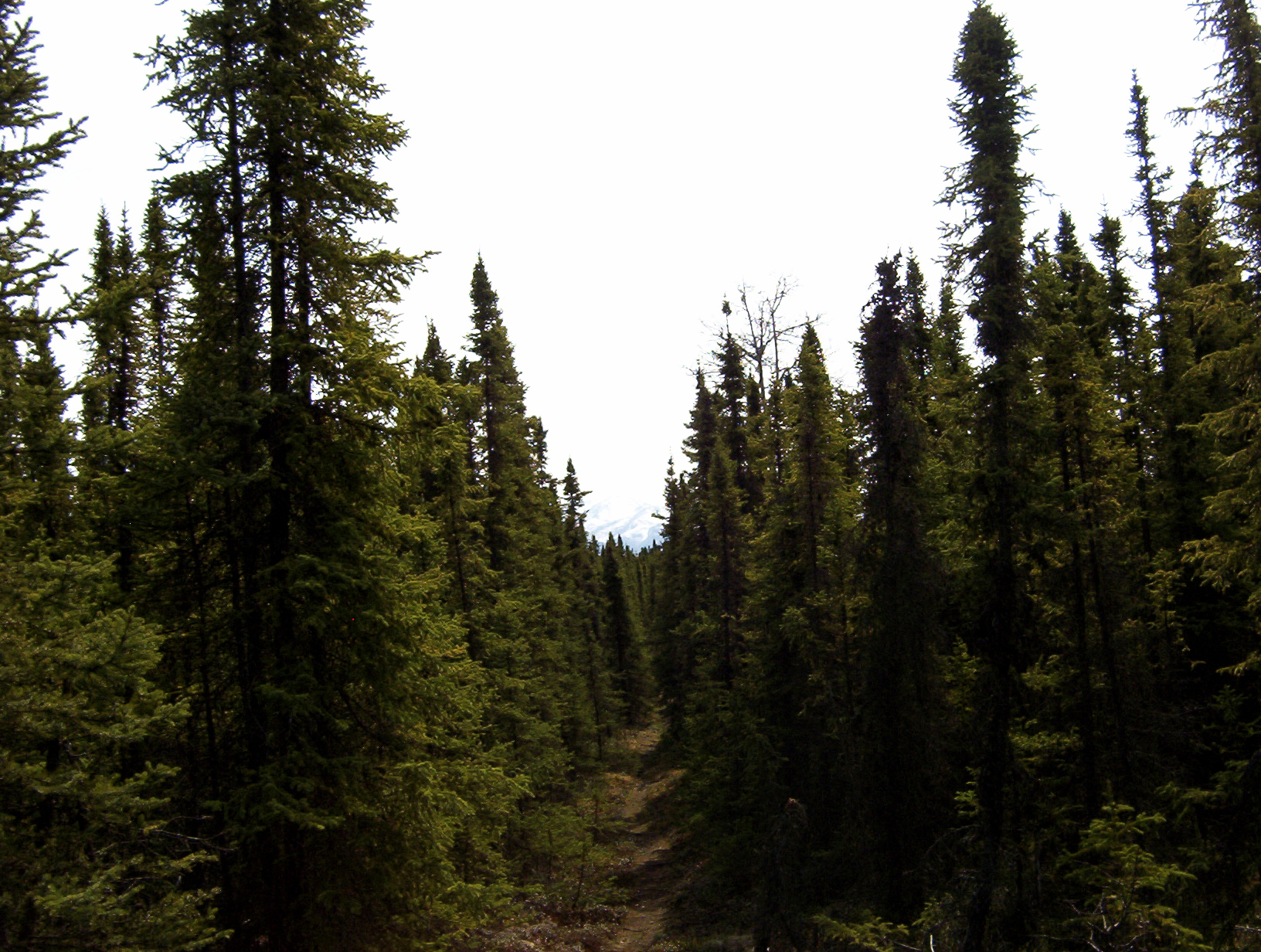
A taiga forest section of the Seven Lakes trail.

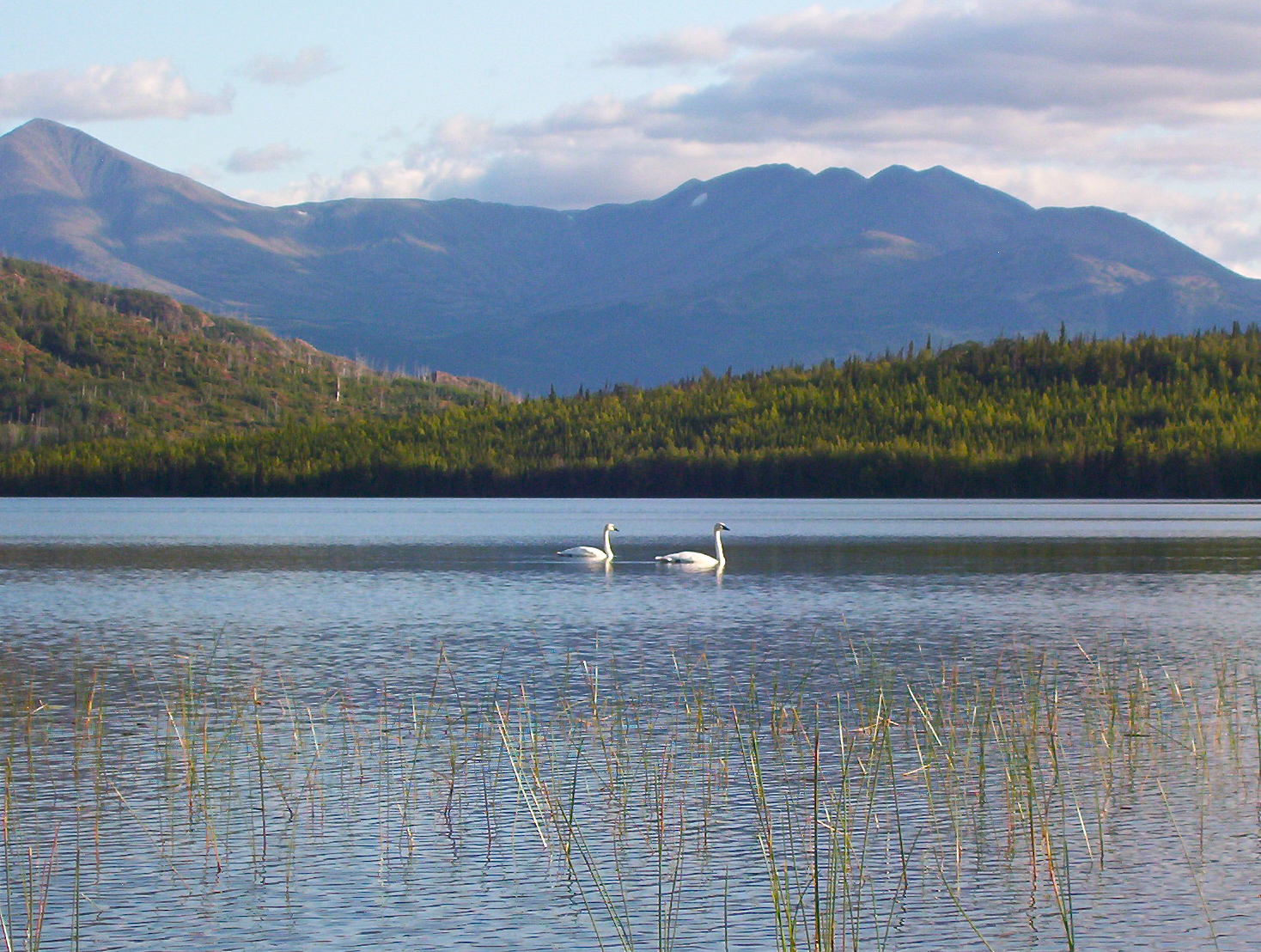
Trumpeter swans on Lower Ohmer Lake.

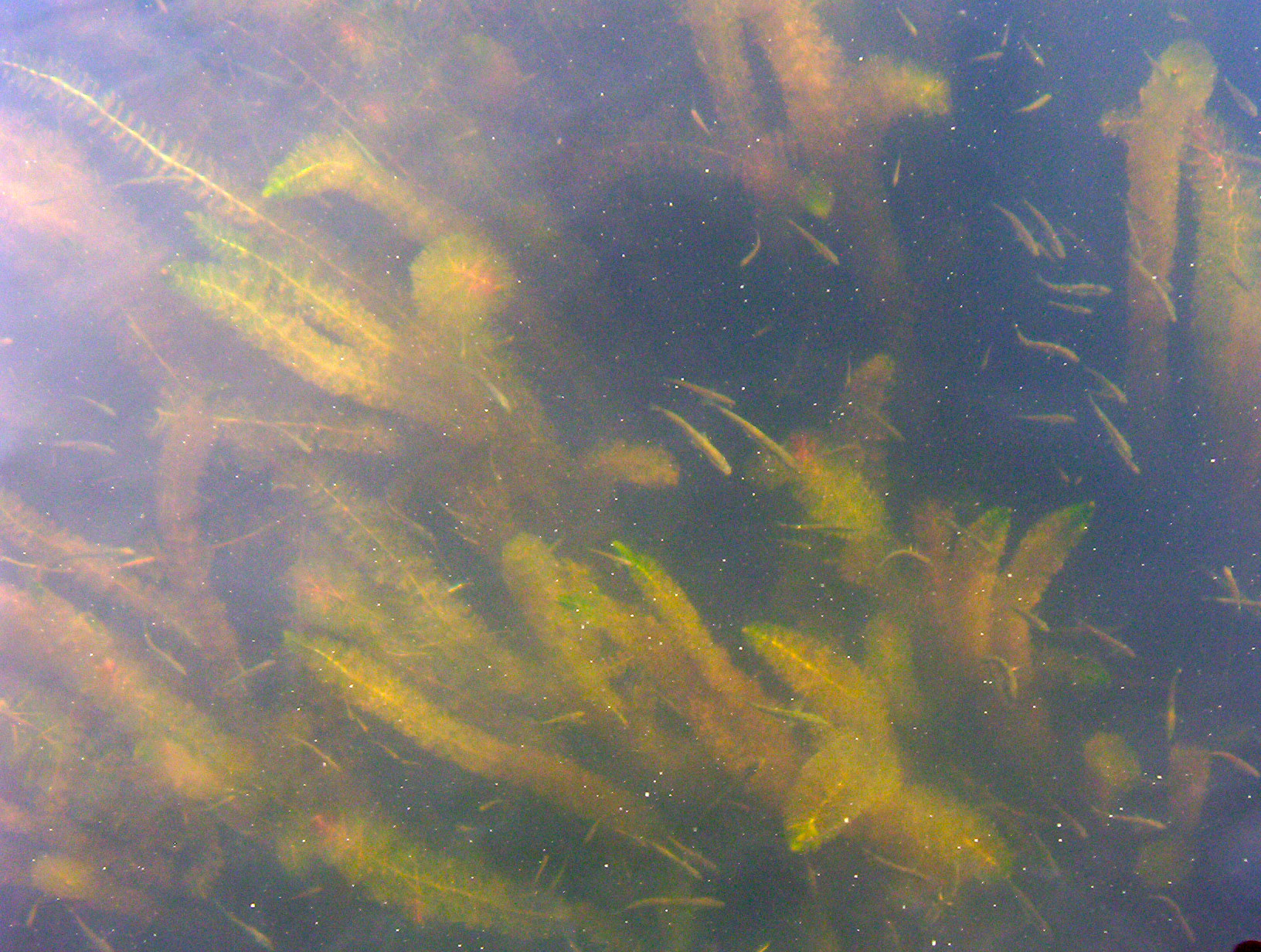
Dolly Varden and Rainbow trout fry in one of the refuge's many lakes.

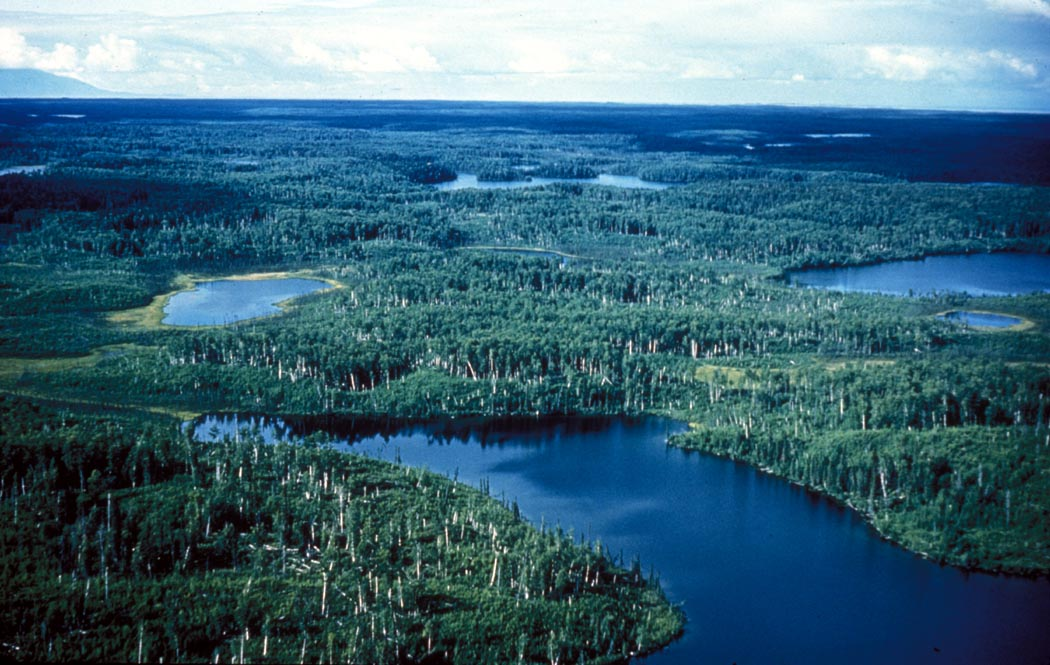
Lowland lakes.

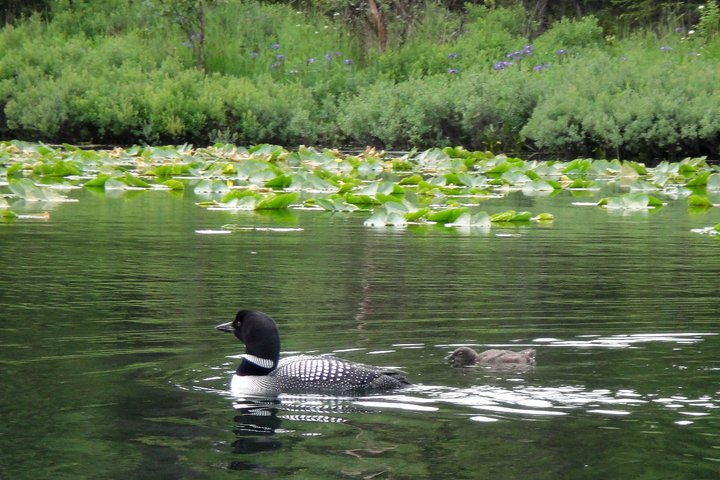
Common loon and chick

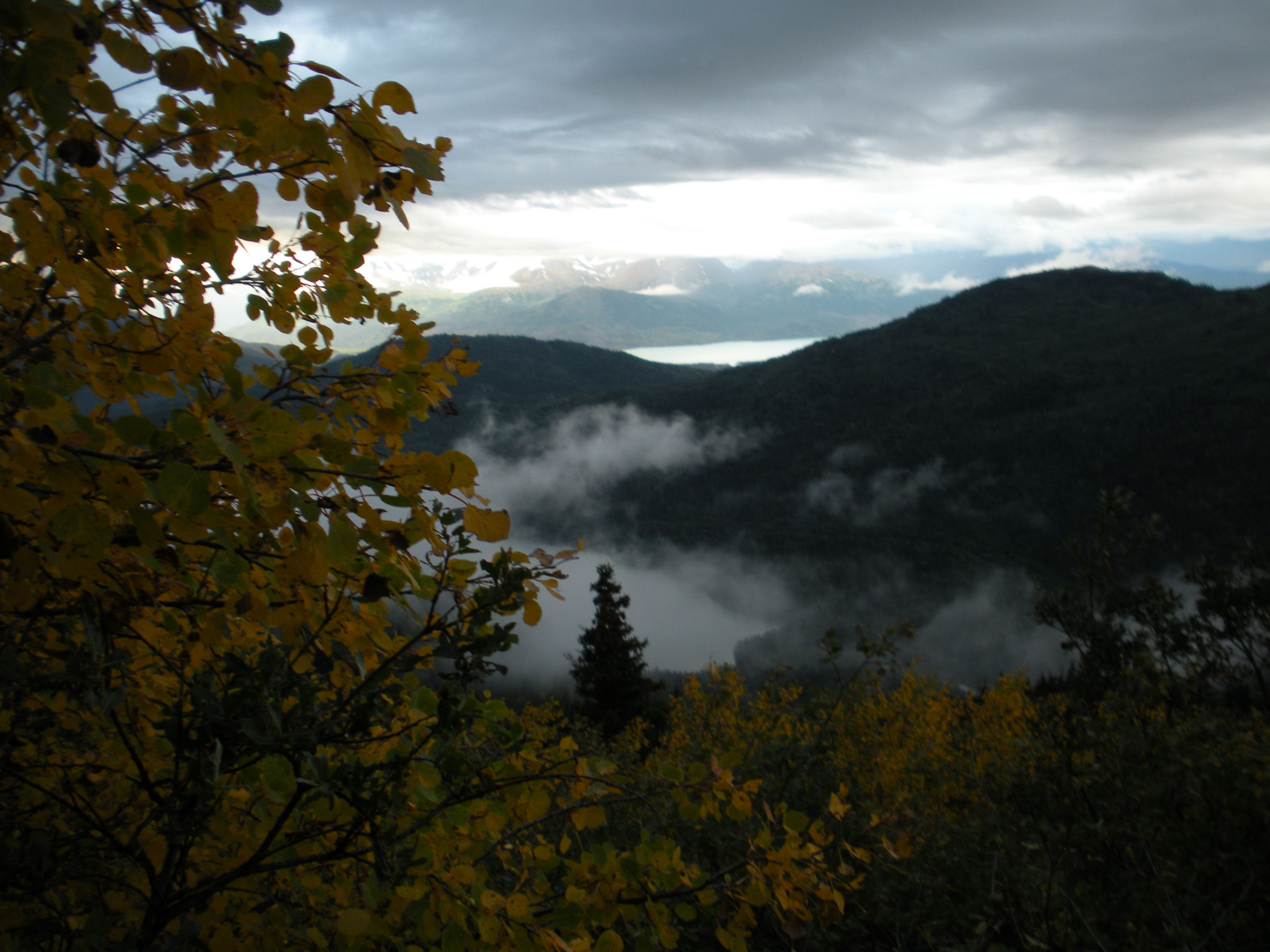
A view from Skyline Trail in the Kenai National Wildlife Refuge

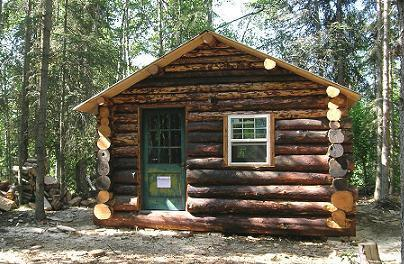
Big Indian Creek Cabin

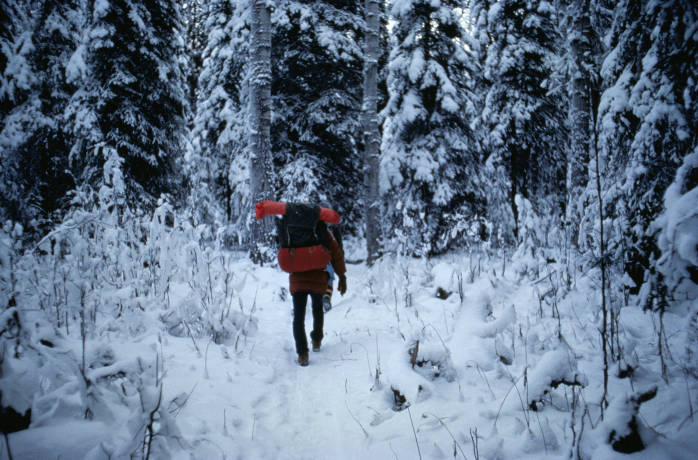
A hiker traverses a snow-covered trail within the Kenai National Wildlife Refuge

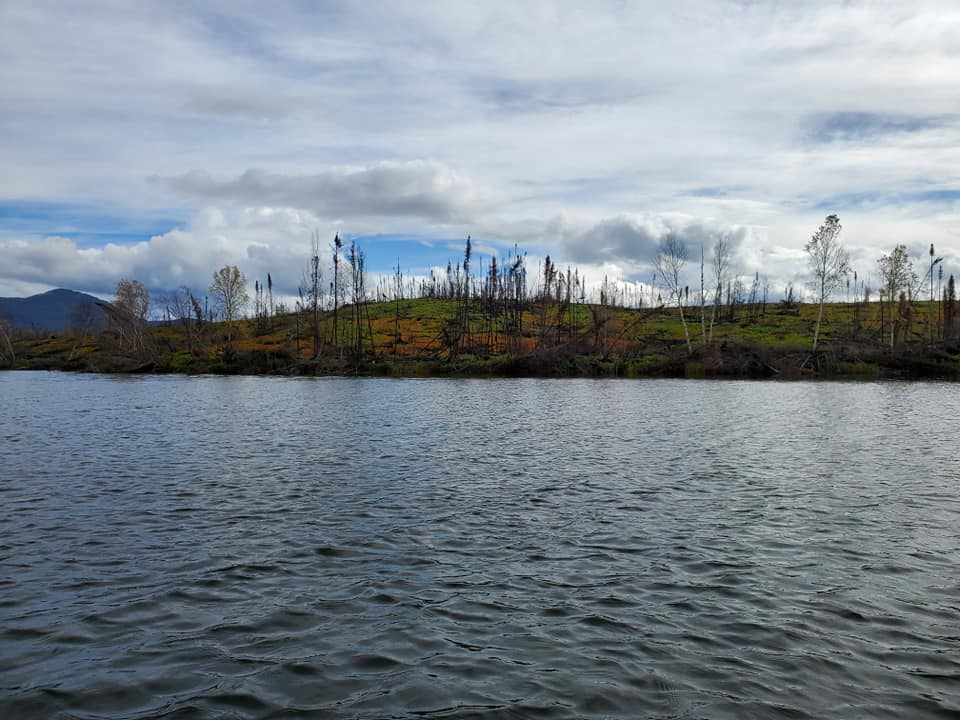
A hillside at Kelly Lake of spruce/birch taiga burned by the Swan Lake Fire

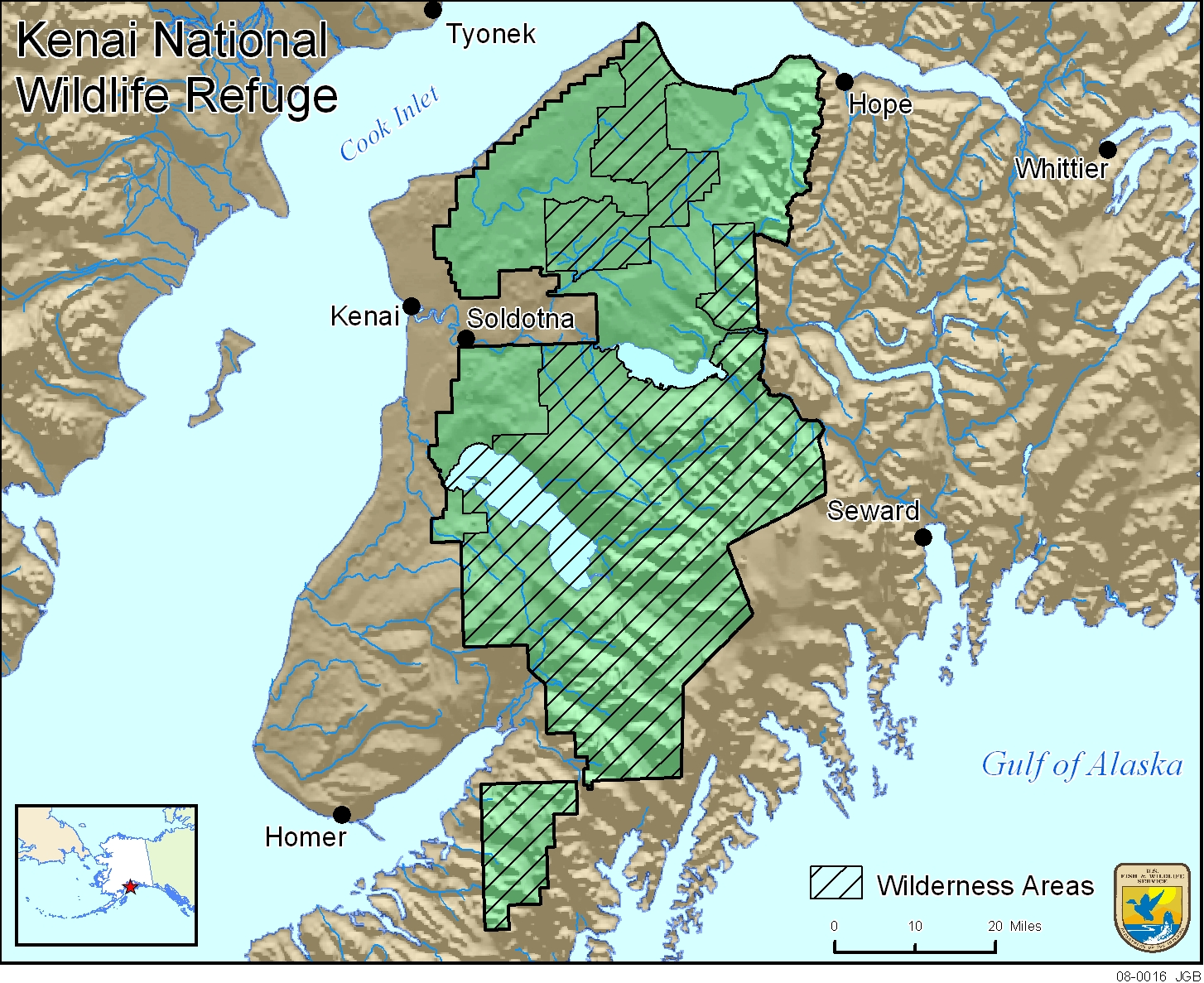
The Boundaries of the Refuge within the Kenai Peninsula

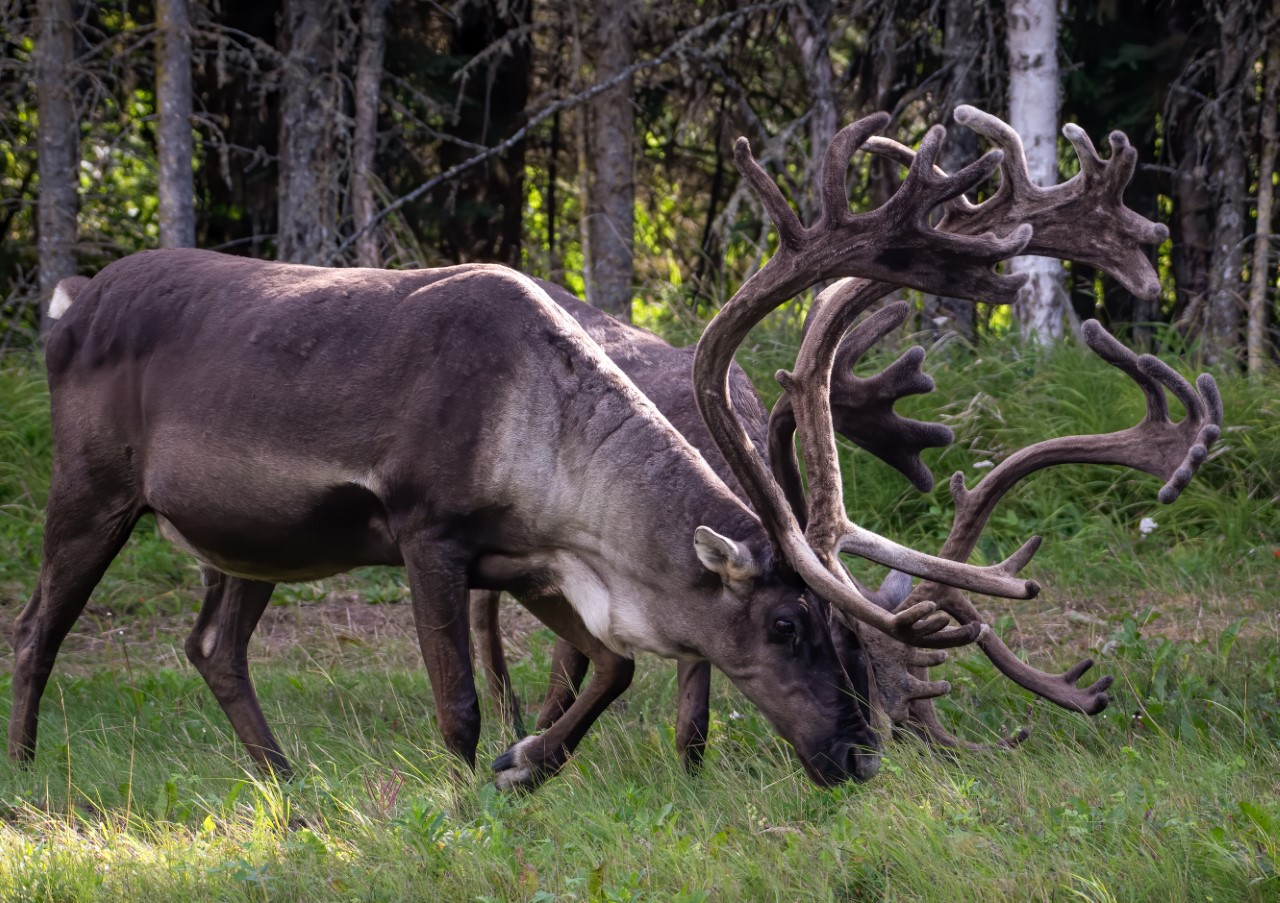
Grazing caribou
