= Skilak Lake =

Lake in Alaska, United States

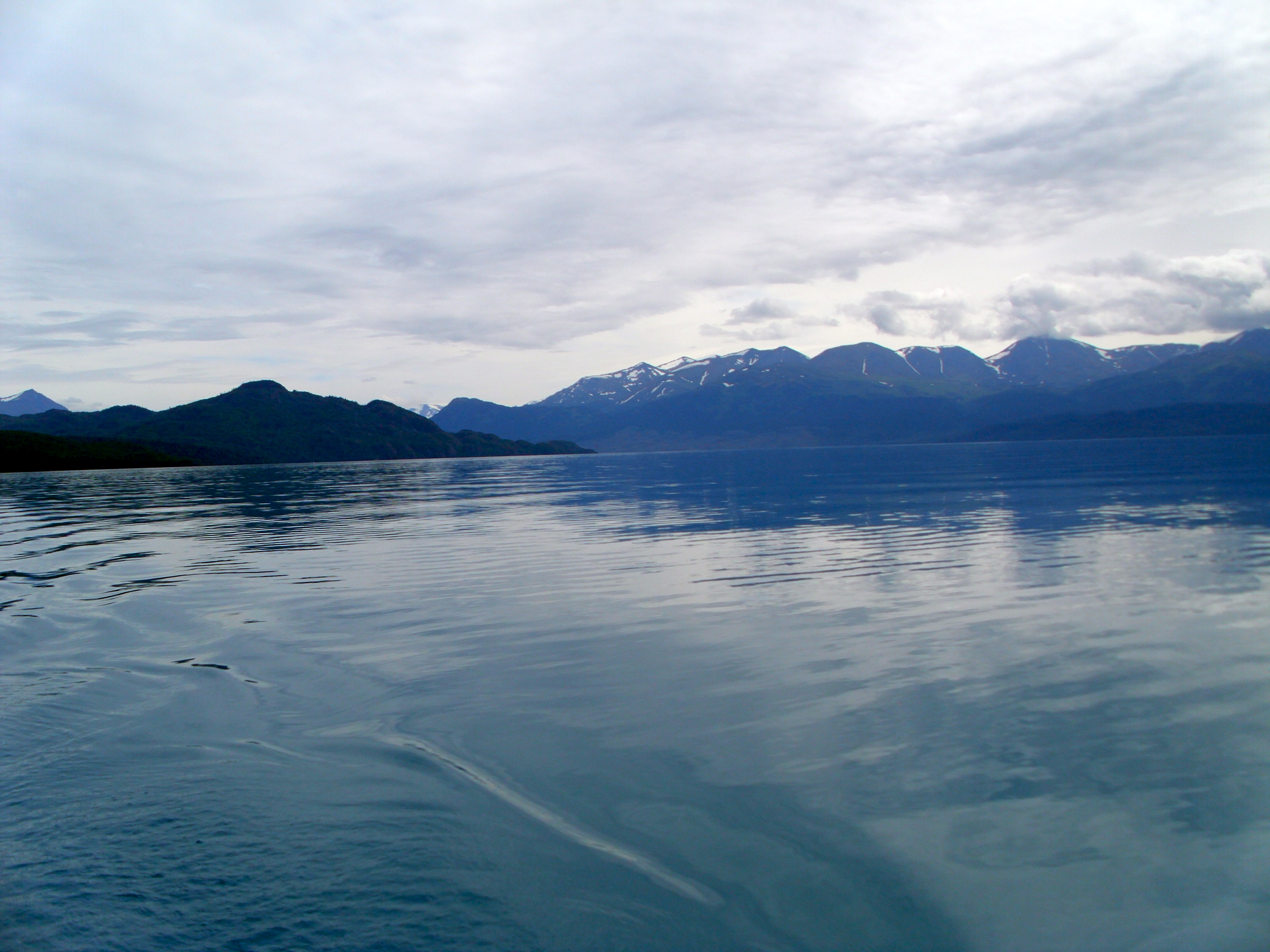

- Location within Alaska Location within North America
- Location: Kenai Peninsula, Alaska
- Coordinates: 60°24′59″N 150°20′02″W
- Primary inflows: Skilak River, Kenai River
- Primary outflows: Kenai River
- Basin countries: United States
- Max. length: 15 mi (24 km)
- Max. depth: 632 ft (193 m)
- Surface elevation: 194 ft (59 m)
- Frozen: late Nov.- late April
- Islands: Frying Pan Island, Caribou Island

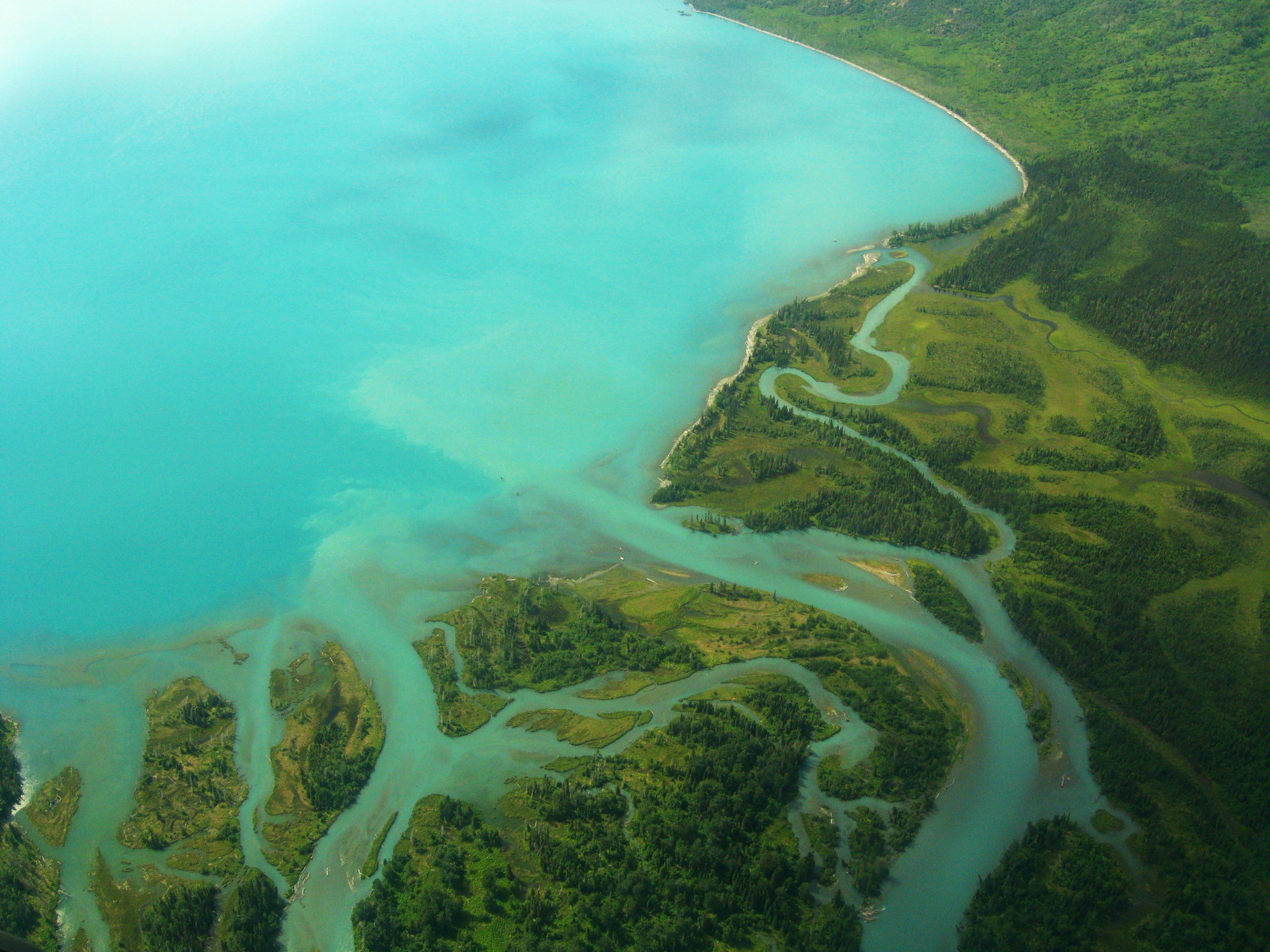
The turquoise water of Skilak Lake and the Kenai River delta, as seen from the air

Skilak Lake (Dena'ina: Q'es Dudilen Bena) is a large lake on the Kenai Peninsula, Alaska. The lake is part of the Kenai River system but also contains glacial runoff, being fed by meltwater from Skilak Glacier. The water is exceptionally clear with a mostly rocky bottom, relatively free of aquatic vegetation. It is within the Kenai National Wildlife Refuge, and can be accessed by Skilak Lake Loop Road via the Sterling Highway. Maximum depth is 632 feet (193 m), it is 15 miles (24 km) long and up to 4 miles (6.4 km) wide in places. Early Russian explorers mistakenly believed Skilak and Tustumena Lake to be a single body of water. It is a popular destination for Alaskans due to it being only about a half-hour drive from Soldotna, and approximately two hours from Anchorage. There are two campgrounds at the lake, one is a developed campground with a host, the other un-hosted and with only basic facilities. There are many well-developed and maintained trails along the lake and its access road, as well as campgrounds and public-access cabins.

== See also ==
- List of lakes of Alaska
