= Kenai River =

River in Alaska

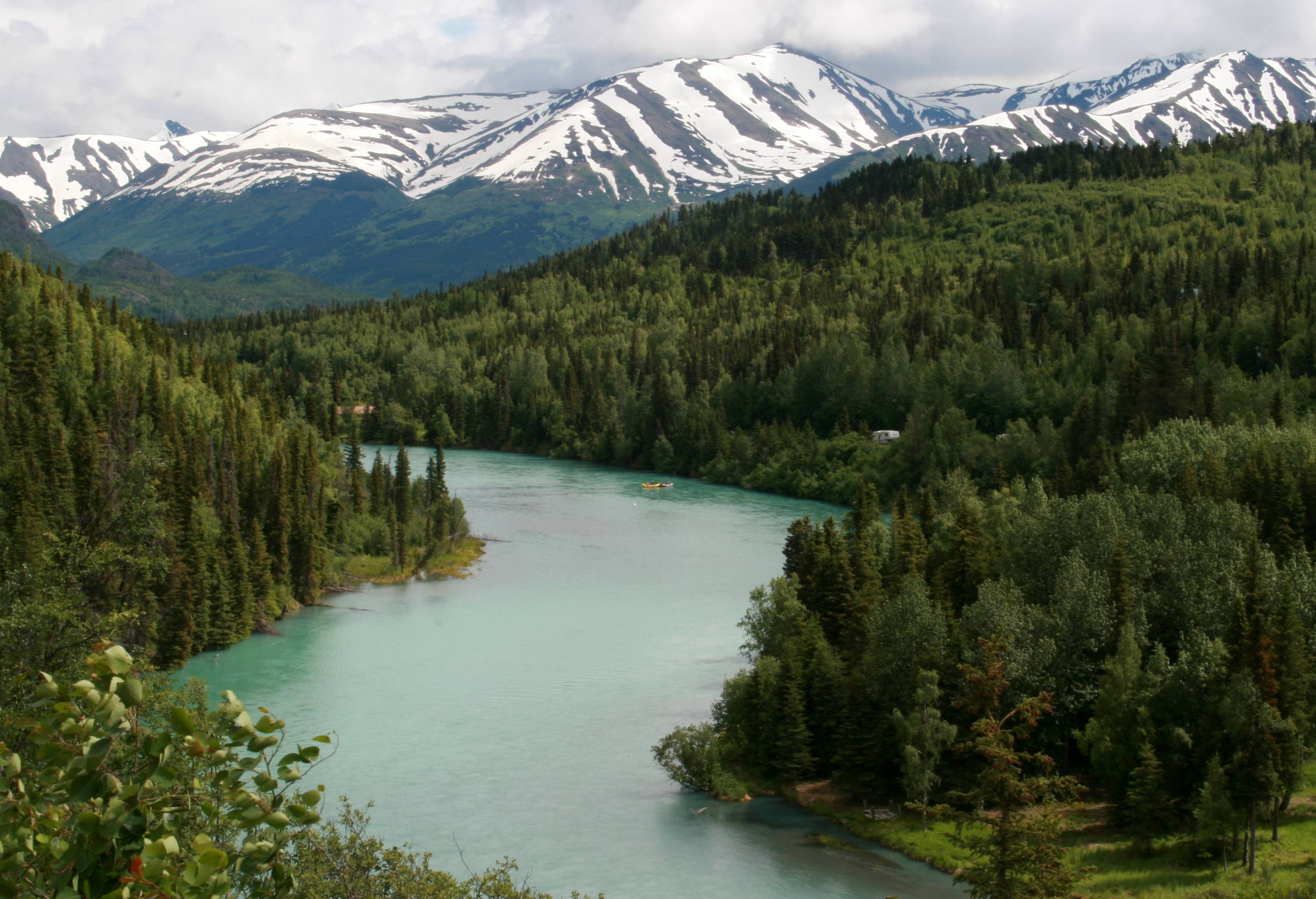
- The Kenai River at Cooper Landing, July 2008

Location
- Country: United States
- State: Alaska

Physical characteristics
- Source: Kenai Lake
- Mouth: Cook Inlet
  - location: Kenai
  - coordinates: 60°32′38″N 151°16′43″W
  - elevation: 0 m (0 ft)
- Length: 82 mi (132 km)
- Basin size: 2,010 mi^{2} (5,200 km^{2})
- Discharge
  - location: mouth
  - average: 5,922 cu ft/s (167.7 m^{3}/s)

Basin features
- Tributaries
  - left: Russian River, Killey River, Funny River
  - right: Moose River

The Kenai River called Kahtnu in the Dena'ina language, is the longest river in the Kenai Peninsula of southcentral Alaska. It runs 82 miles (132 km) westward from Kenai Lake in the Kenai Mountains, through the Kenai National Wildlife Refuge and Skilak Lake to its outlet into the Cook Inlet of the Pacific Ocean near Kenai and Soldotna.

== Geography ==
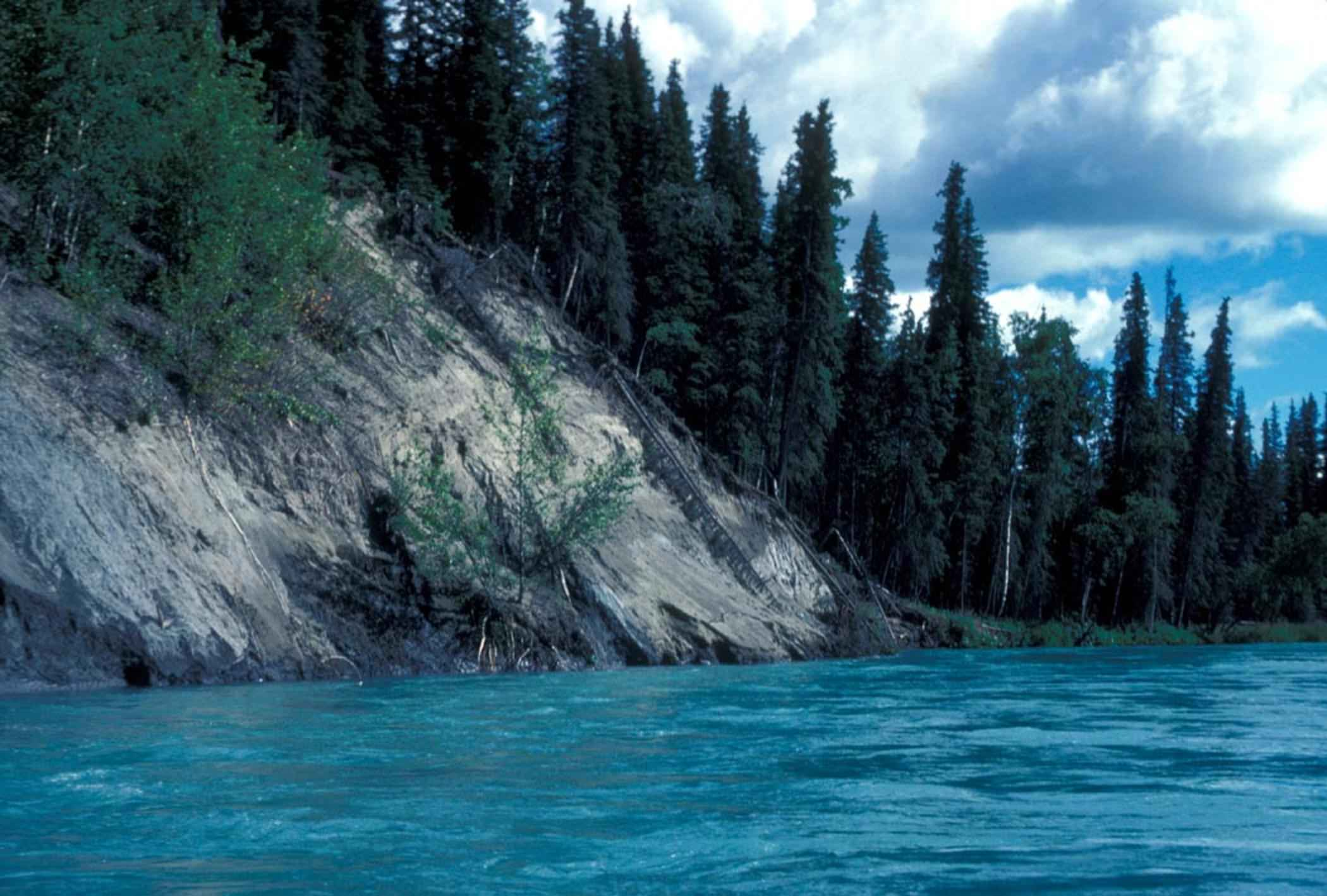
Kenai River bank

The Kenai River [Kee-nye] is a meltwater river that drains the central Kenai Peninsula region. Its source is the Kenai Lake. Near Cooper Landing, the lake narrows to form the river. About 12 miles (19 km) from the lake, the river passes through Kenai Canyon for about 2 miles (3.2 km) of fast-flowing whitewater rapids. The Russian River empties into the Kenai several miles west of Cooper Landing. Seventeen point three miles (27.8 km) from Kenai Lake, the river enters Skilak Lake. The Kenai Lake to Skilak section is commonly referred to as the "Upper River". The 19.5 miles (31.4 km) portion from Skilak Lake downstream to the Sterling Highway bridge near Soldotna is known as "Middle River". The final 21 miles (34 km) from the bridge to the mouth at Cook Inlet is known as the "Lower River", where the flow is much gentler. The final 12 miles (19 km) are greatly influenced by changing tides.

== Fish ==
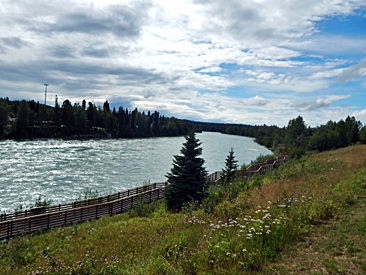
The Kenai River running past Soldotna Creek Park in downtown Soldotna, June 2013

The Kenai River is the most popular sport fishing destination in Alaska, particularly for king salmon (Chinook salmon). Each year there are two runs each of king salmon, coho salmon, sockeye salmon, plus a run of pink salmon every other year. The world record king salmon, which weighed about 44 kg (97 lb), was caught in the Kenai River in 1985. The Kenai is also the home of trophy size rainbow trout and Dolly Varden, with some reaching lengths of over 76.2 cm (30 inches). Occasionally anglers report catching "Steelhead" (Sea-run Rainbow Trout) in the Kenai River. In total, the Kenai River provides habitat to 40 different fish species.

The king salmon fishery is not as prolific as in other Alaskan rivers, but the Kenai is known for its large fish. A typical king in the second run, beginning in mid-July, weighs 40–85 pounds (18–23 kg), with considerably larger specimens not uncommon. The "Lower Kenai" is well known for its run and sizes of its king salmon. In recent years, the king salmon fishery has been closed or heavily restricted due to low returns of fish.

The coho salmon runs occur in early August and early October. The September run is favored by local anglers due to the larger size of the silver salmon.

The sockeye salmon runs are in late-June (bluebacks) and early-August. Sockeyes are considered the premier salmon for eating, canning, and smoking.

The pink salmon run occurs in even numbered years only. These fish are considered pests by many anglers because they interfere with catching other species and because, by the time they reach inland freshwater, their meat may be soft and oily compared to other species. On a heavy day, even a casual fisher might catch several dozen of the species.

== Other wildlife ==
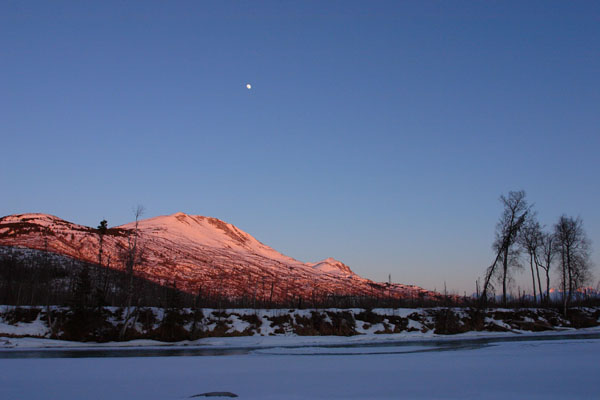
The Kenai in winter, March 2007

Along with Kenai's fish, the Kenai River area is home to other wildlife, including moose, bears, eagles and multiple species of birds.

== Management ==
Over 105 miles (169 km) of the river and lakes are managed by the Alaska Department of Natural Resources as the Kenai River Special Management Area, from 4 miles (6.4 km) inland of the river mouth at Cook Inlet, to 82 miles (132 km) upstream. Adjacent to the management district are fifteen different parks.

== See also ==
- List of rivers of Alaska
