= Spruce bark beetle =

Spruce bark beetle is a common name for several insects and may refer to:

- Dendroctonus micans, the great spruce bark beetle
- Ips typographus, the European spruce bark beetle

== See also ==
- Spruce beetle
