= Kenai Peninsula =

Large peninsula in south central Alaska, United States

Coordinates: 60°10′N 150°15′W

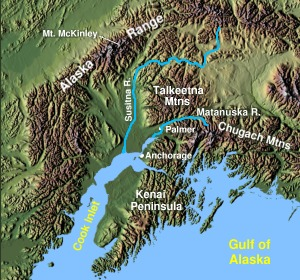
The Kenai Peninsula in Alaska

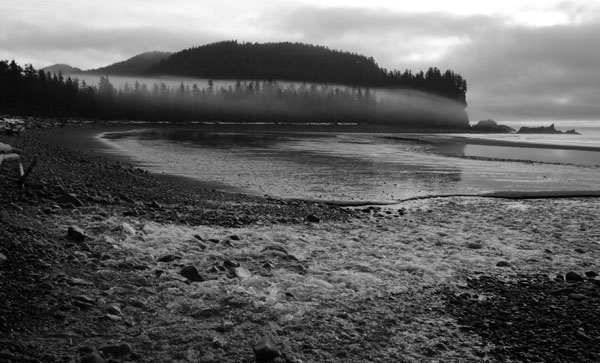
Kenai Peninsula Outer Coast

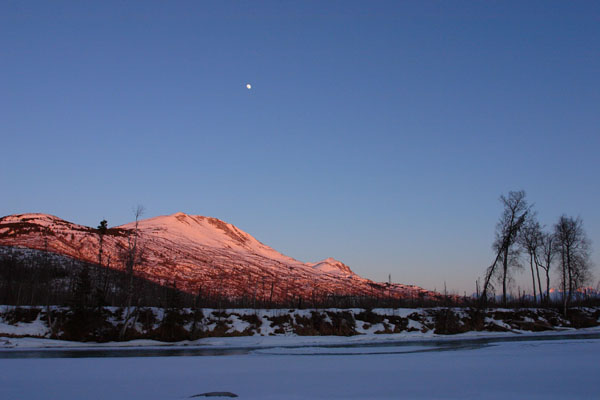
Kenai River

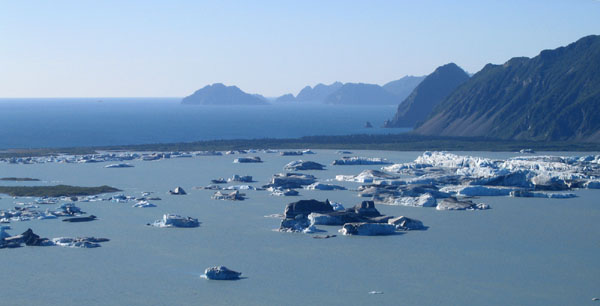
Kenai Peninsula Bear Glacier Lake and Pacific Ocean

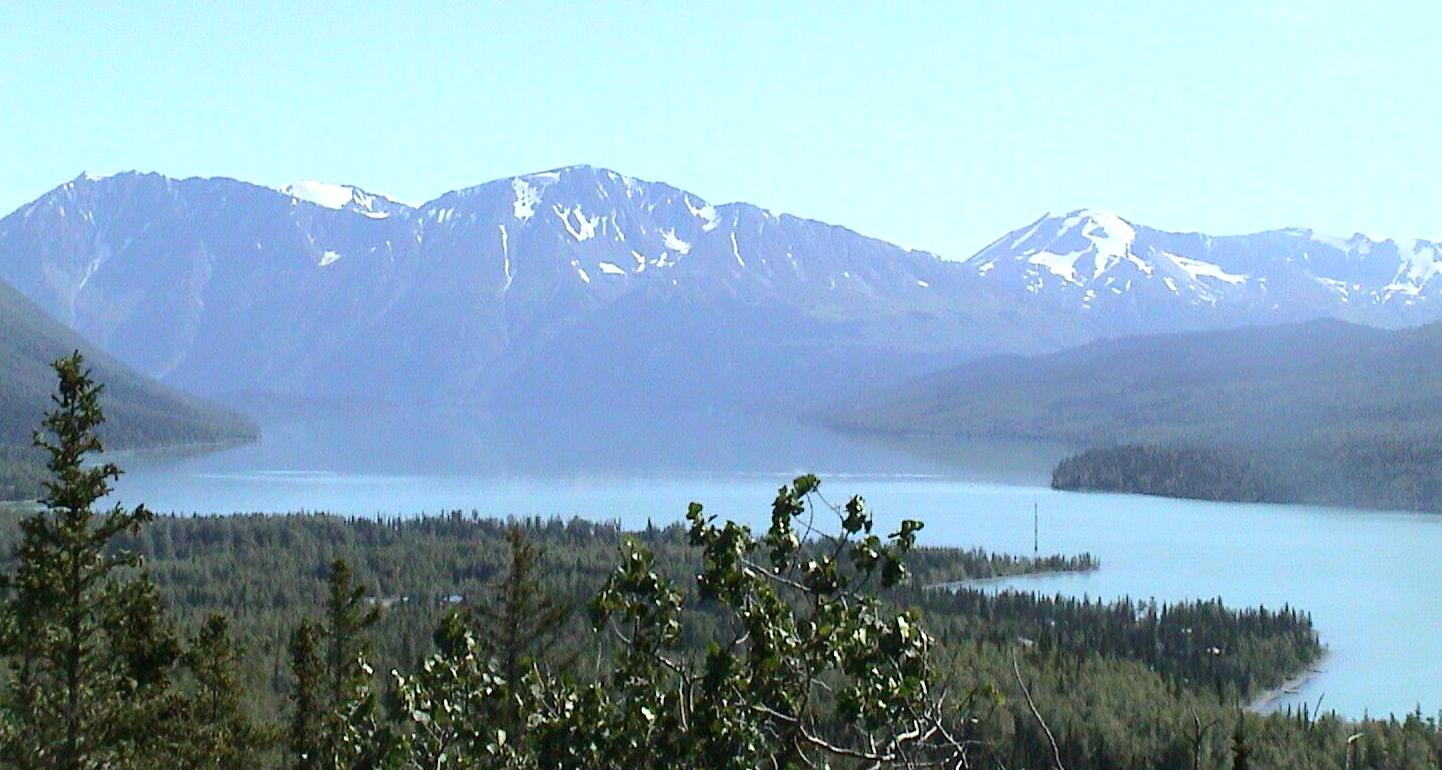
The Kenai River and Mountains, August 2003

The Kenai Peninsula (Dena'ina: Yaghenen) is a large peninsula jutting from the coast of Southcentral Alaska. The name Kenai (/ˈkiːnaɪ/, KEE-ny) is derived from the word "Kenaitze" or "Kenaitze Indian Tribe", the name of the Native Athabascan Alaskan tribe, the Kahtnuht’ana Dena’ina ("People along the Kahtnu (Kenai River)"), who historically inhabited the area. They called the Kenai Peninsula Yaghanen ("the good land").

== Geography ==
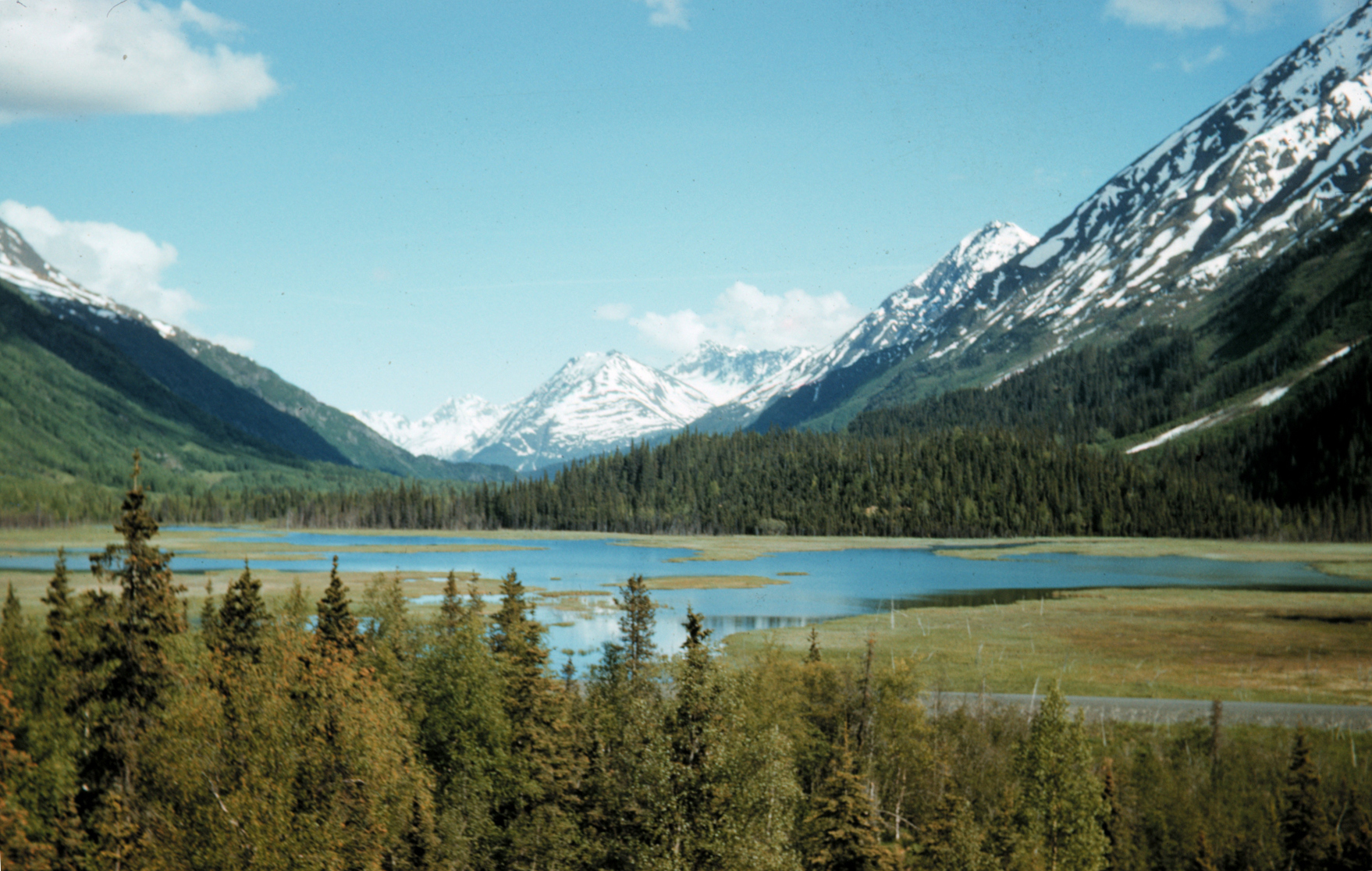
Tern Lake is located at the intersection of the two major roads for accessing the peninsula.

The peninsula extends about 150 miles (240 km) southwest from the Chugach Mountains, south of Anchorage. It is separated from the mainland on the west by Cook Inlet and on the east by Prince William Sound. Most of the peninsula is part of the Kenai Peninsula Borough. Athabaskan and Alutiiq Native groups lived on the peninsula for thousands of years prior to colonization during the Russian America era.

The glacier-covered Kenai Mountains run along the southeast spine of the peninsula along the coast of the Gulf of Alaska. Much of the range is within Kenai Fjords National Park. The northwest coast along the Cook Inlet is flatter, dotted with numerous small lakes. Several larger lakes extend through the interior of the peninsula, including Skilak Lake and Tustumena Lake. Rivers include the Kenai River, renowned for king salmon fishing, and its tributary, the Russian River, the Kasilof River, and the Anchor River. Kachemak Bay, an inlet off the larger Cook Inlet, extends into the peninsula's southwest end, much of which is part of Kachemak Bay State Park.

It is home to both the Sargent Icefield and Harding Icefields and the numerous glaciers assosciated with them, including Tustumena Glacier, Exit Glacier, and McCarty Glacier.

== Towns and cities ==
The peninsula includes several of the most populous towns in Southcentral Alaska, including Seward on the Gulf of Alaska Coast, Soldotna, Kenai, Sterling, and Cooper Landing along the Cook Inlet and Kenai River, and Homer, along Kachemak Bay, along with numerous smaller villages and settlements.

== Transportation ==
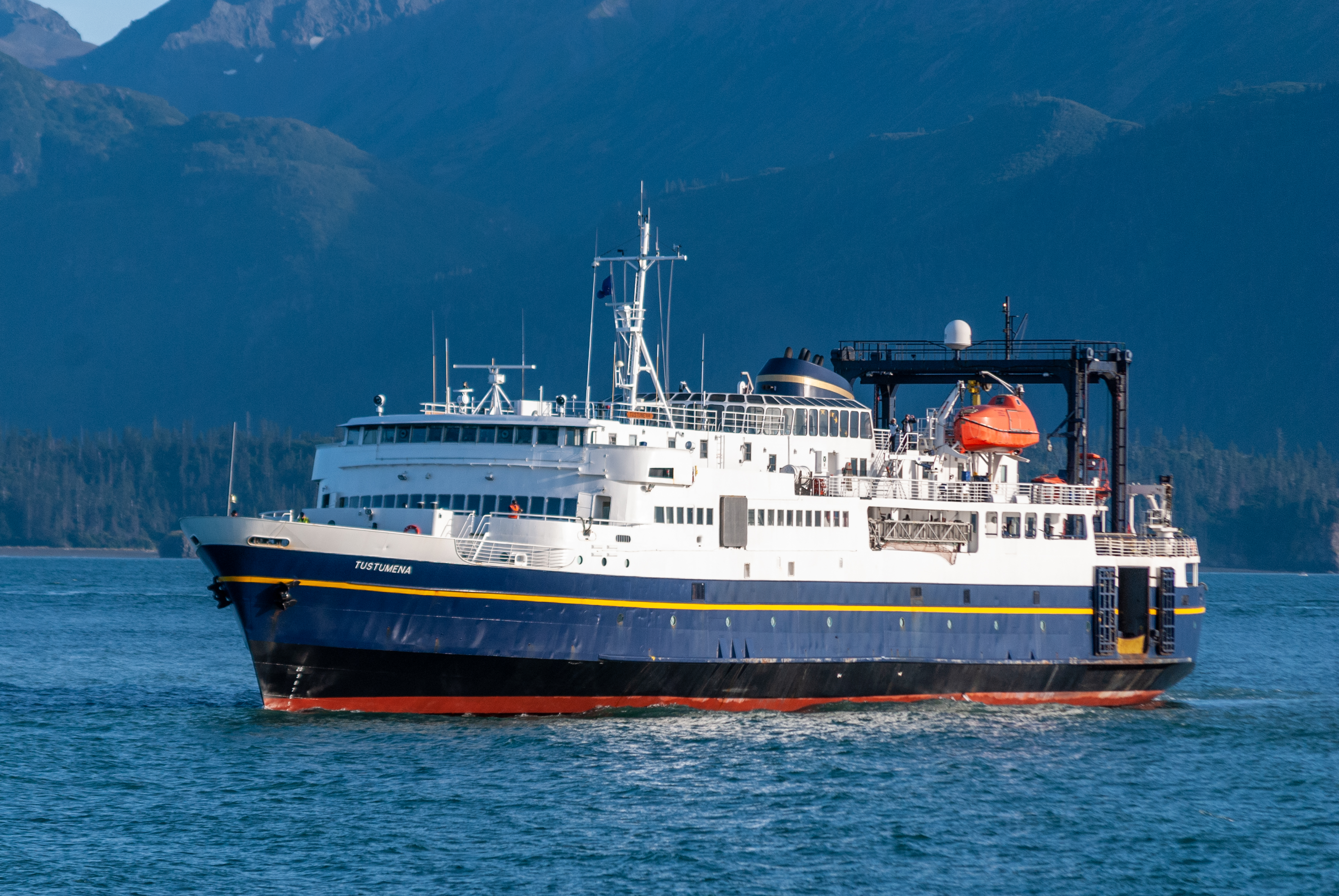
The ferry Tustumena approaching Homer

Homer marks the terminus of the paved highway system of North America, while nearby Anchor Point is the most westerly point on the contiguous highway system. Seward is the southern terminus of the Alaska Railroad. The Seward Highway connects Seward to Anchorage, while the Sterling Highway connects the large population centers to the Seward Highway. The Kenai Spur Highway connects Soldotna, Kenai, Nikiski and Captain Cook State Recreation Area,

Commercial airports with service to Anchorage are located in Kenai and Homer. Smaller airports are located in Soldotna, Seward, and Seldovia.

The Alaska Marine Highway services Homer and Seldovia. Seward is a major cruise ship port.

== Natural resources and economy ==
The peninsula also has natural gas, petroleum, and coal deposits, as well as abundant commercial and personal-use fisheries. Tourism is a major industry, along with outfitting and guiding services for hunters and fishers. The Kenai Peninsula is known as "Alaska's Playground". Kenai National Wildlife Refuge encompasses nearly two million acres of the peninsula.
