= Murder of Anesha Murnane =

2019 missing person case in the United States

Anesha Murnane
- Image that was widely distributed during the efforts to find Murnane; she was wearing the same blue jacket on the day she disappeared
- Born: August 12, 1981
- Disappeared: October 17, 2019 (aged 38); Homer, Alaska, U.S.

On October 17, 2019, Anesha "Duffy" Murnane disappeared from Pioneer Avenue, the main thoroughfare of Homer, Alaska, in the middle of the day while walking to a medical appointment. The case remained unsolved until a tip led investigators to arrest a man in Ogden, Utah for the rape and murder of Murnane.

== Disappearance ==
Murnane resided at a small supportive housing facility in Homer. She left the building on foot at shortly after noon on October 17, 2019, headed for a local clinic, but she never arrived. She was not officially reported missing until the 19th. Search dogs were used to track her movements, they determined she apparently got into a vehicle on Pioneer Avenue. An air search was conducted, and volunteers conducted searches and went door-to-door over the next several months.

== Investigation ==
When initial efforts to locate Murnane were not successful, the Homer Police Department hired a special investigator for the sole purpose of continuing to try and determine what happened to her. The FBI also assisted in aspects of the investigation. Several persons of interest were interviewed over the course of the next two years, including the person eventually charged with abducting and murdering Murnane, but there was not sufficient cause to make an arrest. Dateline NBC profiled the case as part of their "Missing in America" series in February 2020.

== Perpetrator’s arrest and conviction ==
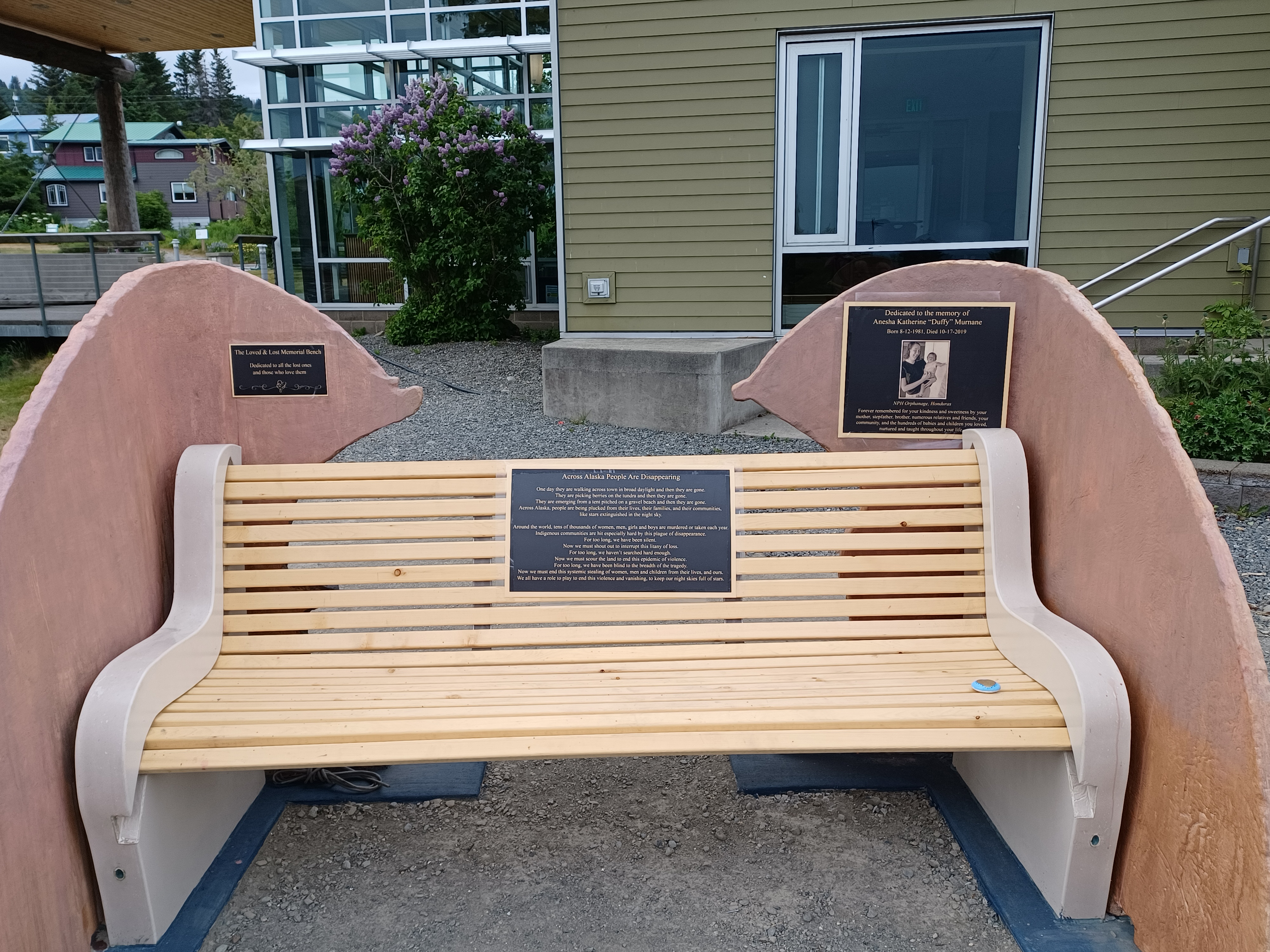
The "Loved and Lost" memorial bench at Homer Public Library, dedicated to Murnane and other missing/murdered Alaskans and their loved ones

In April 2022, an anonymous call to a tip line identified a Utah man, Kirby Calderwood, who had formerly lived in Homer, as the person who abducted, raped, and murdered Murnane, and gave numerous details about the crime. Calderwood knew Murnane due to being employed by a local behavioral health service and having worked at the building where Murnane lived. He was arrested in Utah in May 2022. Subsequent interviews led to the discovery that the anonymous tip came from Calderwood’s wife, whom he had told about the murder in 2021. Upon executing search warrants, police recovered what appears to be Murnane's Timex watch, found near a missing person flyer.

In September 2022, a Kenai grand jury indicted Calderwood on multiple felony charges including murder, kidnapping, and sexual assault. He remained in Utah, where he was also facing charges, before being extradited to Alaska and incarcerated at the Wildwood Correctional Complex in November 2022. In February 2026, Calderwood admitted to killing Murnane and pleaded guilty to one count of second-degree murder. He signed a plea agreement recommending he receive a sentence of 87 years in prison, and was sentenced to that term in July 2026.

Friends, family, and investigators who worked on the case expressed frustration at the long period of time it took to arrest and convict Calderwood.

== See also ==
- List of kidnappings
- List of solved missing person cases (2010s)
