= Eva Saulitis =

American marine biologist (1963–2016)

- Born: Eva Lucia Saulitis; May 10, 1963; The Bronx, New York
- Died: January 16, 2016 (aged 52); Homer, Alaska
- Occupations: Marine biologist, poet

Eva Lucia Saulitis (Latvian: Eva Lūcija Saulītis; May 10, 1963 – January 16, 2016) was an American marine biologist, environmentalist, and poet, based in Homer, Alaska.

== Early life and education ==
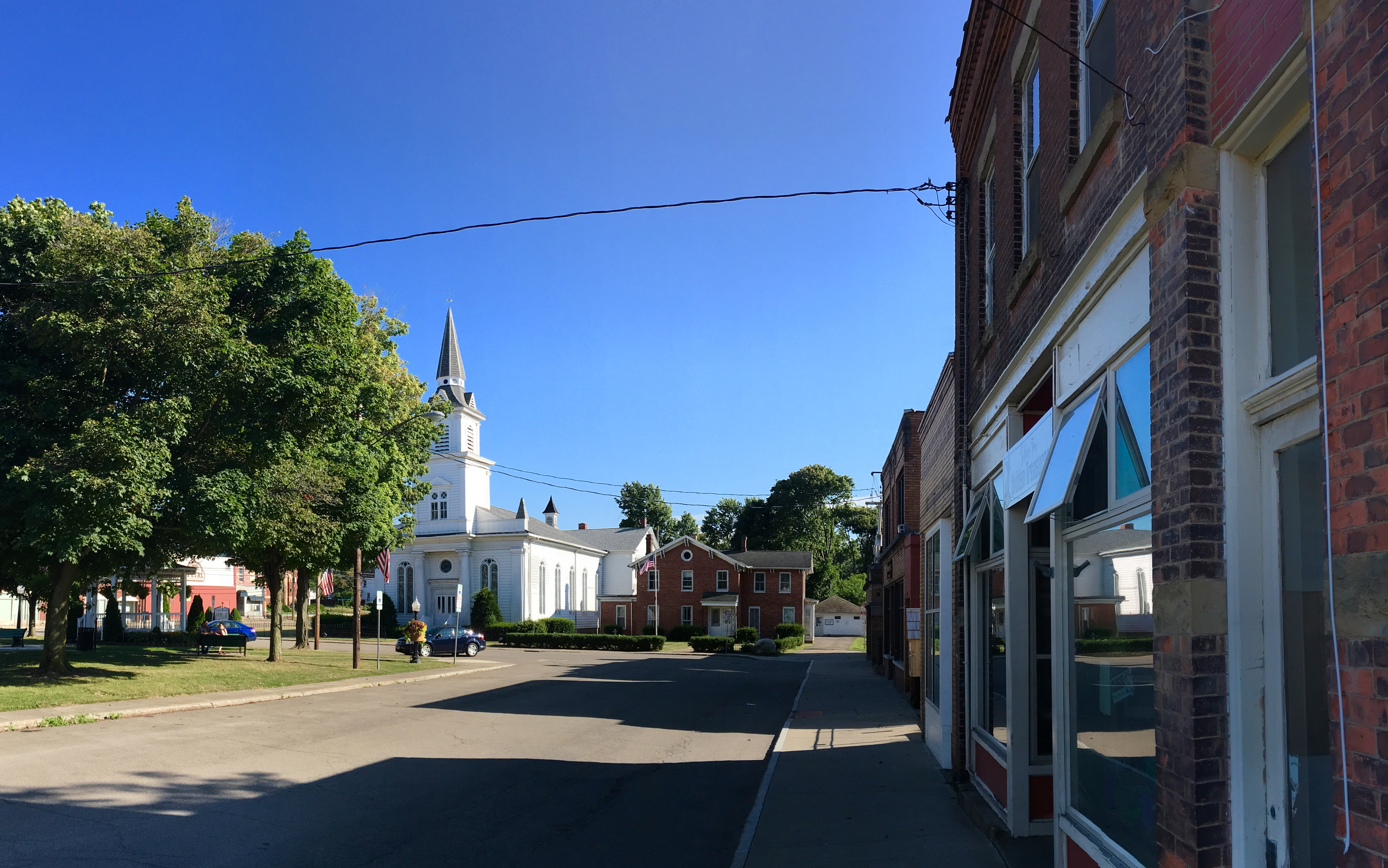
Silver Creek, New York

Saulitis was born in the Bronx and raised in Silver Creek, New York, the daughter of Latvian immigrants Jānis (John) Saulītis and Asja Saulītis (née Īviņš/Īviņa). While living in Silver Creek, she attended Silver Creek Central School. After graduating in 1981, she studied oboe at Northwestern University on a music scholarship. However, she did not like the program, as she said it was "competitive and strenuous." After attending for one year, she changed schools and majors to study ecology at the State University of New York at Fredonia, and later completed a bachelor's degree in environmental science at Syracuse SUNY ESF (Environmental Science and Forestry). She earned a master's degree in marine biology at the University of Alaska Fairbanks in 1993, and a second master's degree from the same institute in creative writing in 1999.

== Scientific career and research ==
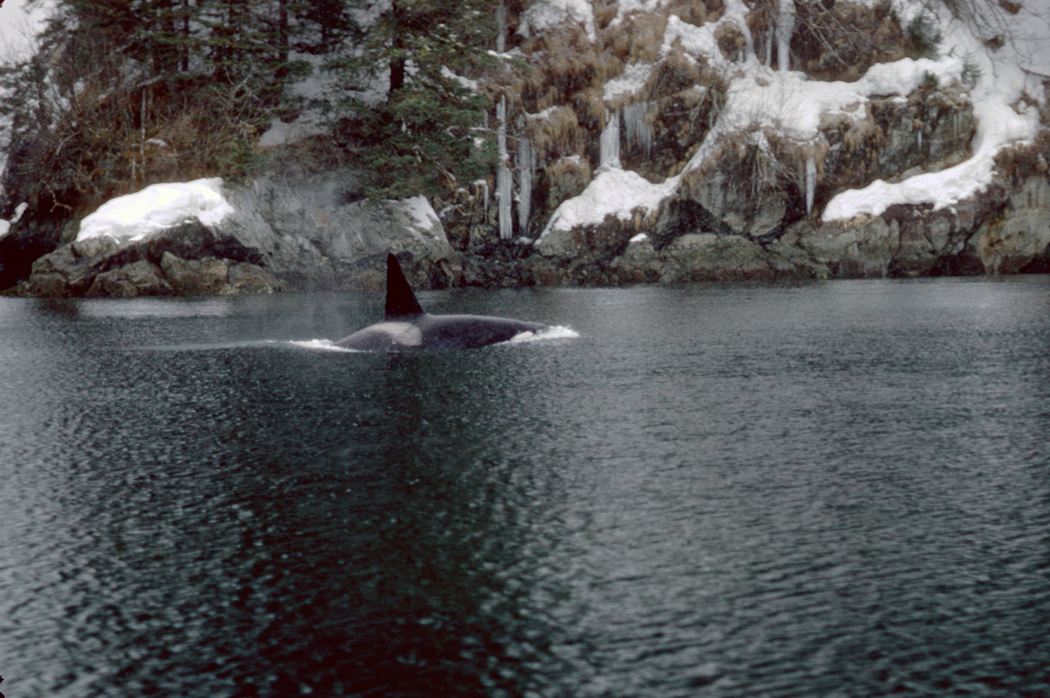
Orca in Prince William Sound.

After moving to Alaska, Saulitis began working a fisheries job in Prince William Sound, located in the Gulf of Alaska. She studied pods of orcas (also known as "killer whales") with the help of Craig Matkin, a zoologist, fisherman, and orca researcher who she eventually married. For twenty-eight years, the two of them studied the Chugach transients, a threatened species of orca. Saulitis tracked, recorded, and photographed these endangered orcas to document and establish a comprehensive database of their vocal patterns, identities, and lineages.

She was involved in impact studies and restoration efforts following the 1989 Exxon Valdez oil spill, specifically focusing on the environmental impacts the spill had on Prince William Sound. This spill hit the at-risk Chugach transients hard, as their population has not recovered, and the number or orcas in this area continue to dwindle.

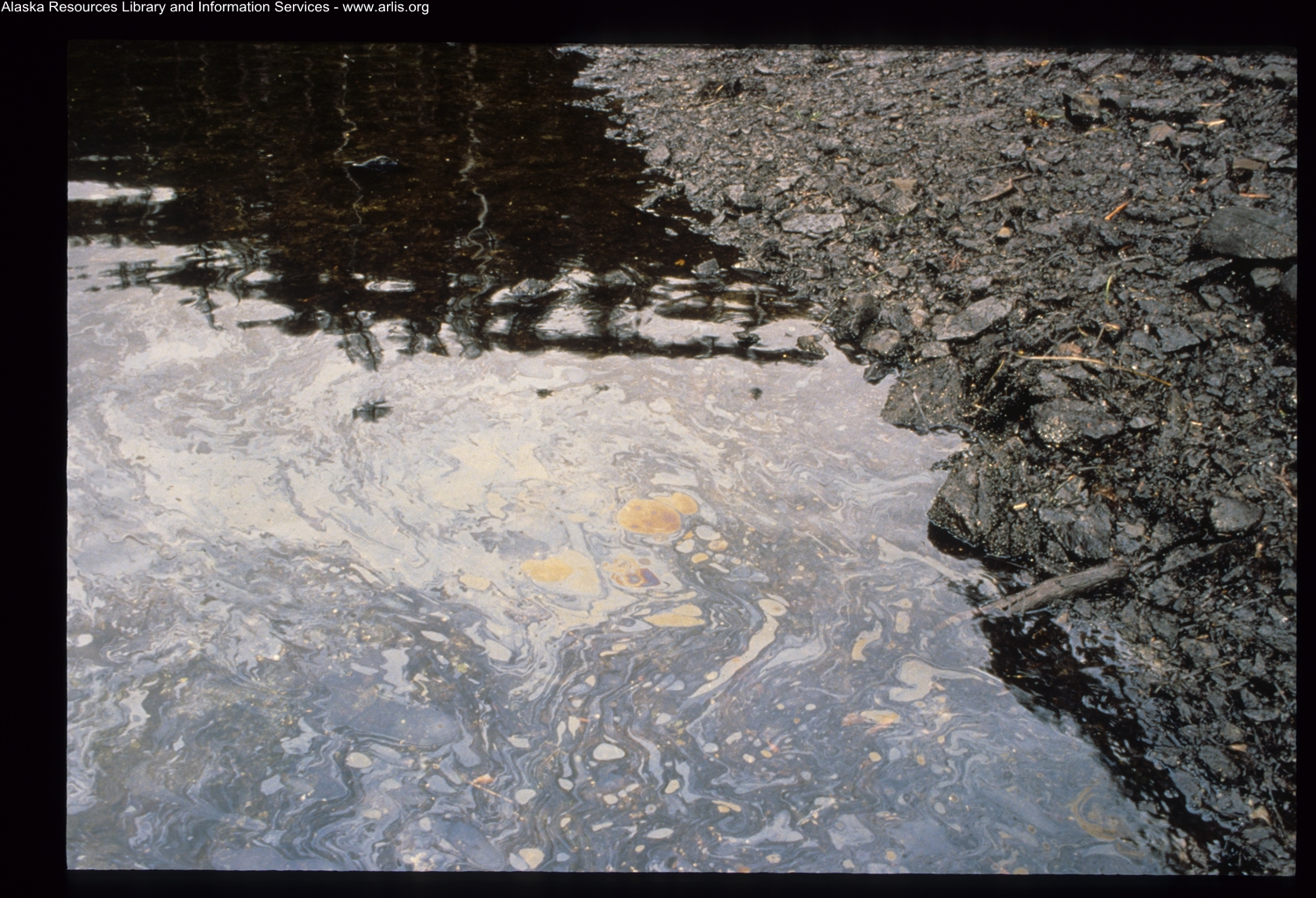
Oil polluting water in Prince William Sound.

== Scientific publications ==
=== Marine biology ===
- "Foraging Strategies of Sympatric Killer Whale (Orcinis orca) Populations in Prince William Sound, Alaska" (2000, with Craig Matkin, Lance Barrett-Lennard, Kathy Heise, and Graeme Ellis)
- "Distribution of Killer Whale Pods in Prince William Sound, Alaska, 1984-1996" (2001, with D. Scheel and Craig Matkin)
- "Examining the evidence for killer whale predation on Steller sea lions in British Columbia and Alaska" (2003, with Kathy Heise, Lance Barrett-Lennard, Craig Matkin and David Bain)
- "Vocal repertoire and acoustic behavior of the isolated AT1 killer whale subpopulation in southern Alaska" (2005, with Craig Matkin and Francis H. Fay)
- "Predation on gray whales and prolonged feeding on submerged carcasses by transient killer whales at Unimak Island, Alaska" (2011, with Lance Barrett-Lennard, Craig Matkin, John W. Durban, and David Ellifrit)
- "Life history and population dynamics of southern Alaska resident killer whales (Orcinus orca )" (2014, with Craig Matkin, J. Ward Testa, and Graeme Ellis)

== Literary background and publications ==
Her published works combine observations of nature due to her scientific background and explore themes of illness, including her experience with breast cancer.

In 2008, she published her first book, titled Leaving Resurrection: Chronicles of a Whale Scientist, which is a collection of essays that incorporates both her scientific background and personal accounts. She explores how science and art blend together to foster meaning. In her essays, she also reflects on her history with the Prince William Sound, honouring the animals who call it home, and its people in the surrounding areas.

After being diagnosed with breast cancer in 2010, she published a book of poetry in 2012 titled Many Ways to Say It. Exploring this idea of a "marriage" between her and Alaska, the place she calls home. Utilising this metaphor, she unveils the difficulties and blessings she has faced whilst living in Alaska. It is a text that contains themes of self-discovery, self-acceptance, and humanity.

In 2013, she published a memoir through Beacon Press, titled Into Great Silence: A Memoir of Discovery and Loss Among Vanishing Orcas. This memoir chronicles and documents the lives of an endangered family of orcas she was researching. She discusses the Exxon Valdez Oil Spill, sharing how the orcas have been impacted by the event.

In 2015, she published Prayer in Wind after being diagnosed with metastatic breast cancer. She found herself using prayer to dig deeper into her background. This book explores her personal connection and family ties and histories, through prayer-poetry.

Published posthumously in 2016, Becoming Earth concludes her literary journey. The collection of essays discusses mortality, the vibrance of life, and accounts her battle with her illness and nearing death. She confronts the question, "how are you going to live when you know you are going to die?"

== Teaching and community impact ==
Saulitis fostered creativity and imagination in her students through her integration of science with narrative storytelling. In her final days, she continued to mentor students, as she found it therapeutic and rewarding. She taught creative writing at the Kachemak Bay Campus of Kenai Peninsula College in Homer, and was an associate professor in the University of Alaska Anchorage's Low Residency MFA program. She was one of the founders of the Kachemak Bay Writers' Conference, and co-founder of the North Gulf Oceanic Society.

"I hadn’t really ever met and you know hadn’t really read much writing by somebody who was both a poet and a scientist – somebody who could write lyrically and also richly scientific and with a real keen eye to natural history," said Miranda Weiss, one of her former students. Another student of hers, Linda Martin, said, "She would praise and cajole and really get into each of her students’ work. It was wonderful to see. Also I just loved looking at Eva and listening to her because she was beautiful and enthusiastic." Students praised Saulitis, who, through her blending of scientific writing with lyrical poetry, as well as fostering a safe space to facilitate insightful conversations, inspired others.

== Awards and honors ==
Saulitis has received notable recognition for her impact in the literary community. In 2014, her impact on the Alaska literary community was recognized with the Alaska Governor’s Award in the Arts and Humanities. She also received several other writing fellowships and honors from the Alaska Humanities Forum, the Rasmuson Foundation, the Island Institute, and the Alaska State Council on the Arts. Days before her death, she heard the news that she received the Homer Council on the Arts Lifetime Achievement Award.

== Death and legacy ==
Saulitis began writing her own final story in the summer of 2013, when she found out the breast cancer that had been in remission since 2010 had returned and metastasized. In her blog on a patient support website (www.caringbridge.org), she wrote about the unbearable mental and physical battle with disease. She died in 2016, aged 52, from breast cancer, at her home in Homer, Alaska. In preparation for her own death, she and her family built her coffin together, woven from branches and grasses found in their surroundings. She wrote, in her final message to her loved ones, "It was a good day to die, because it was such a good life to have lived." A scholarship fund at the University of Alaska Anchorage was named for Saulitis. In 2019, Randon Billings Noble of The Rumpus recommended Saulitis's Leaving Resurrection in a list titled "What to Read When You’re Haunted".
