= Pratt Museum =

Natural History Museum in Homer, Alaska

Coordinates: 59°38′42″N 151°32′58″W

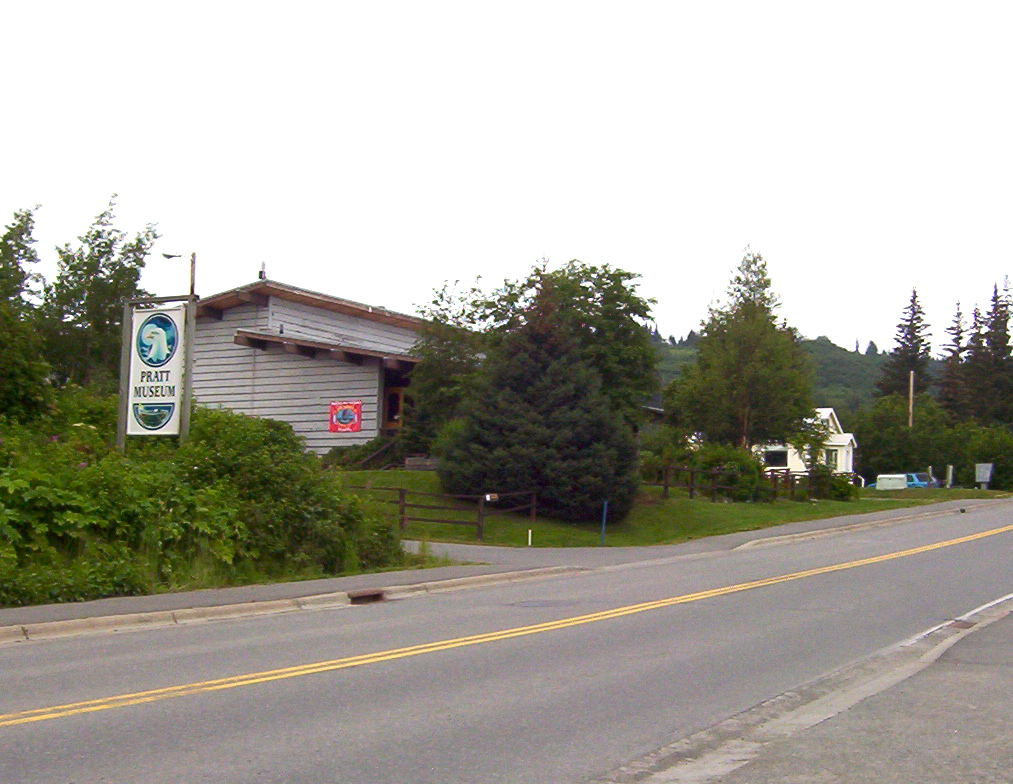
- Current museum building as seen from Bartlett Street.
- Website: www.prattmuseum.org

The Pratt Museum is a regional natural history museum located in Homer, Alaska, with exhibits exploring life around Kachemak Bay in South Central Alaska. The museum's mission is to preserve "the stories of the Kachemak Bay region", through "collections, exhibits, and programs in culture, science, and art". Indoor exhibits include early homesteading, Native Alaskan traditions, local contemporary art, and an exploration of the marine and terrestrial life around Kachemak Bay. Outdoor exhibits feature a historic cabin, botanical gardens and a nature trail.

== History ==
The Pratt Museum had its beginnings in the Homer Society of Natural History, which had incorporated in 1965. The museum opened in 1968 in a building designed by Crittenden, Cassetta, Wirum & Jacobs of Anchorage.

Local artist Sam Pratt had a collection of items that led to the founding of the society. Hazel Heath, the treasurer of the society from 1968 to 1983 and mayor of Homer from 1968 to 1976, has been credited with founding the museum, which was established in 1968.

Sam Pratt and his wife Vega donated the land on which the museum was built, and Sam Pratt served as the first volunteer curator of the museum.

== Exhibits ==
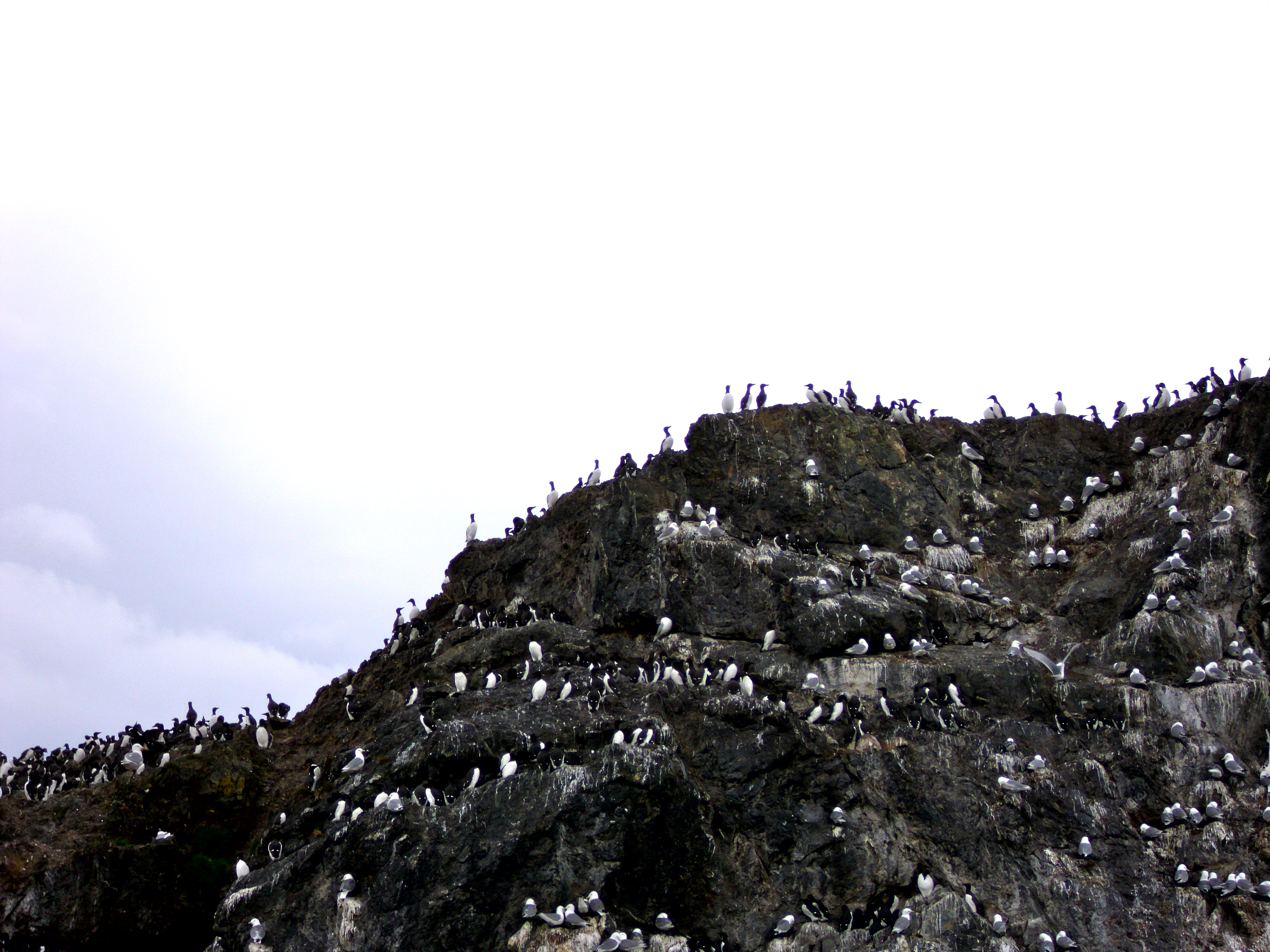
Visitors to the museum can view live footage of seabirds at Gull Island

The main gallery's exhibit at the Pratt Museum is entitled Kachemak Bay: An Exploration of People & Place, which explores the cultures that have existed in Kachemak Bay, as well as contemporary life in Kachemak Bay. The gallery has exhibits from early Native Alaskans to the homesteaders of the 1930s and 1940s, to the current fisheries that sustain the Kachemak Bay area, including Homer, Kachemak City, Seldovia, Halibut Cove, Anchor Point, and additional villages around the Bay.

One major attraction for visitors is a live-feed wildlife camera set up to view seabirds such as puffins, cormorants, and murres on Gull Island in Kachemak Bay. The camera is controlled at the museum, with a touchscreen below the main screen for visitor use. The SeeBird Camera (or Gull Cam) is also available online during the summer months, although it is controlled by the visitors at the museum and not the online visitors.

The museum also hosts a number of interactive activities, from fish-feeding on Tuesdays and Fridays to tours of the harbor on the Homer Spit on Fridays and Saturdays during the summer months.

As of 2021, the Pratt Museum has expanded and restored the Botanical Garden, featuring over 150 plants that are native to the region. There is also a small Homestead Garden which features annuals and perennials that were and are of significance to farmers and homesteaders on the Kenai Peninsula.

== Expansion ==
The Pratt Museum has been working to build a new facility on its 9.8 acre property, to increase exhibit space and storage space for its collections. The new building would also be on one level, eliminating the need for staircases and elevators, and would have other efficiencies not possible with the current building. The Pratt Museum's Board of Directors decided to support the creation of a new museum building, and started on the design of this building in 2010.
