= Hazel P. Heath =

American politician and entrepreneur

Mayor of Homer, Alaska
- In office 1968–1976
- Preceded by: Larry Farnen
- Succeeded by: Gary Williams

Personal details
- Born: Hazel W. Parris; December 9, 1909 Athena, Oregon, U.S.
- Died: May 29, 1998 (aged 88) Homer, Alaska, U.S.
- Party: Republican
- Spouse: Kenneth A. Heath
- Occupation: Entrepreneur
- Profession: Politician

Hazel P. Heath (née Parris; December 9, 1909 – May 29, 1998) was an American politician and an entrepreneur who manufactured and sold gift boxes of jams and jellies made of wild local berries from Homer, Alaska. She founded "Alaska Wild Berry Products" with her husband Ken in 1946. The couple also owned an art shop and gallery, and she was arts and crafts editor for Alaska magazine.

Heath served as mayor of Homer for eight years, and was a National Republican delegate and a member of many local, state and federal boards and commissions. She was a founder of the Pratt Museum, and was the first woman president of the Alaska Municipal League Conference of Mayors. The Homer Chamber of Commerce named her the 1977 "Citizen of the Year", and the University of Alaska honored her with a Meritorious Service Award in 1989.

== Early life and education ==
Hazel Parris was born on December 9, 1909, in Athena, Oregon, the daughter of Wesley F. Parris and Olive Grace Belle Bryan. After graduating from high school in Helix, Oregon, in 1928 she attended business college in Seattle, where she married Kenneth A. Heath (1902–1965). The couple went together from Seattle to Alaska for defense jobs and toured Kodiak Island. In her memoir of early days in Homer, she wrote, "By the time we returned from our six weeks trip with Dal, around Kodiak Island where we ate ducks, clams, crabs, shrimp, blueberries, cranberries, smoked salmon and other kinds of seafood, we were completely sold on Alaska living."

== Alaska Wild Berry Products ==
In September 1946, Heath and her husband Ken partnered with Freda Coles to run the Kachemak Café on Pioneer Avenue in Homer, Alaska. Eventually, Heath took over operations of the café. Heath also began selling homemade local berry jams and jellies, canning on a large range powered by coal at the back of the café, establishing Alaska Wild Berry Products. The Heaths sold the café in 1955 to Sam and Goldy Gasperac.

Heath's business plan was met with skepticism by locals, who doubted there were enough berries to "make gift boxes and ship them all over the country". Heath paid children to pick wild berries, and "when the fishing season was slim" she also paid fishermen and other locals to harvest the berries. Her business developed so quickly that in 1947 she sold 300 gift boxes, and by 1957 the business exported over 4000 gift boxes.

Husband Ken abandoned his plans to start a "cabin court" business (a cluster of cottages for short-term rental) and instead purchased a Super Cub airplane to be able to harvest choice remote berry patches. They shipped gift boxes in large containers on steam ships to a forwarding station in Seattle, where packages were addressed and sent out by rail. Ken Heath died in January 1964, and Hazel Heath continued to manage the business until she sold it in 1975.

One local resident observed, "Ken and Hazel had the idea that if you made up your mind you were going to make a living from the country, you could do it. I think that their enterprise really showed that it is possible if you have ingenuity and ambition."

== Community service ==
Heath is credited as a founder of the Pratt Museum in 1967. She was treasurer of the Homer Society of Natural History, Inc., the museum's sponsoring agency, from 1968 to 1983. As an active member of the Alaska Historical Society until 1986, she served two terms on its board of directors; she was also a member of the Kenai Peninsula Historical Association, serving as its president for two years. In 1968 she established Homer Artists.

She served on the board of directors of the Alaska State Chamber of Commerce from 1967 to 1984, and was a charter member of the Alaska Visitors Association. After she served on the Executive Committee of the Kenai Peninsula Development Council, Governor Jay Hammond recruited her for the Governor's Tourism Advisory Board.

== Political career ==
Heath was a member of the Alaska Republican Party and National Republican Party and was the city of Homer's mayor from 1968 to 1976. She was the first woman president of the Alaska Municipal League Conference of Mayors. She lost her 1976 bid for re-election to the local newspaper editor who supported revocation of oil leases in the Kachemak Bay, which she opposed.

Heath "was a national Republican delegate many times, and was a member of numerous federal, state and local boards and commissions, including the University of Alaska, local and state chambers of commerce, local and state museum boards, and state and national senior citizens advisory boards".

Governors Hammond and Bill Sheffield appointed her to the Older Alaskans Commission between 1982 and 1989. As a ten-year member of the Kenai Peninsula Community College Council, she served two years as its president.

== Writing and editing ==
Heath wrote and compiled first-person accounts of early pioneers in Homer, In Those Days — Alaska Pioneers of the Lower Kenai Peninsula.

She worked as arts and crafts editor at Alaska magazine for five years.

== Awards and legacy ==
According to one source, "Heath’s pioneering role in local and state government paved the way for many other women to get involved in politics. She possessed an acute doggedness when undertaking something that would make life in Homer and Alaska better for herself and others."

In 1977 she was named the Homer Chamber of Commerce "Citizen of the Year", and the University of Alaska gave her a Meritorious Service Award in 1989.

Heath was inducted into the 2010 Class of the Alaska Women's Hall of Fame.
