= USCGC Roanoke Island =

US Coast Guard ship

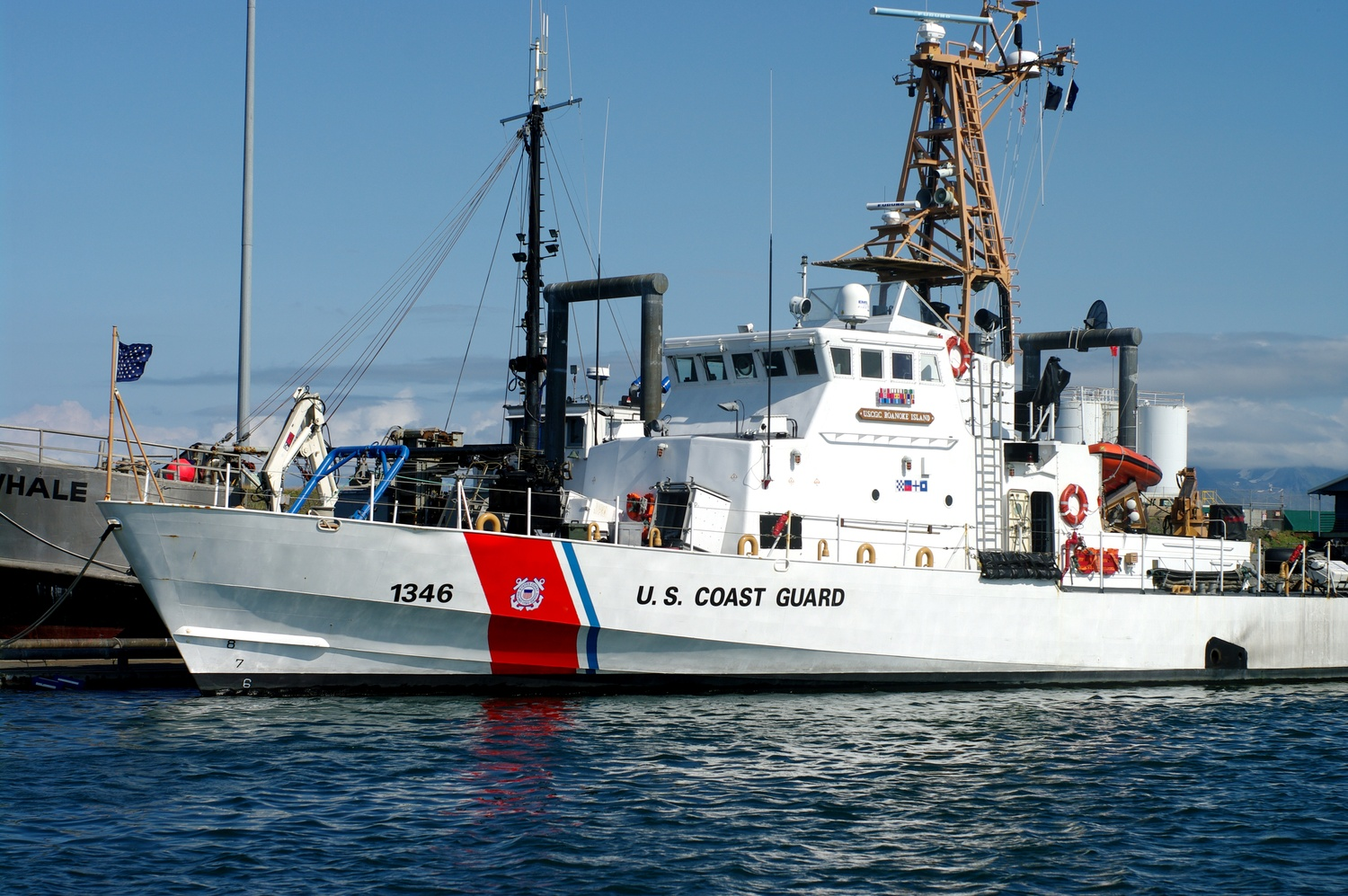
- Roanoke Island moored in Homer, Alaska

History

United States
- Name: Roanoke Island
- Namesake: Roanoke Island, North Carolina, U.S.
- Operator: United States Coast Guard
- Builder: Bollinger Shipyard, LA
- Cost: Approx. $7 Million
- Commissioned: 7 February 1992
- Decommissioned: 4 June 2015
- Out of service: 6 April 2015
- Home port: Homer, Alaska
- Identification: MMSI number: 367948000; Callsign: NEXP
- Fate: Transferred to Costa Rica, 13 October 2017
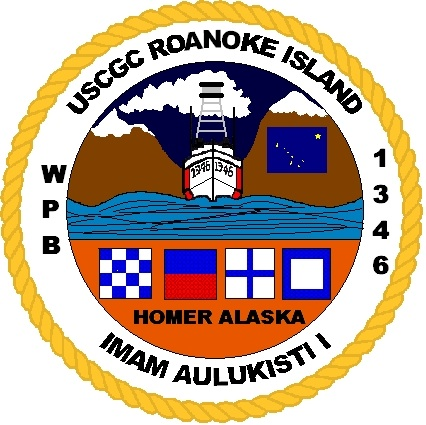
- Badge: Crest of the USCGC Roanoke Island

Costa Rica
- Name: General José María Cañas Escamilla
- Namesake: José María Cañas Escamilla
- Operator: Costa Rica Navy
- Acquired: 13 October 2017
- Identification: GC110-1
- Status: Active as of 2018

General characteristics
- Class & type: Island-class patrol boat
- Displacement: 164 tons
- Length: 110 ft (34 m)
- Beam: 21 ft (6.4 m)
- Draft: 6.5 ft (2.0 m)
- Propulsion: Twin Turbo Charged Diesel Caterpillar
- Speed: +30 knots (56 km/h; 35 mph)
- Range: 9,900 miles
- Endurance: 6 days
- Boats & landing craft carried: 1 rigid-hulled inflatable boat
- Complement: 18 personnel (3 officers, 15 enlisted)
- Armament: 25 mm Mk 38 machine gun; 5 × .50-caliber machine guns; 1 × MK 19 40 mm grenade launcher

USCGC Roanoke Island is the 46th Island-class cutter to be commissioned in the United States Coast Guard. She was commissioned in Homer, Alaska, on February 7, 1992, joining five other Island-class cutters based in Alaska at that time. Her primary missions included "search and rescue, fisheries enforcement & homeland security." The ship was taken out of service in 2015 and transferred to Costa Rica in 2017, where the vessel was renamed General Juan Rafael Mora Porras.

== Construction and career ==
=== American service ===
In 2010, the Roanoke Island rescued the fishing vessel Wahoo after Wahoo became disabled in bad weather near Pearl Island.

On October 25, 2012, following a 135-day refit in a drydock in Ketchikan, Coast Guard Alaska explained the refit allowed the vessel to remain service until she was replaced by a new Sentinel-class cutter. Nevertheless, the Homer News reported that the Roanoke would leave Homer by the end of June 2015, for her decommissioning in Baltimore, Maryland. A sister ship, USCGC Sapelo, previously stationed in San Juan, Puerto Rico, replaced her. The Sapelo was freed up as the Island-class cutters in San Juan are replaced by new Sentinel-class cutters.

On June 4, 2015, Roanoke Island was decommissioned at a ceremony held in homeport of Homer, Alaska. The ship was then transferred to the Coast Guard Yard in Baltimore, Maryland for disposal.

=== Costa Rican service ===
On October 13, 2017, Roanoke Island was transferred to Costa Rica. After refitting through the State Department's Foreign Military Sales program, she was recommissioned General Juan Rafael Mora Porras (GC110-1).
