= USCGC Sapelo =

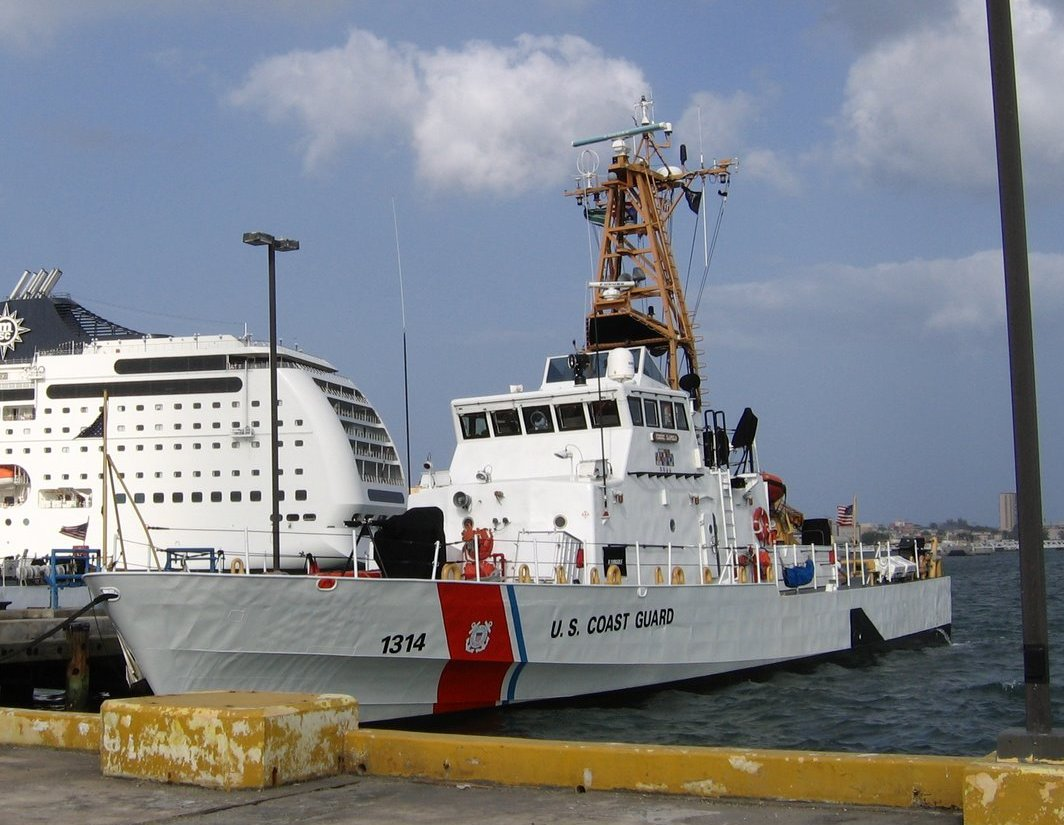
- USCGC Sapelo moored next to a cruise liner in San Juan.

History

United States
- Name: Sapelo
- Namesake: Sapelo Island, Georgia, U.S.
- Builder: Bollinger Shipyard
- Cost: Approx. $7 Million
- Home port: Eureka, California; San Juan, Puerto Rico; Homer, Alaska
- Identification: MMSI number: 367911000; Callsign: NHKD
- Status: Decommissioned/scrapped

General characteristics
- Class & type: Island-class patrol boat
- Displacement: 164 tons
- Length: 110 ft (34 m)
- Beam: 21 ft (6.4 m)
- Draft: 6.5 ft (2.0 m)
- Propulsion: Twin Paxman Valenta 16-CM RP-200M
- Speed: 30+ knots
- Range: 9,900 miles
- Endurance: 6 days
- Boats & landing craft carried: 1 - RHI (90 HP outboard engine)
- Complement: 18 personnel (3 officers, 15 enlisted)
- Armament: 25 mm Mk 38 machine gun; 5 × .50 caliber machine guns; 1 × MK 19 40MM Grenade Launcher Various Small Arms

The USCGC Sapelo (WPB-1314) is an Island class cutter, operated by the United States Coast Guard. In 2013, unlike other Island class cutters, she was not commanded by a commissioned officer, she was commanded by a Chief Warrant Officer.

In 2013 the Sapelo seized a shipment of 1.3 tons of cocaine, estimated to be worth $34 million United States dollars.

In June 2015, the Homer News reported that a sister ship of Sapelo, Roanoke Island, stationed in Homer, Alaska, was being retired. They reported that, since the Sapelo had been replaced by a new Sentinel class cutter, she would be brought to Homer to replace Roanoke Island. The previous crew of Roanoke Island would then cross-deck to Sapelo in a crew swap.

== Design ==
The Island-class patrol boats were constructed in Bollinger Shipyards, Lockport, Louisiana. Sapelo has an overall length of 110 feet (34 m). It had a beam of 21 feet (6.4 m) and a draft of 7 feet (2.1 m) at the time of construction. The patrol boat has a displacement of 154 tonnes (152 long tons; 170 short tons) at full load and 137 tonnes (135 long tons; 151 short tons) at half load. It is powered two Paxman Valenta 16 CM diesel engines or two Caterpillar 3516 diesel engines. It has two 99 kilowatts (135 PS; 133 shp) 3304T diesel generators made by Caterpillar; these can serve as motor–generators. Its hull is constructed from highly strong steel, and the superstructure and major deck are constructed from aluminium.

The Island-class patrol boats have maximum sustained speeds of 29.5 knots (54.6 km/h; 33.9 mph). It is fitted with one 25 millimetres (0.98 in) machine gun and two 7.62 millimetres (0.300 in) M60 light machine guns; it may also be fitted with two Browning .50 Caliber Machine Guns. It is fitted with satellite navigation systems, collision avoidance systems, surface radar, and a Loran C system. It has a range of 3,330 miles (2,890 nmi; 5,360 km) and an endurance of five days. Its complement is sixteen (two officers and fourteen crew members). Island-class patrol boats are based on Vosper Thornycroft 33 metres (108 ft) patrol boats and have similar dimensions.
