= Kachemak Bay Campus =

University of Alaska campus in Homer, Alaska, United States

Coordinates: 59.64738°N 151.53108°W

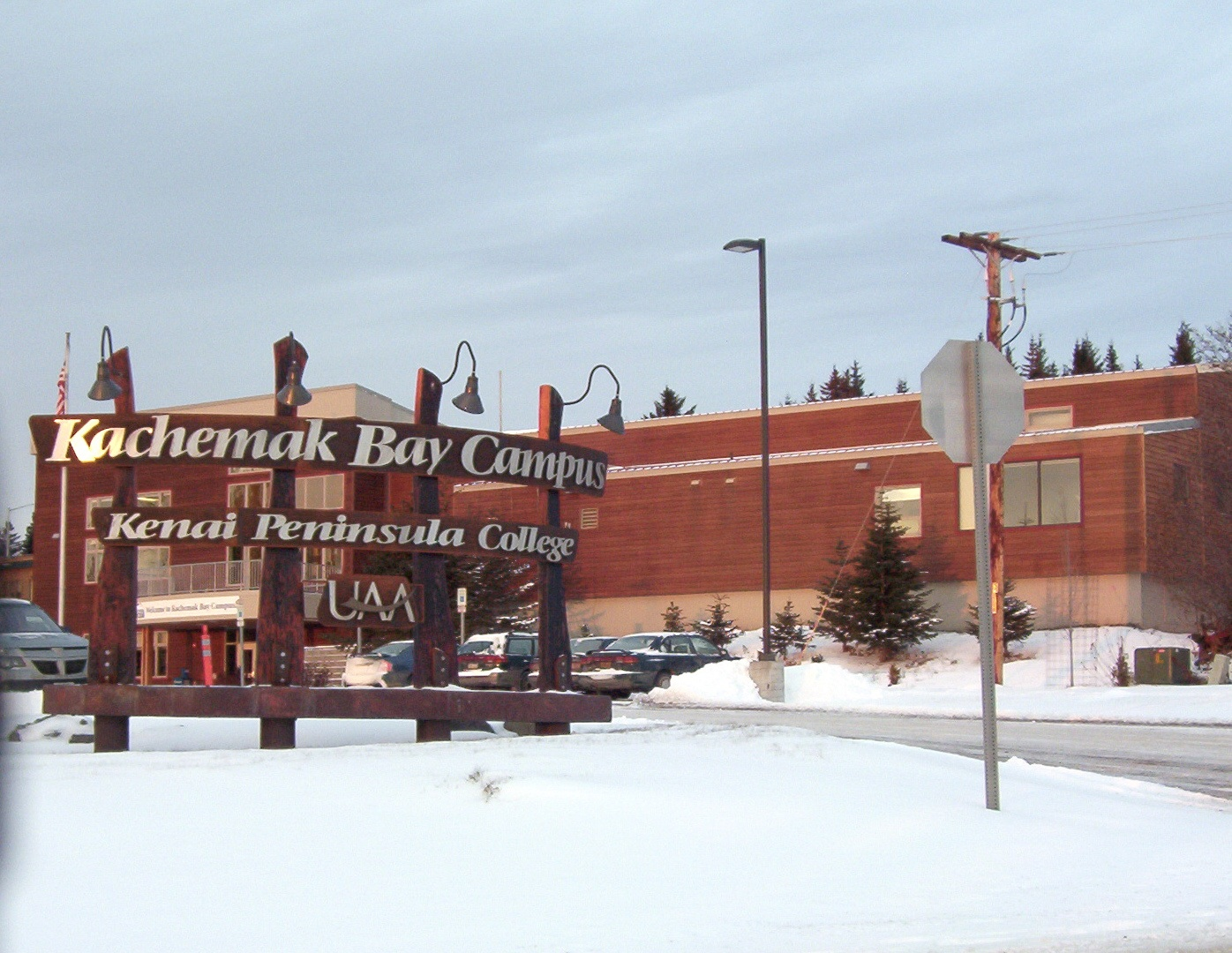
Main entrance to the campus on Heath street

Kachemak Bay Campus (KBC) is a campus of Kenai Peninsula College, which is a unit of the University of Alaska Anchorage. Located in Homer, KBC has a student population of about 500. The college was formerly divided into two campuses, referred to as east and west campuses respectively. The college had proposed purchasing Homer's city hall, which is adjacent to the east campus, in order to consolidate their facilities, but this would have been part of a larger project to build a new city hall and a town square in Homer, and the plan was rejected by voters. The college eventually decided to build an entirely new facility on the existing campus property. The new facility, known as Bayview Hall opened after spring break in 2011. The hall is 7,000 square feet (650 m^{2}) and cost 2.5 million dollars to construct. It contains new classrooms, faculty offices, and a multi purpose "learning center."
