= Homer Public Library =

Library in Homer, Alaska, U.S.

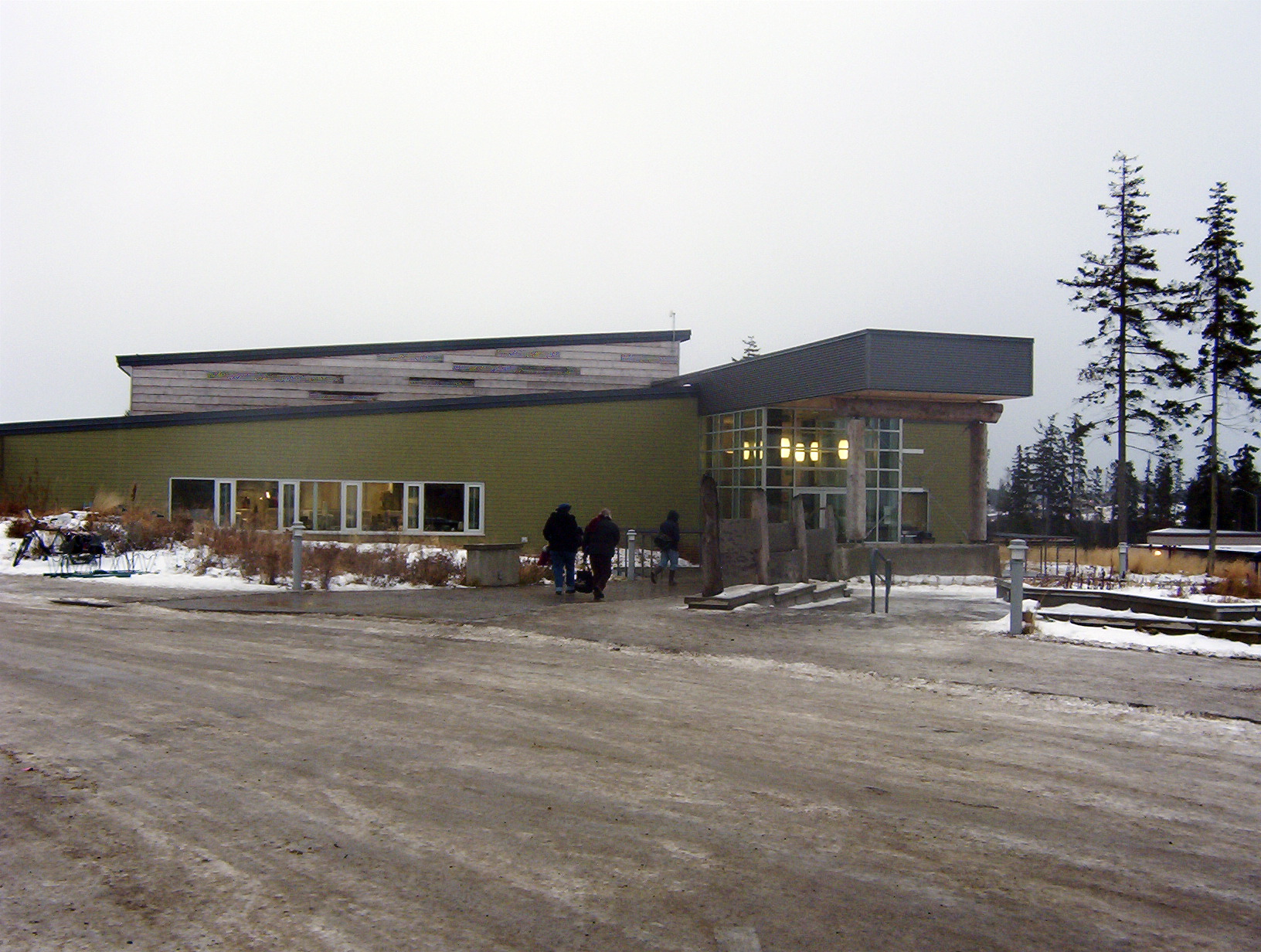
- Library main entrance.
- 59.6437557°N 151.5315919°W
- Location: Homer, Alaska, United States
- Type: Public
- Established: 1940s

Collection
- Size: 45,000

Access and use
- Population served: 12,000

Other information
- Director: Dave Berry
- Website: www.cityofhomer-ak.gov/library

The Homer Public Library is located at 500 Hazel Avenue in Homer, Alaska. It serves the communities of the Southern Kenai Peninsula from Ninilchik to the south side of Kachemak Bay.

The library, a department of the City of Homer, has six full-time and three part-time staff. The current director of the library is Dave Berry. Previous directors include Ann Dixon and Helen Hill. The library is aided by an advisory board and Friends of the Homer Library.

== History ==
Interest in a public library in Homer began in the 1940s when the Homer Women's club set up a library in an old school building. The town had previously been contacted by Anthony Dimond, the Alaska Territory Delegate in the House of Representatives, who offered to help provide the town with books if a library building was built. By 1950 the library was fully constructed at a cost of $1,500. The Anchorage Daily News described it as a "simple green cabin of about 600 square feet with a storm porch." With the help secured from Dimond, the library received $50 annually from the territory.

In 1978, the library became a department of the City of Homer, and the following year was replaced by a 3,500 square foot building on Pioneer Ave.

In 1987, the library introduced a program in which they accept manuscripts from the community, publish them, and display them for checkout by library patrons. Termed the "Top Drawer Collection", books ranging from 50 to 500 pages are presented by the library each year during National Library Week.

== Building ==
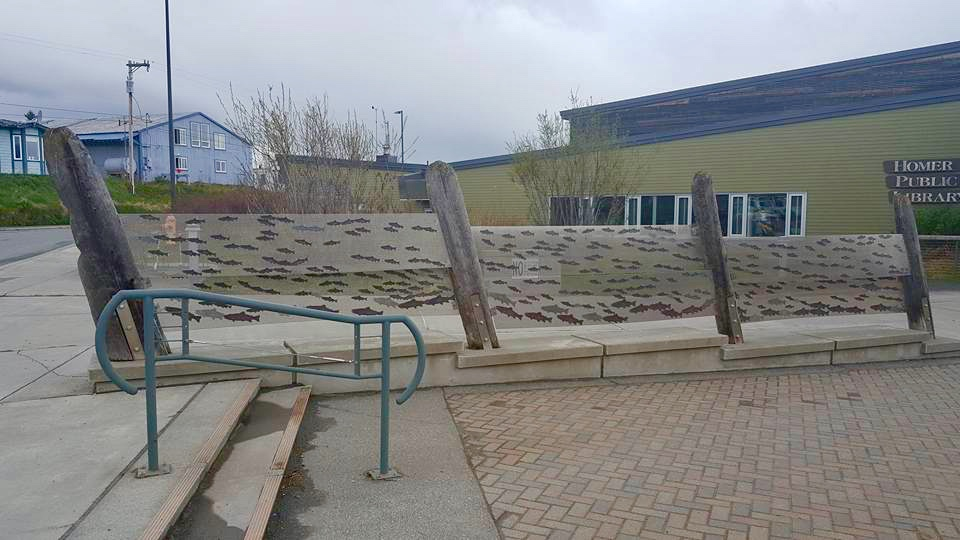
Each metal fish on this wall is engraved with the name of a donor to the library’s construction costs.

Construction of a new library building started in 2003 and ended in 2006. The Anchorage Daily News described it as "an architectural sensation." It opened to the public on September 16, 2006, covers 17,000 feet and cost a total of $8.8 million to construct. It was funded primarily through Government grants ($3,813,000), a 30-year USDA Rural Development loan ($2,200,000) and various foundation grants ($1,336,000).

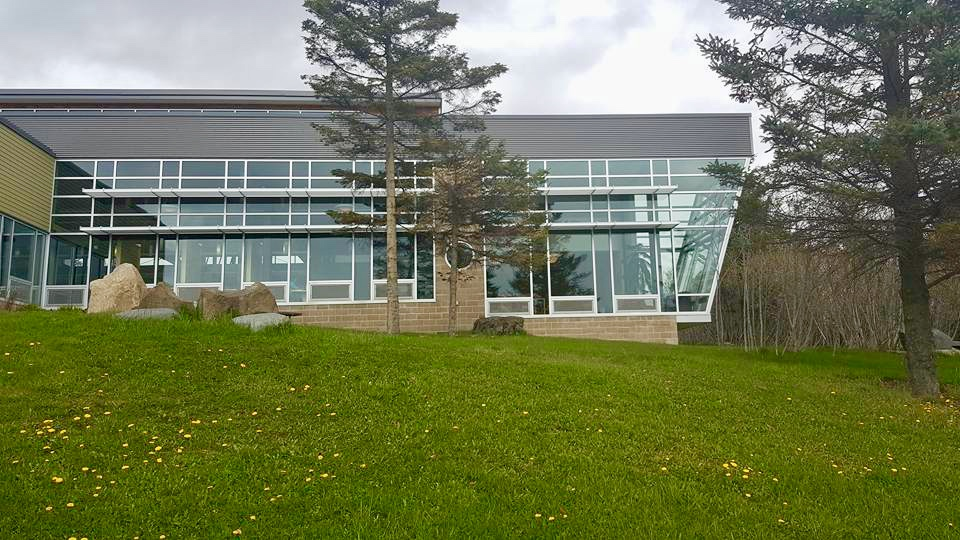
Reading areas at the east end of the library feature floor-to ceiling glass

The building was awarded LEED Silver certification by the U.S. Green Building Council. The library was the third certified LEED building in Alaska, the second to achieve the silver rating, but the first public building in the state to earn this silver certification for "materials, indoor air quality, performance, energy use and overall environmental impact." LEED certification encourages the use or reuse of local materials which meant, among other things, that an old gym floor from the Kenai High School was used for countertops.

The architecture firm, ECI/Hyer, has received several awards for the building:

- 2007 Honor Award, AIA Alaska Chapter
- 2007 Member's Choice Award, AIA Alaska Chapter State Convention
- 2007 Best Non-Residential Award, AIA Alaska Chapter State Convention
- 2007 Judge's Choice: Community Beautification Award, Homer Chamber of Commerce
- 2006 People's Choice Award, AIA Alaska Chapter State Convention

In 2005, the library was investigated by the United States Environmental Protection Agency under the Clean Water Act for failing to apply for a National Pollutant Discharge Elimination System (NPDES) permit.
