= Homer, Alaska =

City in south-central Alaska, United States

- City
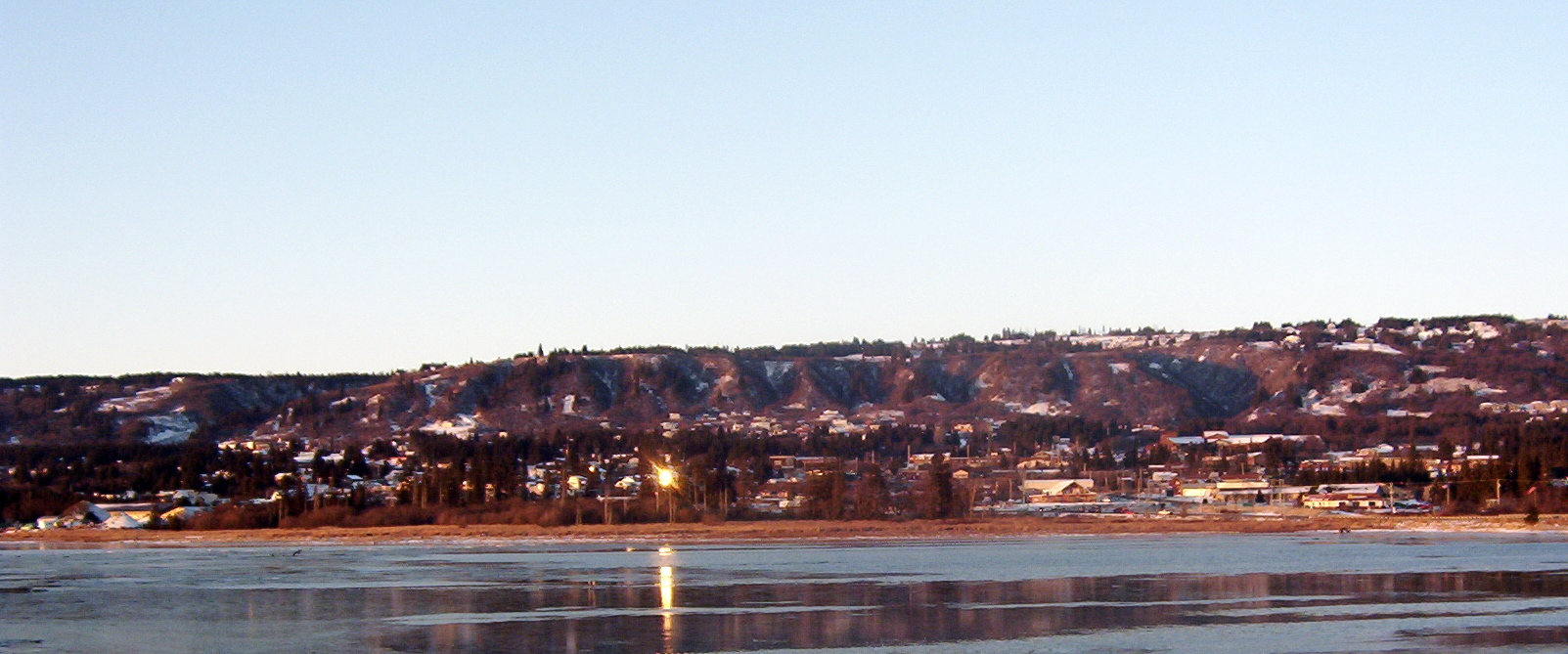
- Downtown Homer seen from Beluga Slough

- Flag Seal
- Motto(s): Where the land ends and the sea begins
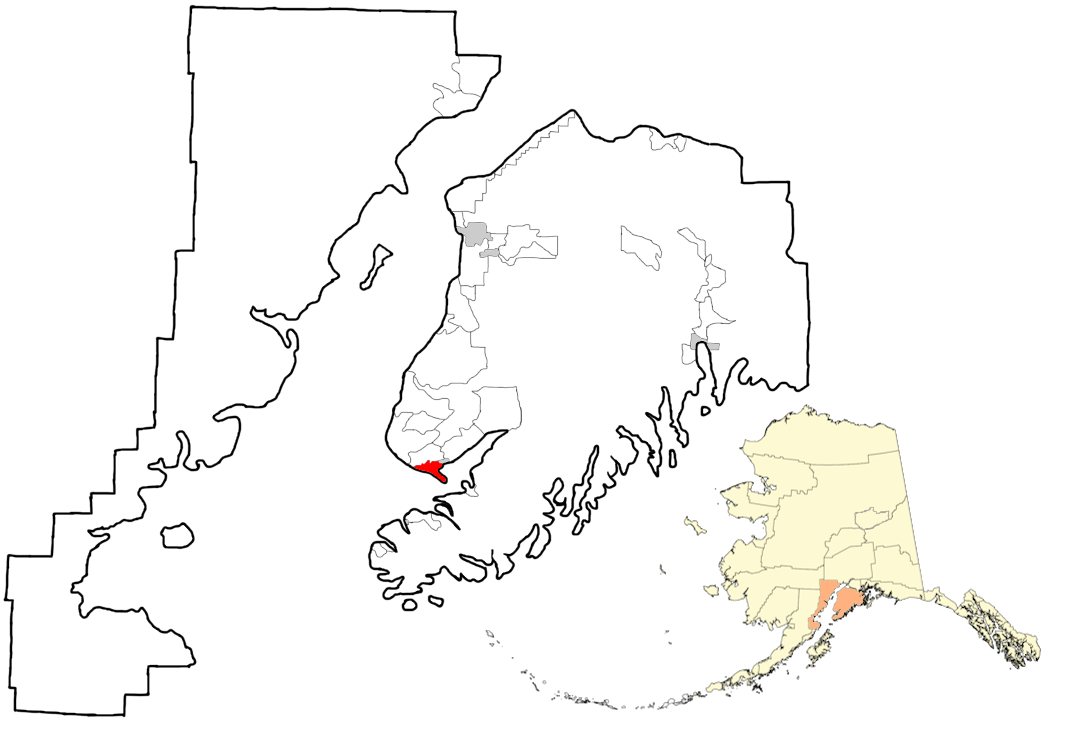
- Location in Kenai Peninsula Borough, Alaska
- Coordinates: 59°38′35″N 151°31′33″W
- Country: United States
- State: Alaska
- Borough: Kenai Peninsula
- Incorporated: March 31, 1964

Government
  - Mayor: Rachel Lord
  - State senator: Gary Stevens (R)
  - State rep.: Sarah Vance (R)

Area
  - Total: 25.25 sq mi (65.41 km^{2})
  - Land: 13.79 sq mi (35.71 km^{2})
  - Water: 11.47 sq mi (29.70 km^{2})
- Elevation: 95 ft (29 m)

Population (2020)
  - Total: 5,522
  - Density: 400.5/sq mi (154.64/km^{2})
- Time zone: UTC−9 (Alaska (AKST))
  - Summer (DST): UTC−8 (AKDT)
- ZIP code: 99603
- Area code: 907
- FIPS code: 02-33140
- GNIS feature ID: 1413141
- Website: www.cityofhomer-ak.gov

Homer (Dena'ina: Tuggeght) is a city in Kenai Peninsula Borough in the U.S. state of Alaska. It is 218 mi (351 km) southwest of Anchorage. According to the 2020 census, the population was 5,522, up from 5,003 in 2010. Long known as the "Halibut Fishing Capital of the World", Homer is also nicknamed "the end of the road", and more recently, "the cosmic hamlet by the sea".

== Geography ==
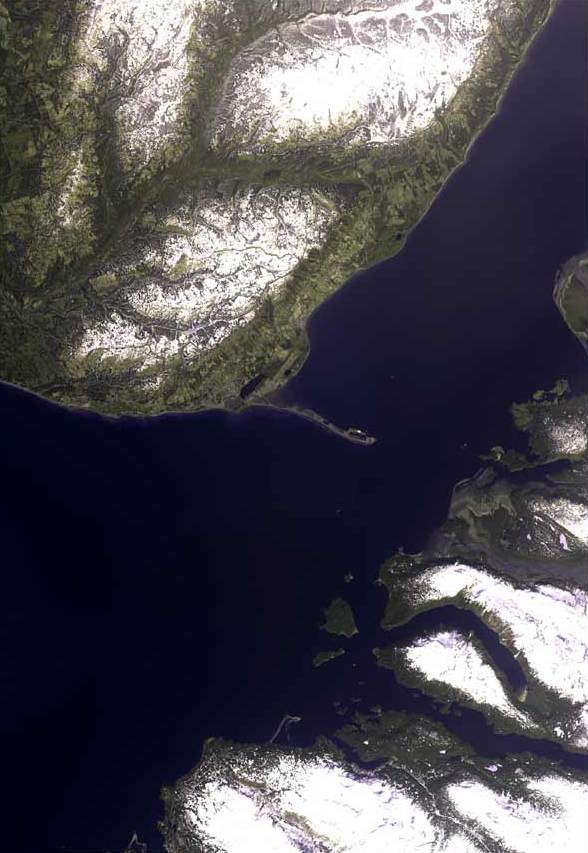
Homer from space

Homer is located at 59°38'35" North, 151°31'33" West (59.643059, −151.525900). The only road into Homer is the Sterling Highway. The town has a total area of 25.5 square miles (66 km^{2}), of which 15 square miles (39 km^{2}) are land and 10.5 square miles (27 km^{2}) are covered by water.

Homer is on the shore of Kachemak Bay on the southwest side of the Kenai Peninsula. Its distinguishing feature is the Homer Spit, a narrow 4.5 mi (7.2 km) long gravel bar that extends into the bay, on which is located the Homer Harbor. Much of the coastline, as well as the Homer Spit, sank dramatically during the Good Friday earthquake in March 1964. After the earthquake, very little vegetation was able to survive on the Homer Spit.

=== Climate ===
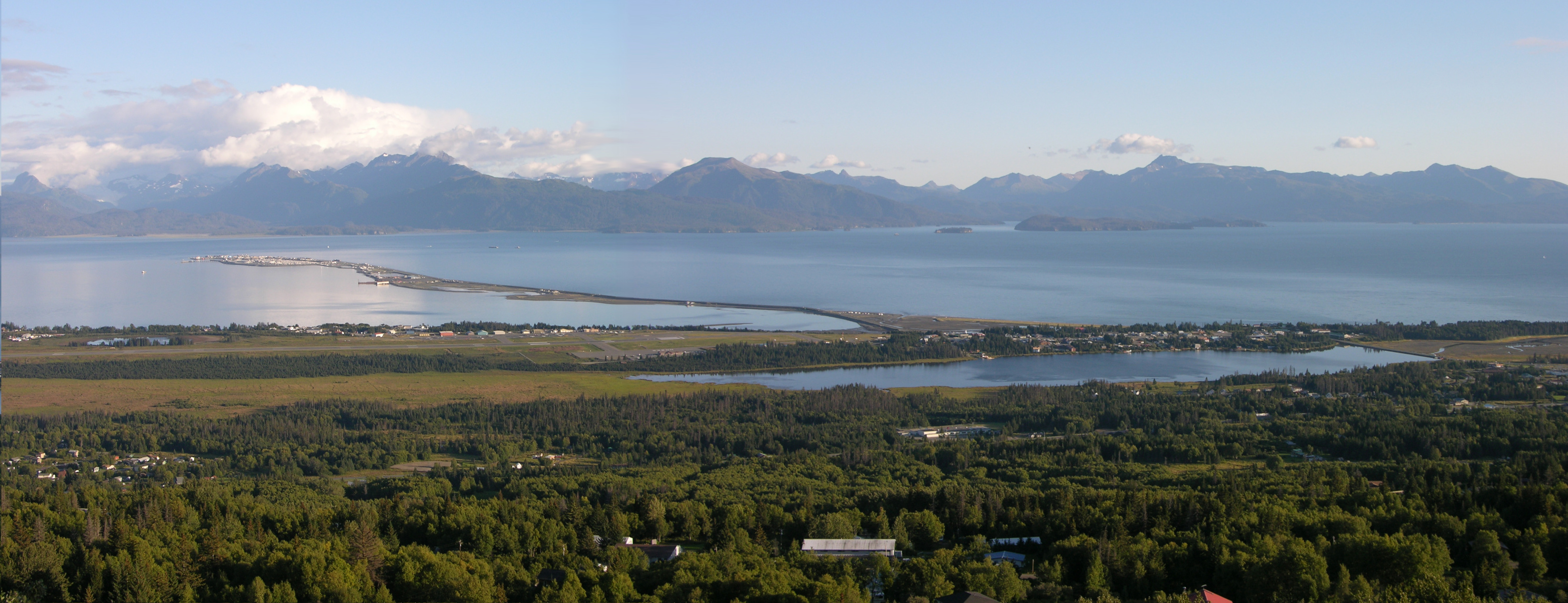
Homer during hot season

As with much of South-central Alaska, Homer has a moderate subarctic mediterranean climate (Köppen: Dsc), which causes its weather to be moderate compared to interior Alaska. Winters are snowy and long, but not particularly cold, considering the latitude, with the average January high only slightly below freezing. The annual snowfall averages 50 inches (127 cm) per season, falling primarily from November through March, with some accumulation in October and April but rarely in May. Homer receives only about 25 inches of rainfall annually due to the influence of the Chugach Mountains to the southeast, which shelter it from the Gulf of Alaska. As of 2023, Homer falls within USDA Hardiness Zone 6B. Seven days have a minimum 0 °F (−18 °C) or below annually. The coldest day of the year averaged 10 °F (−12 °C) in the 1991 to 2020 normals, while the warmest night average was at 55 °F (13 °C). The coldest daytime maximum on record is −8 °F (−22 °C) on January 28, 1989, while, conversely, the record warm daily minimum is 60 °F (16 °C) on August 9, 1971, and August 23, 1963. Summers are cool due to the marine influence, with 75 °F (24 °C) maxima or minima remaining at or above 55 °F (13 °C) being extremely rare. Extreme temperatures have ranged from −24 °F (−31 °C) on January 28–29, 1989, up to 81 °F (27 °C) on July 10, 1993. The coldest has been January 2012 with a mean temperature of 9.0 °F (−12.8 °C), while the warmest month was July 2019 at 58.6 °F (14.8 °C); the annual mean temperature has ranged from 32.9 °F (0.5 °C) in 1956 to 43.7 °F (6.5 °C) in 2014.

Climate data for Homer, Alaska (Homer Airport), 1991–2020 normals, (Note: Mean monthly maxima and minima (i.e. the highest and lowest temperature readings during an entire month or year) calculated based on data at said location from 1991 to 2020.) extremes 1932–present
Month	Jan	Feb	Mar	Apr	May	Jun	Jul	Aug	Sep	Oct	Nov	Dec	Year
Record high °F (°C)	57 (14)	53 (12)	54 (12)	65 (18)	72 (22)	80 (27)	81 (27)	78 (26)	69 (21)	64 (18)	58 (14)	52 (11)	81 (27)
Mean maximum °F (°C)	44.7 (7.1)	44.6 (7.0)	45.8 (7.7)	54.4 (12.4)	63.8 (17.7)	68.2 (20.1)	70.3 (21.3)	70.2 (21.2)	63.3 (17.4)	55.9 (13.3)	47.9 (8.8)	45.5 (7.5)	72.9 (22.7)
Mean daily maximum °F (°C)	31.8 (−0.1)	34.9 (1.6)	37.1 (2.8)	46.1 (7.8)	53.8 (12.1)	59.3 (15.2)	63.1 (17.3)	62.6 (17.0)	56.7 (13.7)	47.1 (8.4)	37.6 (3.1)	34.0 (1.1)	47.0 (8.3)
Daily mean °F (°C)	25.4 (−3.7)	28.3 (−2.1)	30.1 (−1.1)	38.7 (3.7)	46.0 (7.8)	52.0 (11.1)	56.1 (13.4)	55.3 (12.9)	49.5 (9.7)	40.2 (4.6)	31.2 (−0.4)	27.7 (−2.4)	40.0 (4.4)
Mean daily minimum °F (°C)	19.0 (−7.2)	21.7 (−5.7)	23.1 (−4.9)	31.3 (−0.4)	38.2 (3.4)	44.7 (7.1)	49.2 (9.6)	48.0 (8.9)	42.3 (5.7)	33.3 (0.7)	24.8 (−4.0)	21.4 (−5.9)	33.1 (0.6)
Mean minimum °F (°C)	−0.6 (−18.1)	4.3 (−15.4)	7.0 (−13.9)	19.9 (−6.7)	29.4 (−1.4)	36.7 (2.6)	41.4 (5.2)	38.7 (3.7)	30.2 (−1.0)	20.2 (−6.6)	9.0 (−12.8)	3.7 (−15.7)	−4.4 (−20.2)
Record low °F (°C)	−24 (−31)	−19 (−28)	−21 (−29)	−9 (−23)	6 (−14)	27 (−3)	34 (1)	31 (−1)	20 (−7)	0 (−18)	−7 (−22)	−16 (−27)	−24 (−31)
Average precipitation inches (mm)	2.15 (55)	1.82 (46)	1.32 (34)	1.15 (29)	0.78 (20)	0.87 (22)	1.45 (37)	2.31 (59)	3.28 (83)	2.61 (66)	2.87 (73)	3.27 (83)	23.88 (607)
Average snowfall inches (cm)	9.1 (23)	9.6 (24)	7.0 (18)	1.9 (4.8)	trace	0.0 (0.0)	0.0 (0.0)	0.0 (0.0)	0.0 (0.0)	2.6 (6.6)	7.0 (18)	10.2 (26)	47.4 (120.4)
Average precipitation days (≥ 0.01 in)	14.1	12.4	10.7	10.2	9.7	9.8	12.1	14.3	16.5	14.9	14.7	16.9	156.3
Average snowy days (≥ 0.1 in)	8.0	6.4	5.2	1.9	0.1	0.0	0.0	0.0	0.0	2.2	5.4	7.6	36.8
Average relative humidity (%)	79.7	78.0	74.0	73.8	74.2	76.2	80.2	81.6	81.4	78.5	78.9	79.4	78.0
Average dew point °F (°C)	17.4 (−8.1)	18.7 (−7.4)	21.6 (−5.8)	27.7 (−2.4)	35.4 (1.9)	42.3 (5.7)	47.8 (8.8)	47.8 (8.8)	42.3 (5.7)	31.3 (−0.4)	23.0 (−5.0)	19.0 (−7.2)	31.2 (−0.4)
Mean monthly sunshine hours	93	141.3	186	240	279	270	248	186	150	124	90	62	2,069.3
Mean daily sunshine hours	3	5	6	8	9	9	8	6	5	4	3	2	6
Percentage possible sunshine	43	54	50	55	52	48	45	39	39	40	39	33	45
Average ultraviolet index	0	0	1	3	4	5	5	4	2	1	0	0	2
Source 1: NOAA (relative humidity and dew point 1961–1990)(average snowfall/snow days 1981–2010)
Source 2: Weather Atlas (sun and uv)

See or edit raw graph data.

Coastal temperature data for Homer
Month	Jan	Feb	Mar	Apr	May	Jun	Jul	Aug	Sep	Oct	Nov	Dec	Year
Average sea temperature °F (°C)	37.6 (3.11)	38.3 (3.50)	37.2 (2.89)	38.8 (3.78)	42.1 (5.61)	46.8 (8.22)	50.4 (10.22)	52.0 (11.11)	51.6 (10.88)	47.7 (8.72)	43.5 (6.39)	41.0 (5.00)	43.9 (6.65)
Source 1: Seatemperature.net

== History ==
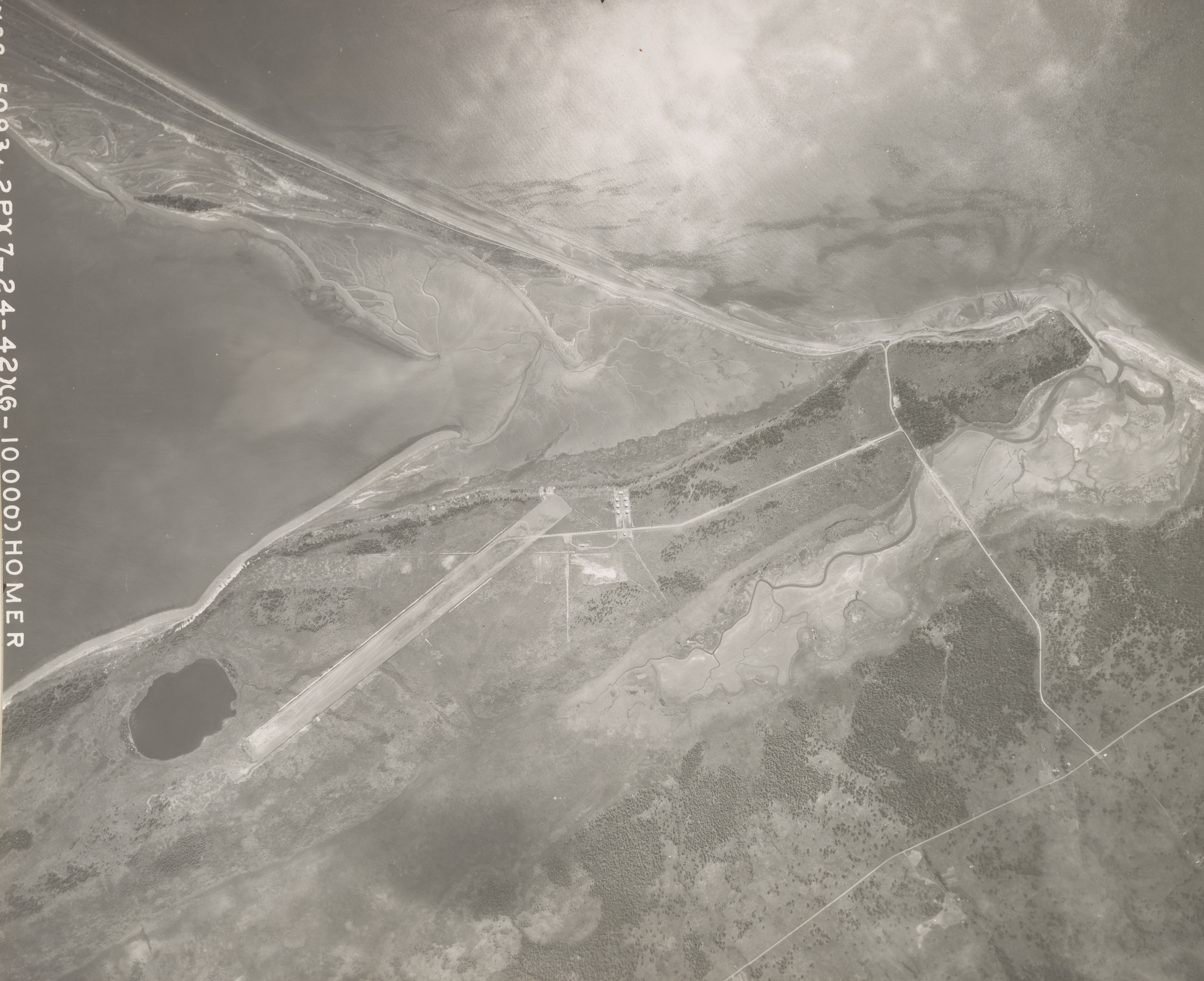
Homer Airstrip, 1942

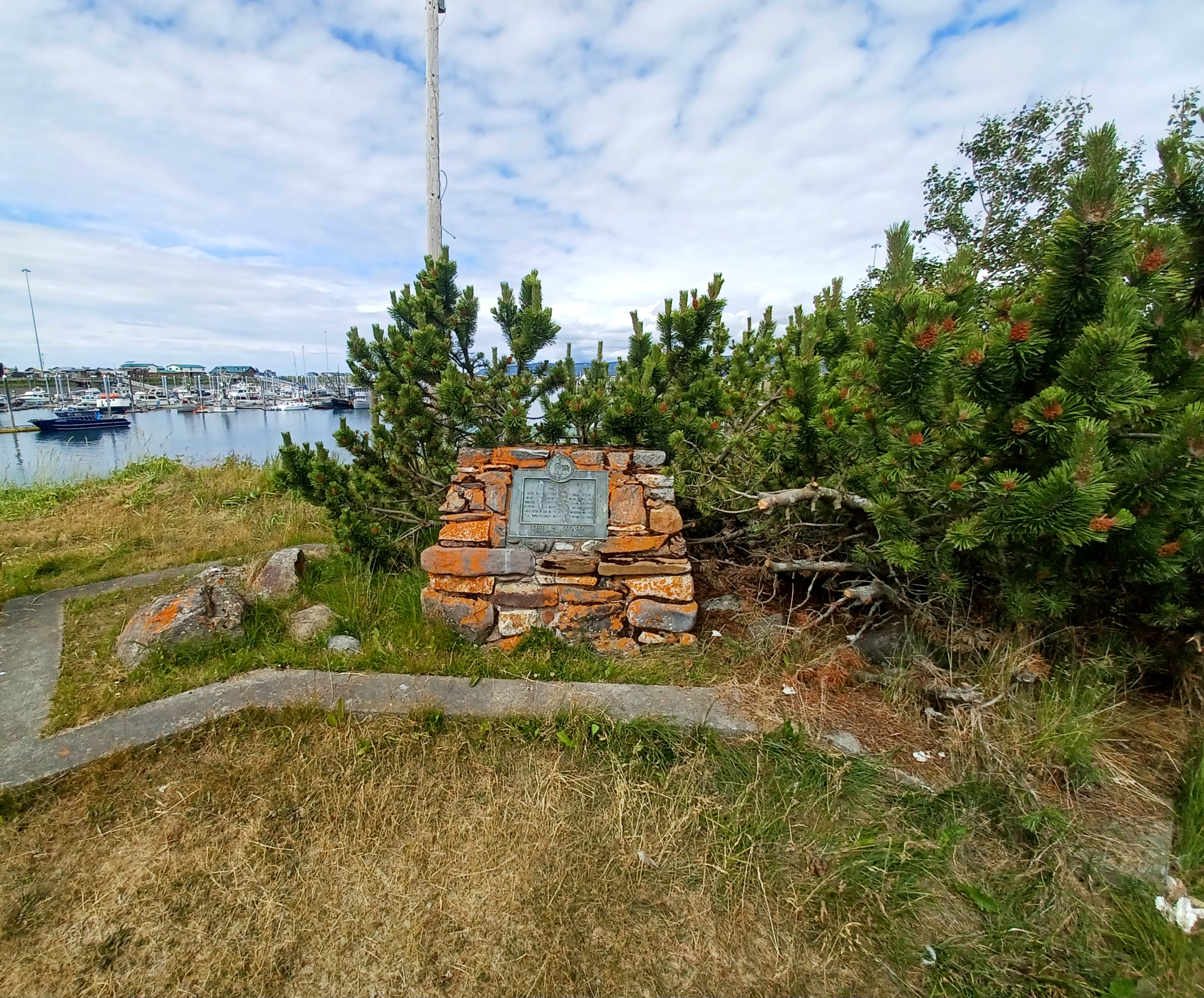
Coal Point Park. The plaque reads, "Coal Point Site of the Cook Inlet Coal Fields Company Roundhouse Railroad shops, and boardwalk with coal-oil lamp lighting system. The original Homer townsite was surveyed by the Land Office of the U.S. Department of the Interior in 1896. State of Alaska Governor Walter J. Hickel, Alaska Centennial Commission."

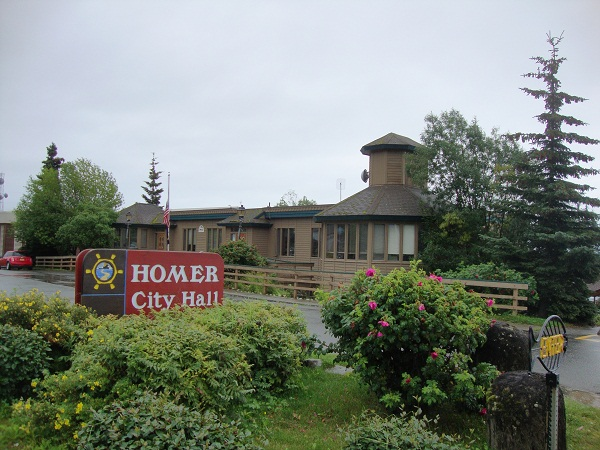
Homer City Hall, located on Pioneer Avenue

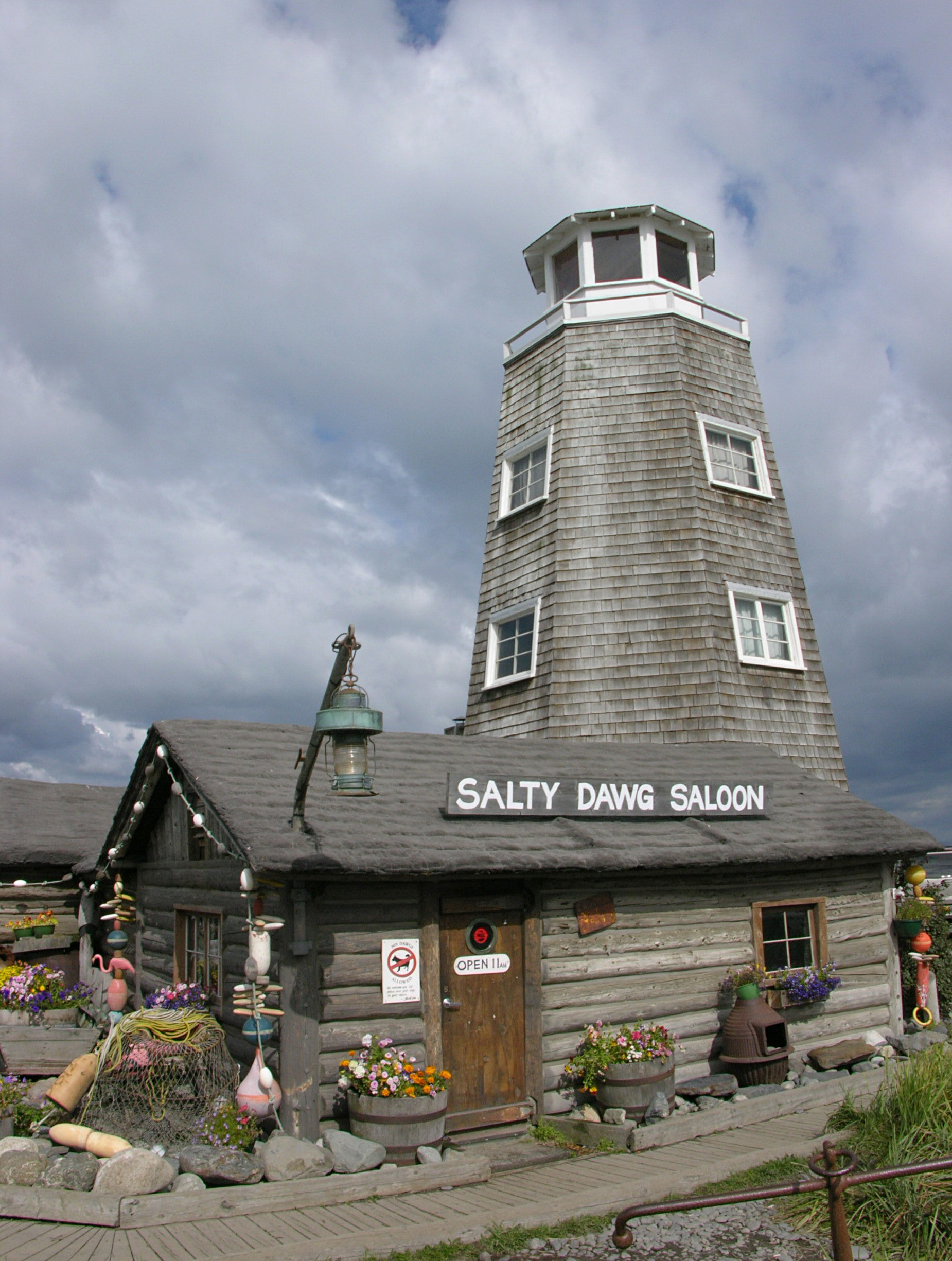
Landmark: the Salty Dawg Saloon

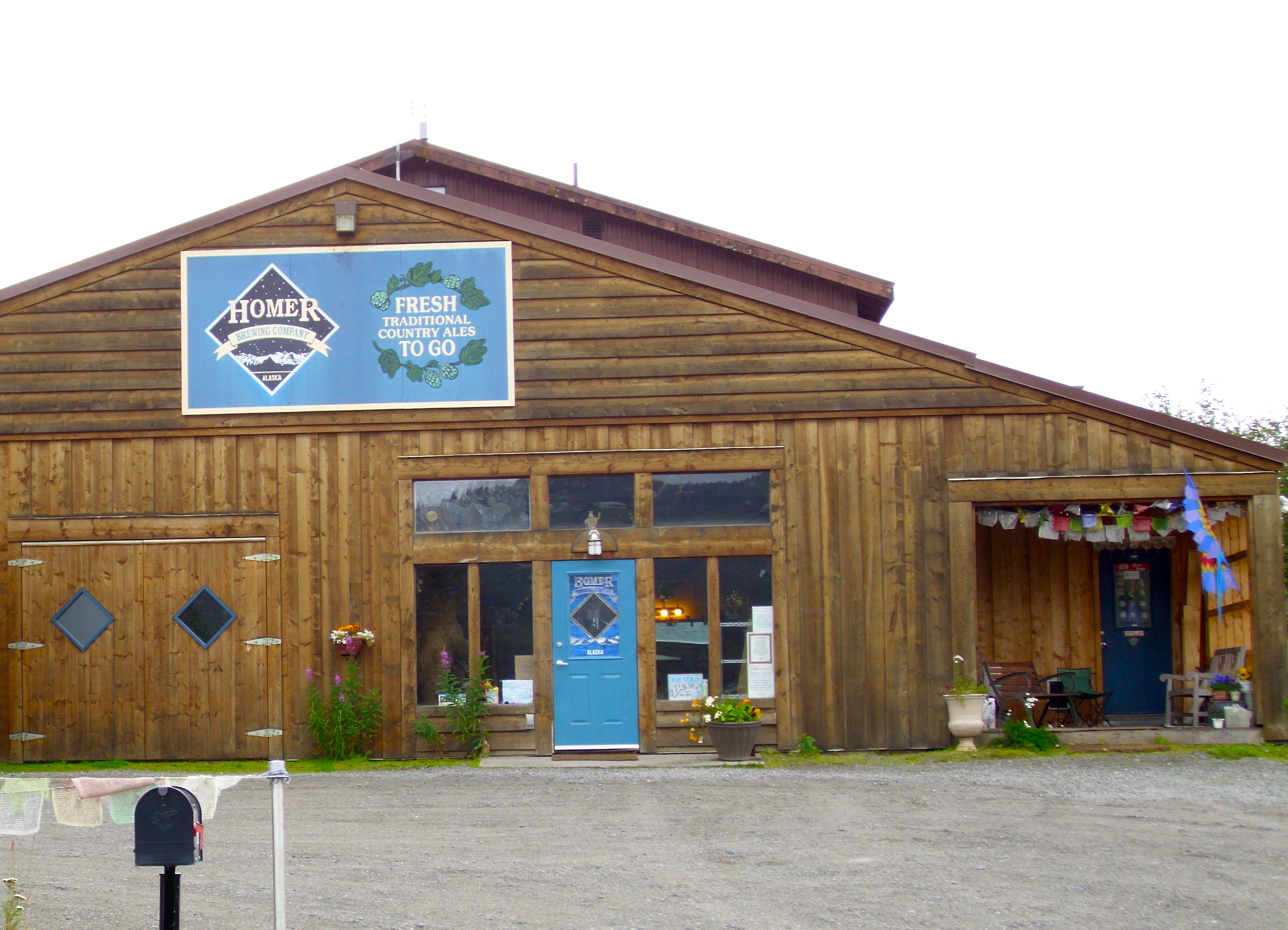
Homer has a winery and a brewery.

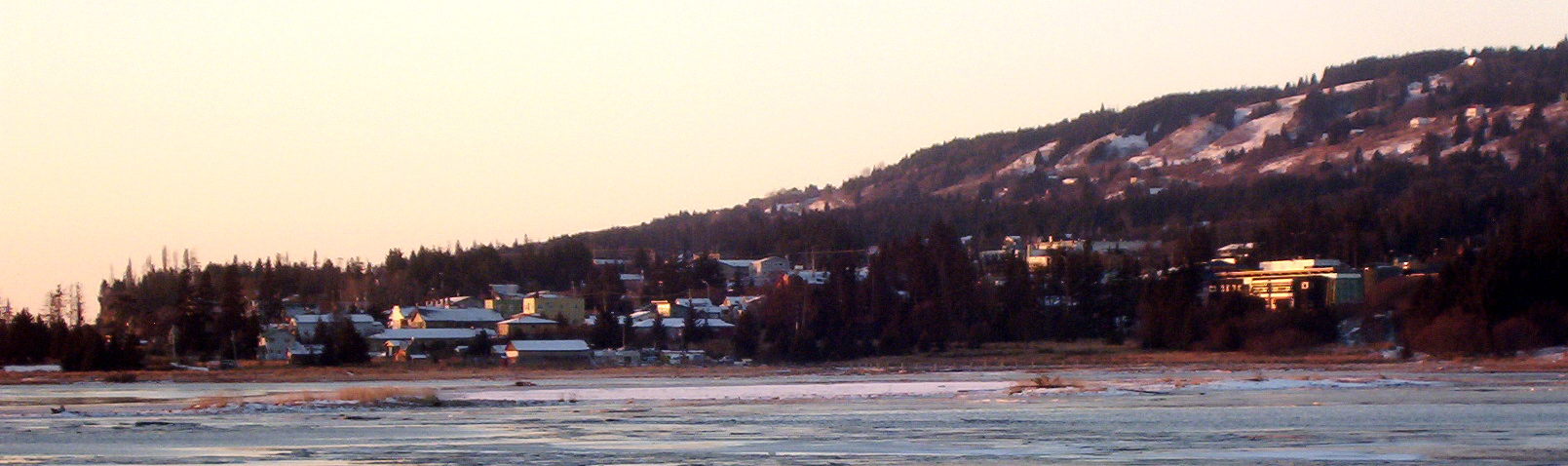
Old Town Homer: Islands and Oceans visitor center is at the far right.

Tiller digs indicate that early Alutiiq people probably camped in the Homer area, including on the Homer Spit, although their villages were on the far side of Kachemak Bay. The area has been inhabited by humans for around 8,000 years.

Coal was discovered in the area in the 1890s. The Cook Inlet Coal Fields Company built a town, dock, coal mine, and railroad at Homer. Coal mining in the area continued and was the main pillar of the economy until World War II. An estimated 400 million tons of coal deposits were still present in the area as of 1959.

Homer was named for Homer Pennock, a gold mining company promoter, who arrived in 1896 on the Homer Spit and built living quarters for his crew of 50 men and one woman. However, gold mining was never profitable in the area.

Another earlier settlement, Miller's Landing, was named after Charles Miller, who homesteaded in the area around 1915. According to local historian Janet Klein, he was an employee of the Alaska Railroad and had wintered company horses on the beach grasses on the Homer Spit. He built a landing site in a small bight in Kachemak Bay, where supply barges from Seldovia could land and offload their cargos. Miller's landing was legally considered a census-designated place separate from Homer until it was annexed in 2002, but has always been locally considered part of Homer.

Commercial fishing became an important economic activity in the early 1900s, and today halibut and salmon sport fishing, along with tourism and commercial fishing, are the dominant industries. Homer co-hosted the 2006 Arctic Winter Games. The Alaska Maritime National Wildlife Refuge and the Kachemak Bay Research Reserve co-host a visitor center with interpretive displays known as the Alaska Islands and Ocean Visitor Center, and a cultural and historical museum there is called the Pratt Museum.

The Homer coastline was included in the area impacted by the Exxon Valdez oil spill in 1989.

== Demographics characteristics ==
Historical population
Census	Pop.	Note	%±
1940	325		—
1950	307		−5.5%
1960	1,247		306.2%
1970	1,083		−13.2%
1980	2,209		104.0%
1990	3,660		65.7%
2000	3,946		7.8%
2010	5,003		26.8%
2020	5,522		10.4%
2022 (est.)	5,876	▲	6.4%
U.S. Decennial Census

Homer first appeared on the 1940 U.S. Census as an unincorporated village. It formally incorporated in 1964.

=== 2020 census ===
As of the 2020 census, Homer had a population of 5,522. The median age was 42.6 years. 20.7% of residents were under the age of 18 and 22.3% of residents were 65 years of age or older. For every 100 females there were 96.0 males, and for every 100 females age 18 and over there were 92.8 males age 18 and over.

0.0% of residents lived in urban areas, while 100.0% lived in rural areas.

There were 2,384 households in Homer, of which 24.8% had children under the age of 18 living in them. Of all households, 45.4% were married-couple households, 20.2% were households with a male householder and no spouse or partner present, and 28.2% were households with a female householder and no spouse or partner present. About 34.5% of all households were made up of individuals and 14.4% had someone living alone who was 65 years of age or older.

There were 2,851 housing units, of which 16.4% were vacant. The homeowner vacancy rate was 1.7% and the rental vacancy rate was 10.4%.

Racial composition as of the 2020 census
Race	Number	Percent
White	4,587	83.1%
Black or African American	34	0.6%
American Indian and Alaska Native	242	4.4%
Asian	63	1.1%
Native Hawaiian and Other Pacific Islander	14	0.3%
Some other race	70	1.3%
Two or more races	512	9.3%
Hispanic or Latino (of any race)	221	4.0%

=== 2010 census ===
As of the 2010 United States census, there were 5,003 people, 2,235 households, and 1,296 families residing in the city. The population density was 361.7 inhabitants per square mile (139.7/km^{2}). There were 2,692 housing units at an average density of 194.6 per square mile (75.1/km^{2}). The racial makeup of the city was 89.3% White, 4.1% American Indian and Alaska Native, 1.0% Asian, 0.4% African American, 0.1% Pacific Islander, 0.6% from other races, and 4.5% from two or more races. Hispanics and Latinos of any race were 2.1% of the population.

There were 2,235 households, of which 27.2% had children under the age of 18 living with them, 44.3% were married couples living together, 9.3% had a female householder with no husband present, 4.3% had a male householder with no wife present, and 42.0% were non-families. 33.7% of all households were made up of individuals, and 11.0% had someone living alone who was 65 years of age or older. The average household size was 2.21, and the average family size was 2.83.

The median age in the city was 44.0 years. 21.9% of residents were under the age of 18; 6.9% were between the ages of 18 and 24; 22.2% were from 25 to 44; 34.5% were from 45 to 64; and 14.5% were 65 years of age or older. The gender makeup of the city was 49.5% male and 50.5% female.

The median income for a household was $52,057, and the median income for a family was $68,455. Males had a median income of $41,581 versus $37,679 for females. The per capita income for the city was $32,035. About 3.8% of families and 7.9% of the population were below the poverty line, including 11.2% of those under age 18 and 1.4% of those age 65 or over.

== Education ==
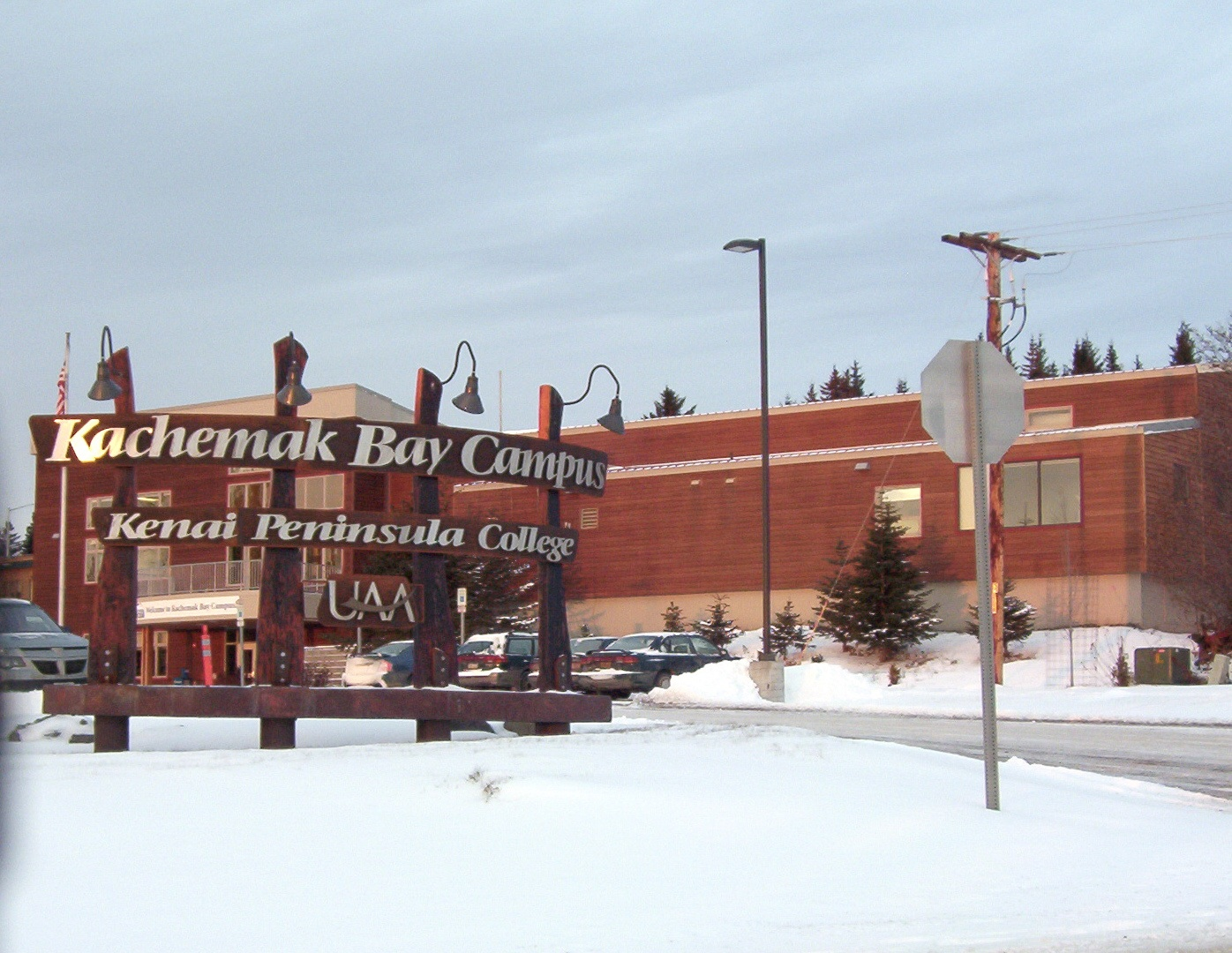
Kachemak Bay Campus seen from Heath Street

=== Schools and library ===
The Kenai Peninsula Borough School District provides primary and secondary education to the community of Homer. These schools are:

- Homer High School (9–12)
- Homer Flex High School (9–12)
- Homer Middle School (7–8)
- West Homer Elementary (3–6)
- Paul Banks Elementary (K–2)
- McNeil Canyon Elementary (K–6)
- Fireweed Academy (K–6)
- Connections Homeschool Program (K–12)

The Kachemak Bay Campus of Kenai Peninsula College provides post-secondary education, as well as ESL and GED training to the community of Homer.

The Homer Public Library has enthusiastic support from the Friends of the Homer Library, established in 1948, which raised funds and support for a new library building, opened on September 16, 2006.

=== Science education ===
Because of the city of Homer's location on the Kenai Peninsula and its abundance of natural resources and marine habitats, there are many public education programs focused on the environment. Some of these educational endeavors include the Alaska Maritime National Wildlife Refuge Visitor Center (also known as the Alaska Island and Ocean Center) and the Center for Alaskan Coastal Studies. Both organizations encourage science education and sponsor many events aimed to teach people of all ages about the ecosystem and conservation. Some of these events include the Kachemak Crane Watch and the Kachemak Bay Science Conference, both sponsored by the Center for Alaskan Coastal Studies.

=== Kachemak Bay Shorebird Festival ===
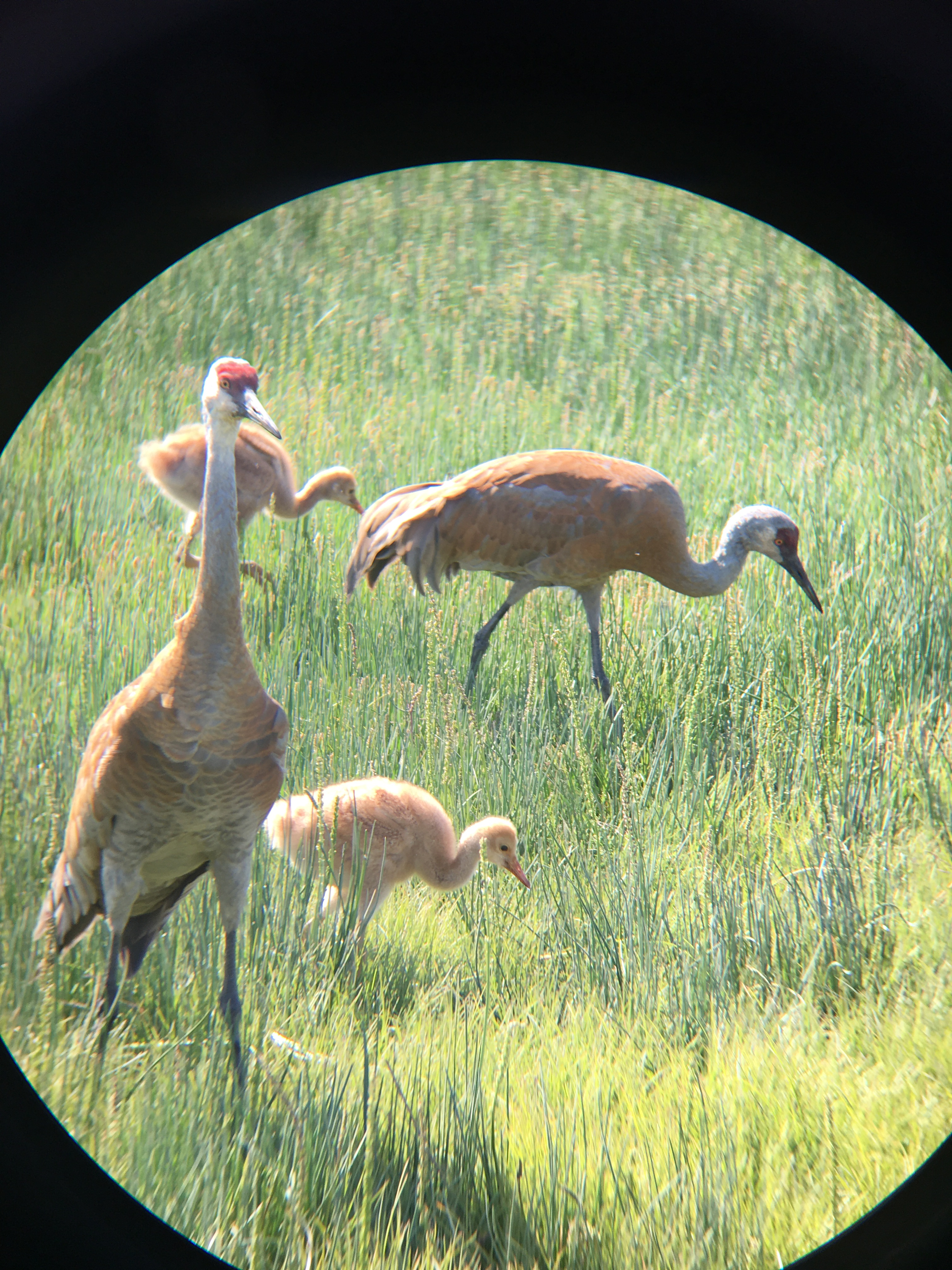
A mated pair of sandhill cranes and their colts as seen through a pair of binoculars

Homer hosts the Kachemak Bay Shorebird festival, which was established in 1993 by a group of Homer residents who wished to educate the public about shorebirds and the wetlands the birds inhabit. Today, the festival is sponsored by Alaska Maritime National Wildlife Refuge and the Friends of Alaska National Wildlife Refuges. The festival is held annually in early May, when more than 13,000 shorebirds from 25 different species visit the Kachemak Bay area during spring migration. Tourists and Alaskans alike attend the festival and are encouraged to watch the shorebird migration through a variety of land and boat tours in collaboration with the festival.

Some birds seen during the spring migration and the festival include horned puffins, sandhill cranes, and arctic terns. Arctic terns are famous for flying the longest distance of any migrating bird. Many of the birds seen during the festival can be identified with the help of published guides that categorize distinguishable features such as, topography, silhouette, size, and color. The festival also includes the Shorebirds Sing: Bird Call Contest, where contestants compete to mimic the calls of various bird species.

In 2020, the festival was held entirely virtually due to the COVID-19 pandemic, and all presentations, speeches, and events were conducted online. The 2021 festival was held both in person and virtually, with events taking place online and face-to-face.

== Media ==
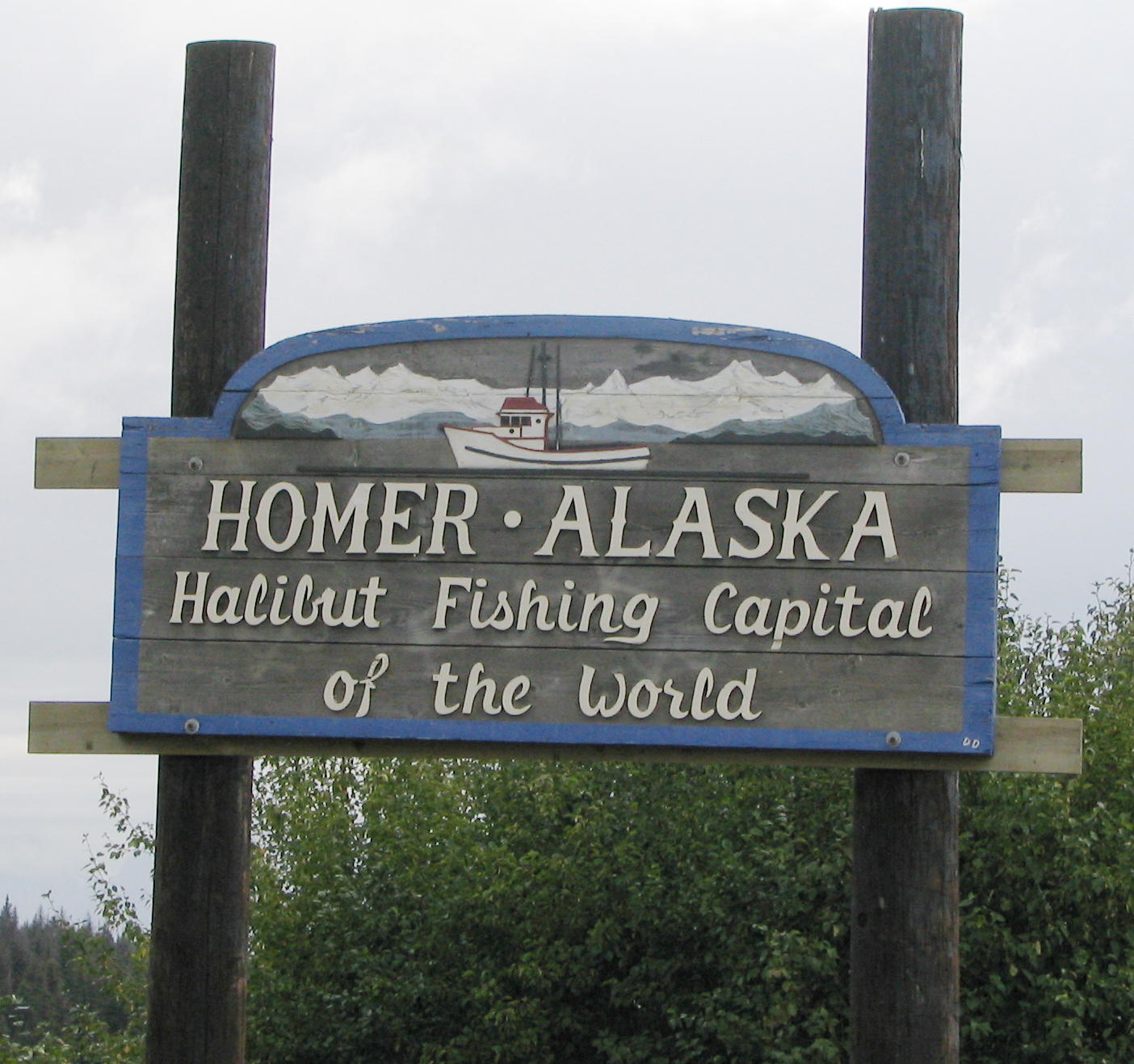
Homer welcome sign

Homer has one newspaper, the Homer News, a weekly paper founded in 1964. It has been owned by Carpenter Media Group since 2024.

Homer has a number of radio stations including commercial stations KWVV-FM at 103.5 FM, KGTL at 620 AM, and public radio KBBI at 890 AM.

Homer receives 7 analog television stations: Because the stations are rebroadcast into Homer using repeaters, their channel numbers are not the same in Homer and they were not required to participate in the transition to digital television.

- KTUU-TV Channel 2 – NBC
- KTBY Channel 4 – Fox
- KAKM Channel 7 – PBS
- KAUU Channel 9 – MyNetworkTV
- KTVA Channel 11 – CBS
- KYUR Channel 13 – ABC

== Transportation ==
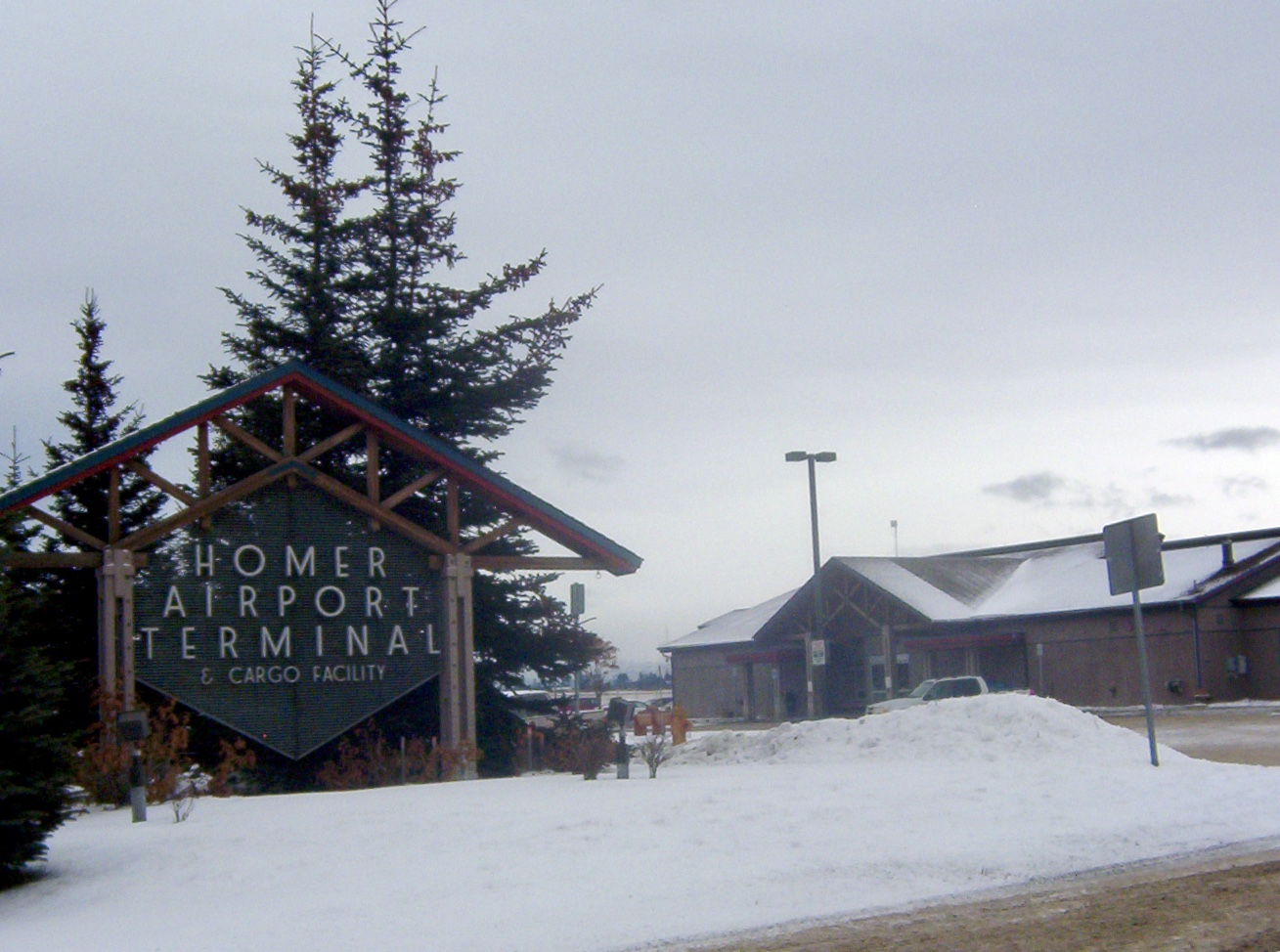
Main airport terminal

Homer is the southernmost town on the contiguous Alaska highway system. It is also part of the Alaska Marine Highway (the Alaskan ferry system). The Homer Airport lies near the coast as well, with local air taxis and regular scheduled commercial flights to Anchorage. Homer erected its first traffic light in 2005.

The United States Coast Guard stations one Island Class cutter in Homer. From 1992 to 2015, the cutter Roanoke Island was assigned to Homer, and was replaced by the cutter Sapelo. Sapelo is scheduled to be replaced by a more modern Sentinel-class cutter.

== Government ==
Homer is governed by a city council consisting of seven members. The current mayor is Rachel Lord.

Elections for local offices were held in October until 2026, when they were moved to November to align with state and federal elections.

== Notable people ==
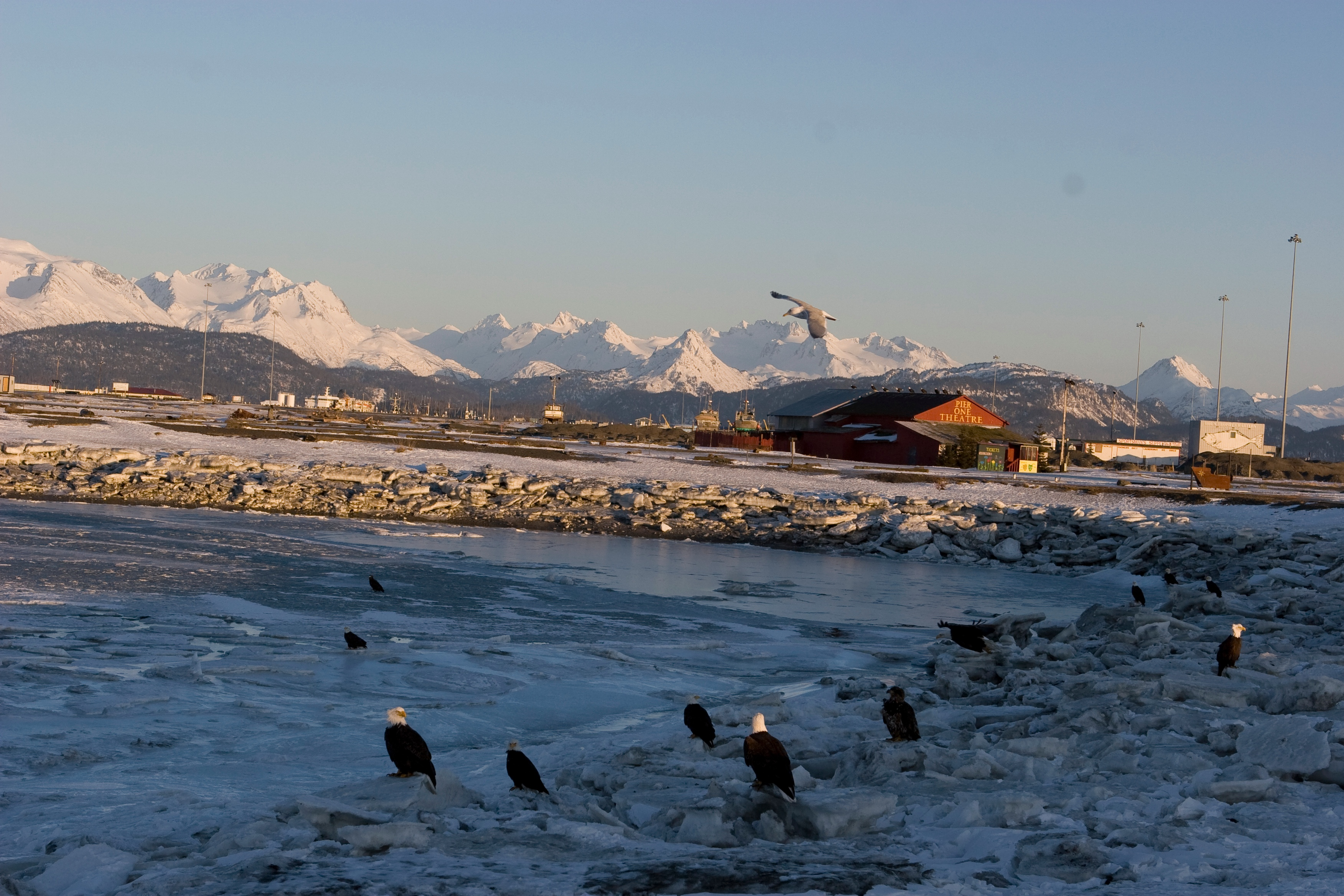
Eagles on the spit in Homer

- Tom Bodett (born 1955), spokesperson, known for the Motel 6 "We'll leave the light on for you" advertisements; and writer, known for the whimsical book about Homer, As Far as You Can go Without a Passport
- Lincoln Brewster (born 1971), Christian worship musician
- Kristen Faulkner (born 1992), professional cyclist, and two-time gold medalist in the 2024 Paris Olympics
- Hazel P. Heath (1909–1998), businesswoman; mayor of Homer, 1968–1976
- Jewel (Jewel Kilcher) (born 1974), singer-songwriter
- Jean Keene (1923–2009), the "Eagle Lady" of Homer, known for her decades-long history of feeding bald eagles on Homer Spit
- Andre Marrou (born 1938), was a resident of Homer when he was elected as a Libertarian member to the Alaska House of Representatives in 1984
- Shannyn Moore (born 1970), political writer based in Alaska
- Tela O'Donnell (born 1982), Olympic wrestler
- Ambrose Olsen (1984–2010), male fashion model
- Dana Stabenow (born 1952 Anchorage Alaska), American author

== Sister city ==
- Teshio, Japan, since 1984

== See also ==
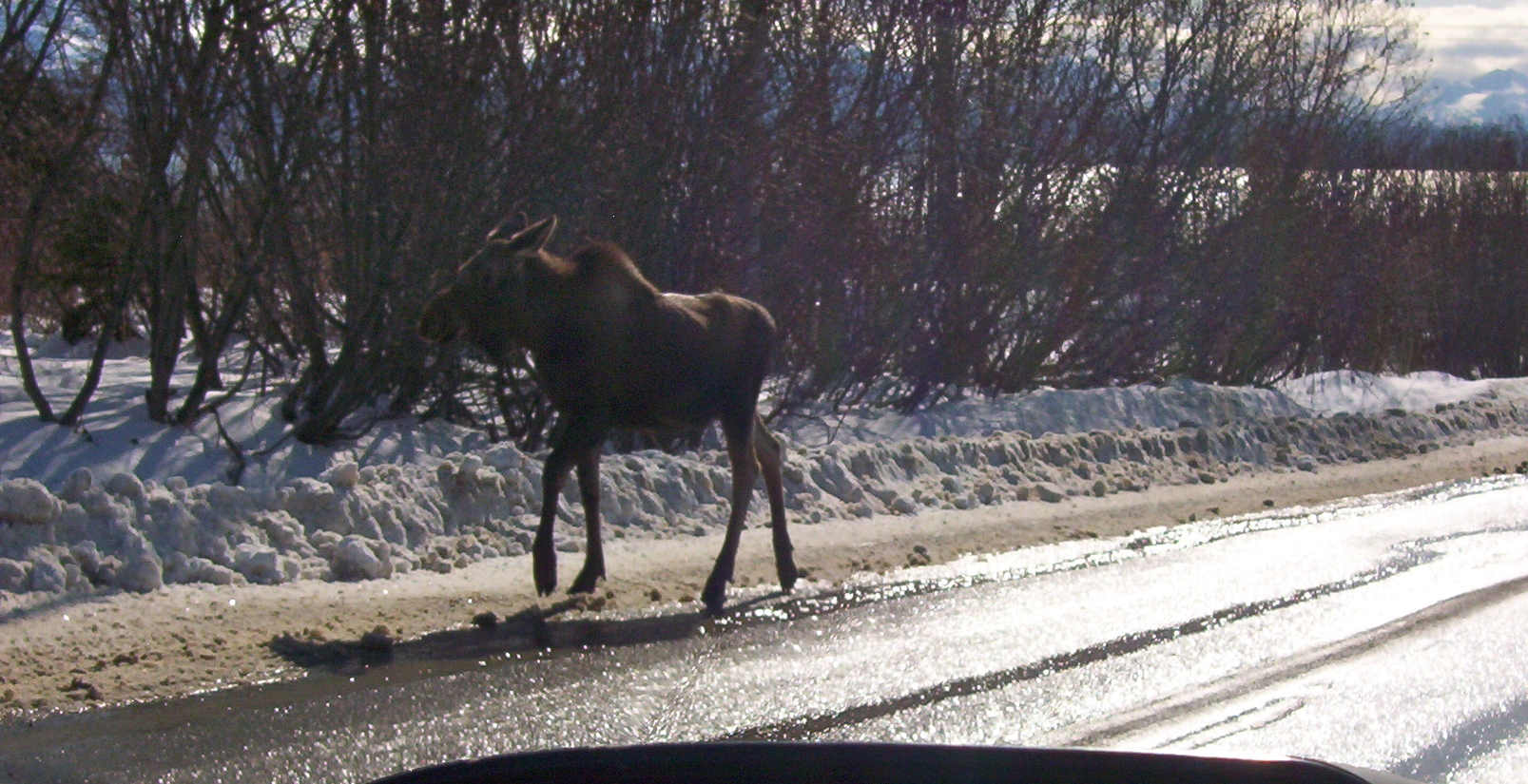
Moose are a common sight on area roads and trails.

- Mile 17 Fire
- Fritz Creek, Alaska
- Diamond Ridge, Alaska
- Kachemak, Alaska
