= Aitkin, Minnesota =

City in Minnesota, United States

- City
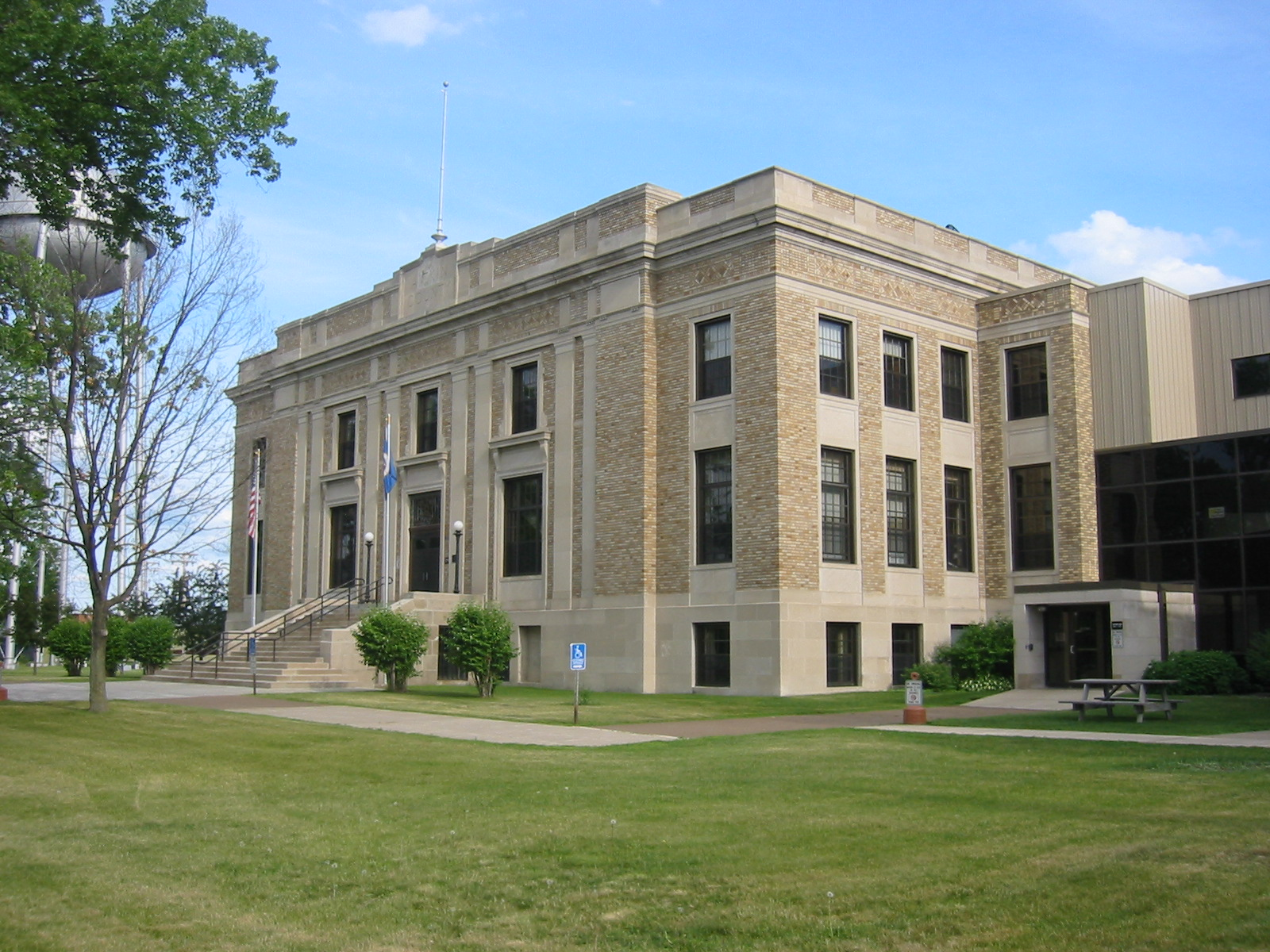
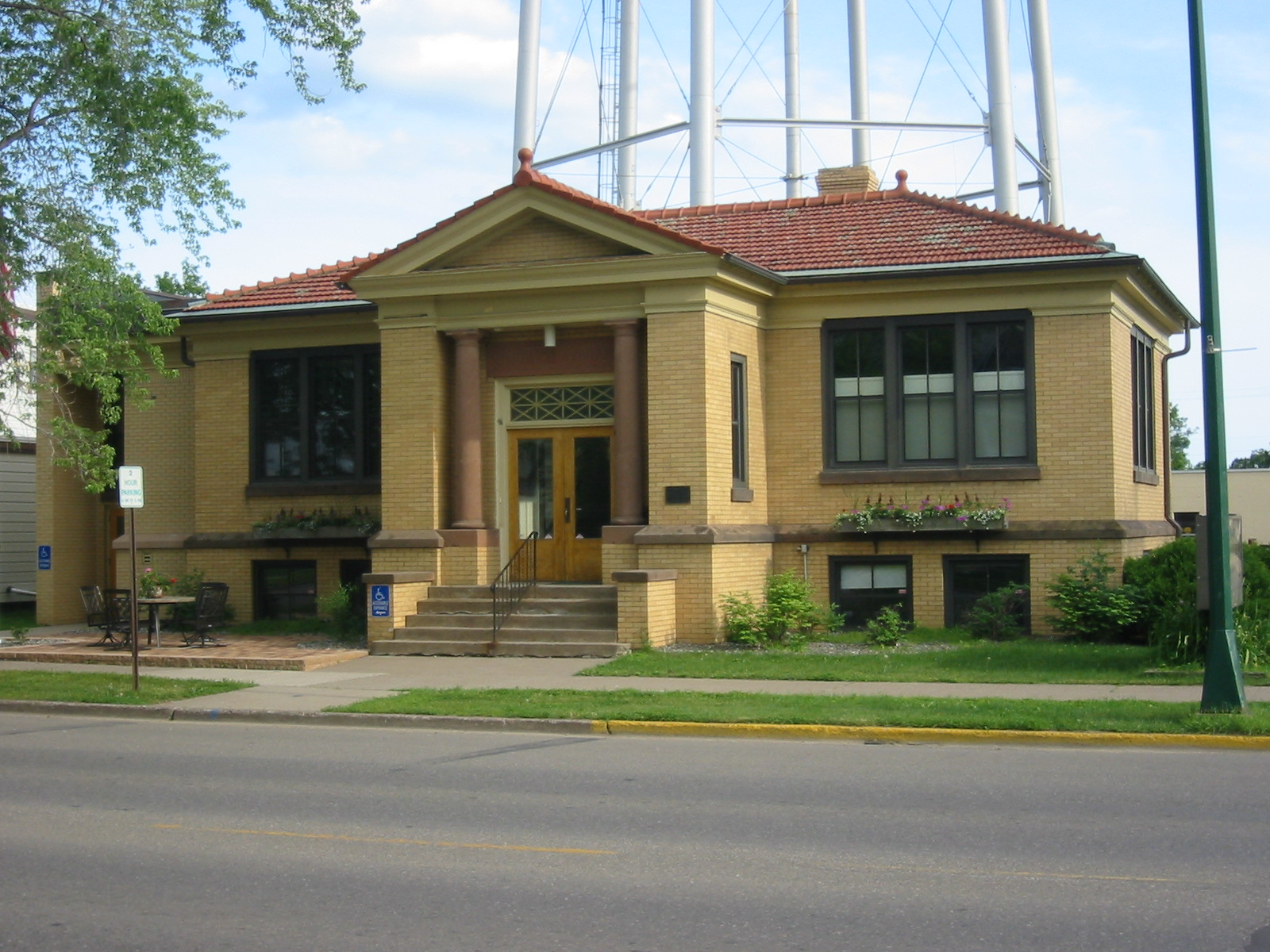
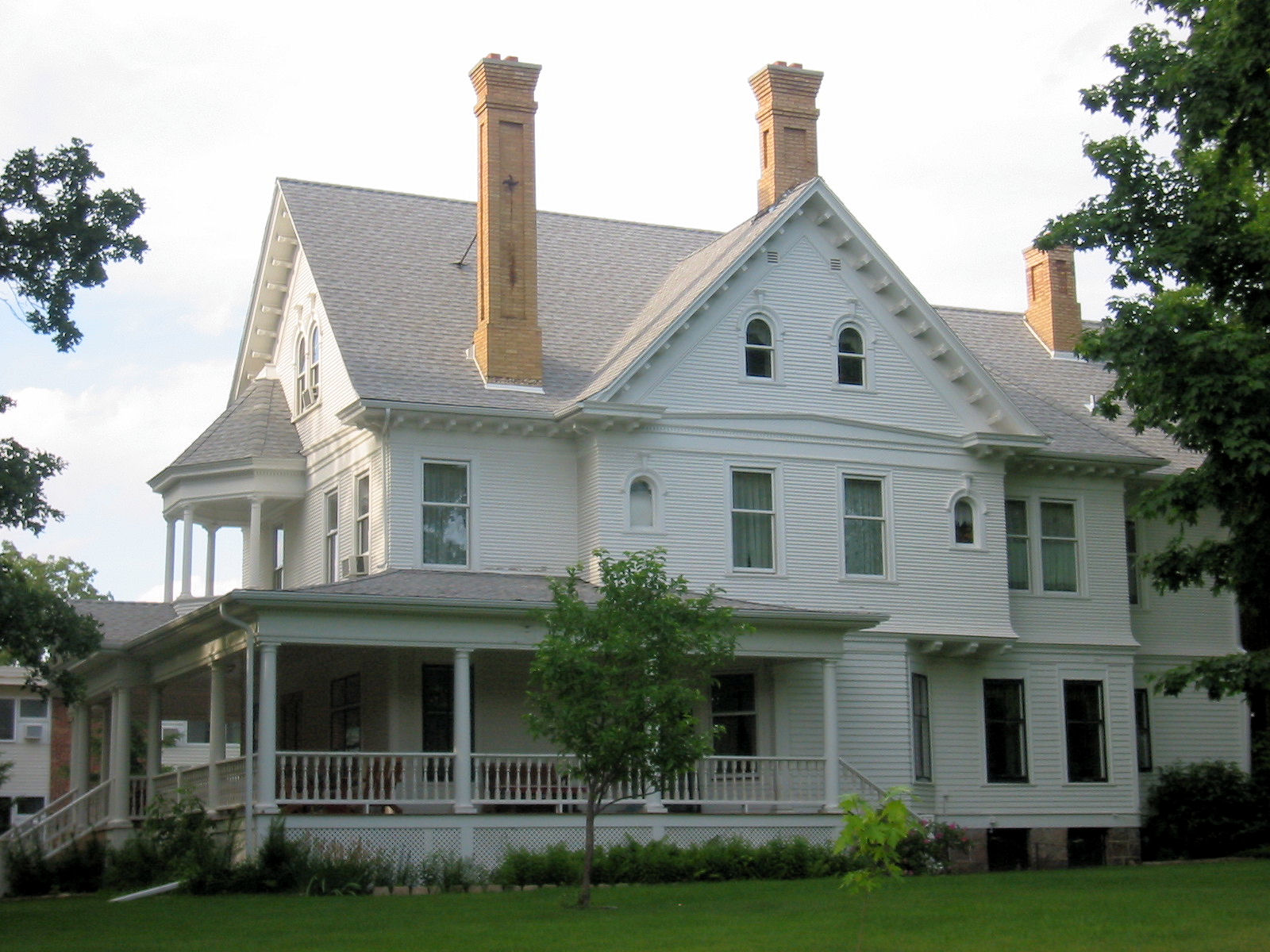
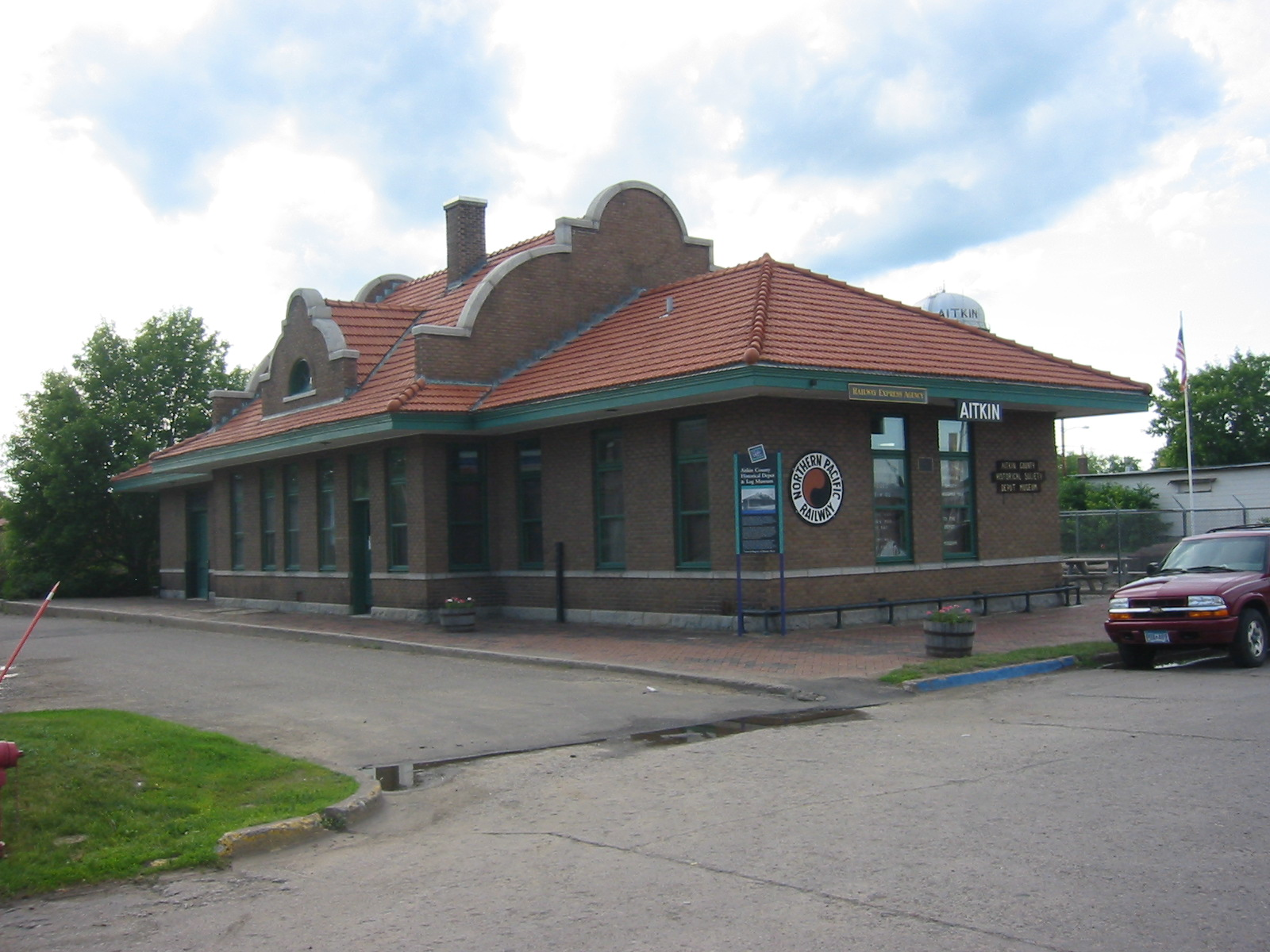
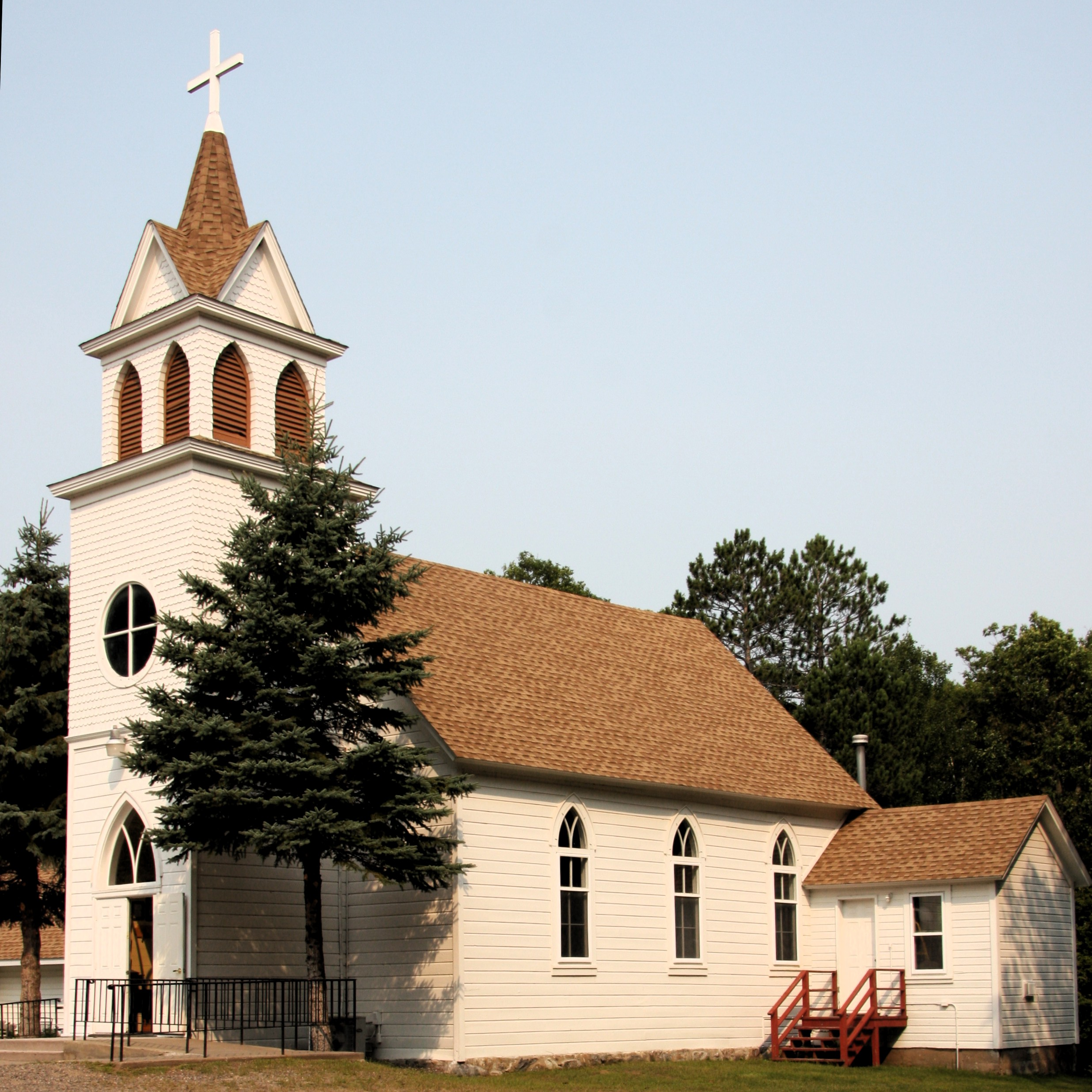
- Aitkin County Courthouse and Jail Aitkin Carnegie Library Patrick Casey House Aitkin County Depot Museum Bethlehem Lutheran Church

- Logo
- Motto: "Historic Mississippi Riverboat Town"
- Location of the city of Aitkin within Aitkin County, Minnesota
- Coordinates: 46°31′35″N 93°42′20″W
- Country: United States
- State: Minnesota
- County: Aitkin
- Founded: 1870
- Incorporated: August 19, 1889
- Named after: William Alexander Aitken

Government
  - Mayor: Gary Tibbets

Area
  - Total: 2.93 sq mi (7.58 km^{2})
  - Land: 2.92 sq mi (7.57 km^{2})
  - Water: 0.0039 sq mi (0.01 km^{2})
- Elevation: 1,234 ft (376 m)

Population (2020)
  - Total: 2,168
  - Density: 742.0/sq mi (286.49/km^{2})
- Time zone: UTC-6 (Central (CST))
  - Summer (DST): UTC-5 (CDT)
- ZIP code: 56431
- Area code: 218
- FIPS code: 27-00460
- GNIS feature ID: 2393894
- Website: ci.aitkin.mn.us

Aitkin (/ˈeɪkɪn/ AY-kin) is a city in and the county seat of Aitkin County, Minnesota, United States. The population was 2,168 at the 2020 census.

== History ==
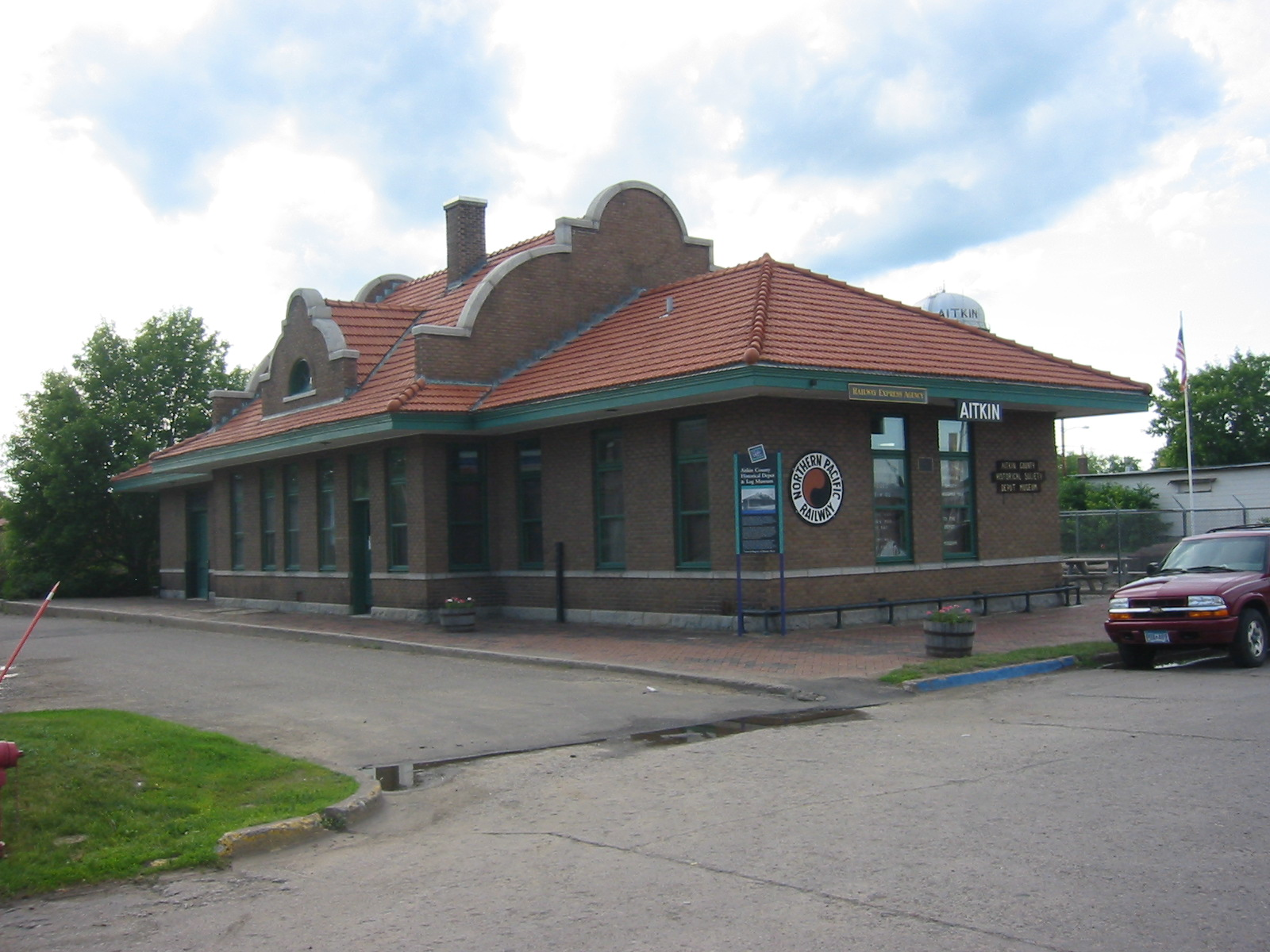
Aitkin County Historical Society Depot Museum

Before the establishment of City of Aitkin, there was a transient community of Lexington at the mouth of the Ripple River, where it meets the Mississippi River. Maps from the 1860s erroneously depict the village of Ojibway at the mouth of the Ripple River.

Due to the importance of regional trade at Lexington, the Northern Pacific Railroad was planned to pass near there. Aitkin was founded in 1870 when the Northern Pacific Railroad was extended to that point, replacing and annexing Lexington. The city and county were named for William Alexander Aitken, a partner of the American Fur Company and chief factor of the company's regional operations in the early 19th century.

The development of industries attracted people to the town. In the late 19th and early 20th century, a massive wave of immigrants, mostly from present-day Ireland, Germany, Scotland, and Scandinavian countries, moved to the area to work in the logging and riverboat industries. They could work before they had learned much English.

After the Great Depression and World War II, the logging industry declined. The area developed as a farming community, based on production of cattle and poultry, which continued until the early 1980s. A creamery and a turkey plant were important to the town's economy. With the decline of small family farms in agriculture, there are many abandoned farms in the county.

By the 1990s, Aitkin had changed again, developing as a community for retirement and tourism, especially with its lake areas. The tourism and service industries are central today. Health care, education, human services, and nonprofit organizations are some of the major contributors to Aitkin's economy, along with the hospitality industry.

Aitkin has been affected by occasional flooding of the Mississippi River. A 1950 flood reached past 20 feet (6 m) and another in 2012 nearly 19 feet (6 m). The 2012 flood was one of the first to overflow into the lake areas, flooding the cabins, as it was caused by heavy rainfall instead of melting snow. In 2023, downtown Aitkin flooded due to record snowfall.

Five properties in Aitkin are listed on the National Register of Historic Places: the 1901 Patrick Casey House, the 1902 Potter/Casey Company Building, the 1911 Aitkin Carnegie Library, the 1916 Northern Pacific Depot, and the Aitkin County Courthouse and Jail (built in 1920 and 1915, respectively).

== Geography ==
According to the United States Census Bureau, the city has an area of 2.20 square miles (5.70 km^{2}), all land.

The Mississippi River flows through the northern edge of Aitkin. The Ripple River and Sissabagamah Creek both flow nearby.

=== Climate ===
Climate data for Aitkin, Minnesota (1991–2020 normals, extremes 1958–present)
Month	Jan	Feb	Mar	Apr	May	Jun	Jul	Aug	Sep	Oct	Nov	Dec	Year
Record high °F (°C)	54 (12)	57 (14)	77 (25)	90 (32)	93 (34)	97 (36)	98 (37)	100 (38)	98 (37)	86 (30)	75 (24)	60 (16)	100 (38)
Mean daily maximum °F (°C)	18.8 (−7.3)	24.6 (−4.1)	36.8 (2.7)	51.5 (10.8)	65.3 (18.5)	74.7 (23.7)	79.1 (26.2)	76.9 (24.9)	68.6 (20.3)	54.7 (12.6)	37.7 (3.2)	24.5 (−4.2)	51.1 (10.6)
Daily mean °F (°C)	9.5 (−12.5)	14.1 (−9.9)	26.1 (−3.3)	40.4 (4.7)	52.7 (11.5)	62.9 (17.2)	67.6 (19.8)	65.3 (18.5)	57.1 (13.9)	44.3 (6.8)	29.8 (−1.2)	17.1 (−8.3)	40.6 (4.8)
Mean daily minimum °F (°C)	0.1 (−17.7)	3.6 (−15.8)	15.4 (−9.2)	29.3 (−1.5)	40.0 (4.4)	51.1 (10.6)	56.1 (13.4)	53.6 (12.0)	45.6 (7.6)	33.8 (1.0)	21.9 (−5.6)	9.6 (−12.4)	30.0 (−1.1)
Record low °F (°C)	−47 (−44)	−43 (−42)	−37 (−38)	−1 (−18)	18 (−8)	27 (−3)	37 (3)	33 (1)	19 (−7)	9 (−13)	−22 (−30)	−42 (−41)	−47 (−44)
Average precipitation inches (mm)	1.09 (28)	0.98 (25)	1.69 (43)	2.82 (72)	3.84 (98)	4.44 (113)	4.74 (120)	3.29 (84)	3.10 (79)	2.93 (74)	1.73 (44)	1.25 (32)	31.90 (810)
Average precipitation days (≥ 0.01 in)	5.3	5.2	6.2	8.1	9.8	10.5	9.8	9.2	8.8	8.7	6.2	5.6	93.4
Source: NOAA

== Demographics ==
Historical population
Census	Pop.	Note	%±
1880	136		—
1890	737		441.9%
1900	1,719		133.2%
1910	1,638		−4.7%
1920	1,490		−9.0%
1930	1,545		3.7%
1940	2,063		33.5%
1950	2,079		0.8%
1960	1,829		−12.0%
1970	1,553		−15.1%
1980	1,770		14.0%
1990	1,698		−4.1%
2000	1,984		16.8%
2010	2,165		9.1%
2020	2,168		0.1%
U.S. Decennial Census; 2020 Census

=== 2020 census ===
As of the 2020 census, Aitkin had a population of 2,168. The median age was 49.8 years. 19.1% of residents were under the age of 18 and 30.8% of residents were 65 years of age or older. For every 100 females there were 81.1 males, and for every 100 females age 18 and over there were 74.9 males age 18 and over.

0.0% of residents lived in urban areas, while 100.0% lived in rural areas.

There were 967 households in Aitkin, of which 21.0% had children under the age of 18 living in them. Of all households, 28.4% were married-couple households, 20.6% were households with a male householder and no spouse or partner present, and 43.1% were households with a female householder and no spouse or partner present. About 49.3% of all households were made up of individuals and 27.3% had someone living alone who was 65 years of age or older.

There were 1,081 housing units, of which 10.5% were vacant. The homeowner vacancy rate was 3.4% and the rental vacancy rate was 7.9%.

Racial composition as of the 2020 census
Race	Number	Percent
White	2,023	93.3%
Black or African American	20	0.9%
American Indian and Alaska Native	42	1.9%
Asian	9	0.4%
Native Hawaiian and Other Pacific Islander	0	0.0%
Some other race	16	0.7%
Two or more races	58	2.7%
Hispanic or Latino (of any race)	30	1.4%

=== 2010 census ===
As of the census of 2010, there were 2,165 people, 936 households, and 483 families residing in the city. The population density was 984.1 inhabitants per square mile (380.0/km^{2}). There were 1,097 housing units at an average density of 498.6 per square mile (192.5/km^{2}). The racial makeup of the city was 95.5% White, 0.8% African American, 1.5% Native American, 0.3% Asian, 0.1% from other races, and 1.6% from two or more races. Hispanic or Latino of any race were 1.2% of the population.

There were 936 households, of which 27.2% had children under the age of 18 living with them, 33.8% were married couples living together, 13.5% had a female householder with no husband present, 4.4% had a male householder with no wife present, and 48.4% were non-families. 43.5% of all households were made up of individuals, and 25.1% had someone living alone who was 65 years of age or older. The average household size was 2.08 and the average family size was 2.88.

The median age in the city was 44.3 years. 22.2% of residents were under the age of 18; 7.2% were between the ages of 18 and 24; 21.4% were from 25 to 44; 22% were from 45 to 64; and 27.1% were 65 years of age or older. The gender makeup of the city was 45.3% male and 54.7% female.

=== 2000 census ===
As of the census of 2000, there were 1,984 people, 892 households, and 434 families residing in the city. The population density was 1,150.3 inhabitants per square mile (444.1/km^{2}). There were 969 housing units at an average density of 561.8 per square mile (216.9/km^{2}). The racial makeup of the city was 97.33% White, 0.15% African American, 1.31% Native American, 0.25% Asian, 0.05% Pacific Islander, 0.35% from other races, and 0.55% from two or more races. Hispanic or Latino of any race were 0.76% of the population. 30.4% were of German, 16.6% Swedish, 12.3% Norwegian and 6.5% Irish.

There were 892 households, out of which 22.5% had children under the age of 18 living with them, 36.5% were married couples living together, 9.8% had a female householder with no husband present, and 51.3% were non-families. 46.5% of all households were made up of individuals, and 30.2% had someone living alone who was 65 years of age or older. The average household size was 2.03 and the average family size was 2.90.

In the city, the population was spread out, with 20.8% under the age of 18, 7.5% from 18 to 24, 21.6% from 25 to 44, 17.6% from 45 to 64, and 32.4% who were 65 years of age or older. The median age was 45 years. For every 100 females, there were 76.2 males. For every 100 females age 18 and over, there were 69.8 males.

The median income for a household in the city was $47,574, and the median income for a family was $58,071. Males had a median income of $50,577 versus $31,641 for females. The per capita income for the city was $26,471. About 7.1% of families and 9.2% of the population were below the poverty line, including 11.0% of those under age 18 and 20.9% of those age 65 or over.

== Arts and culture ==
=== Annual cultural events ===
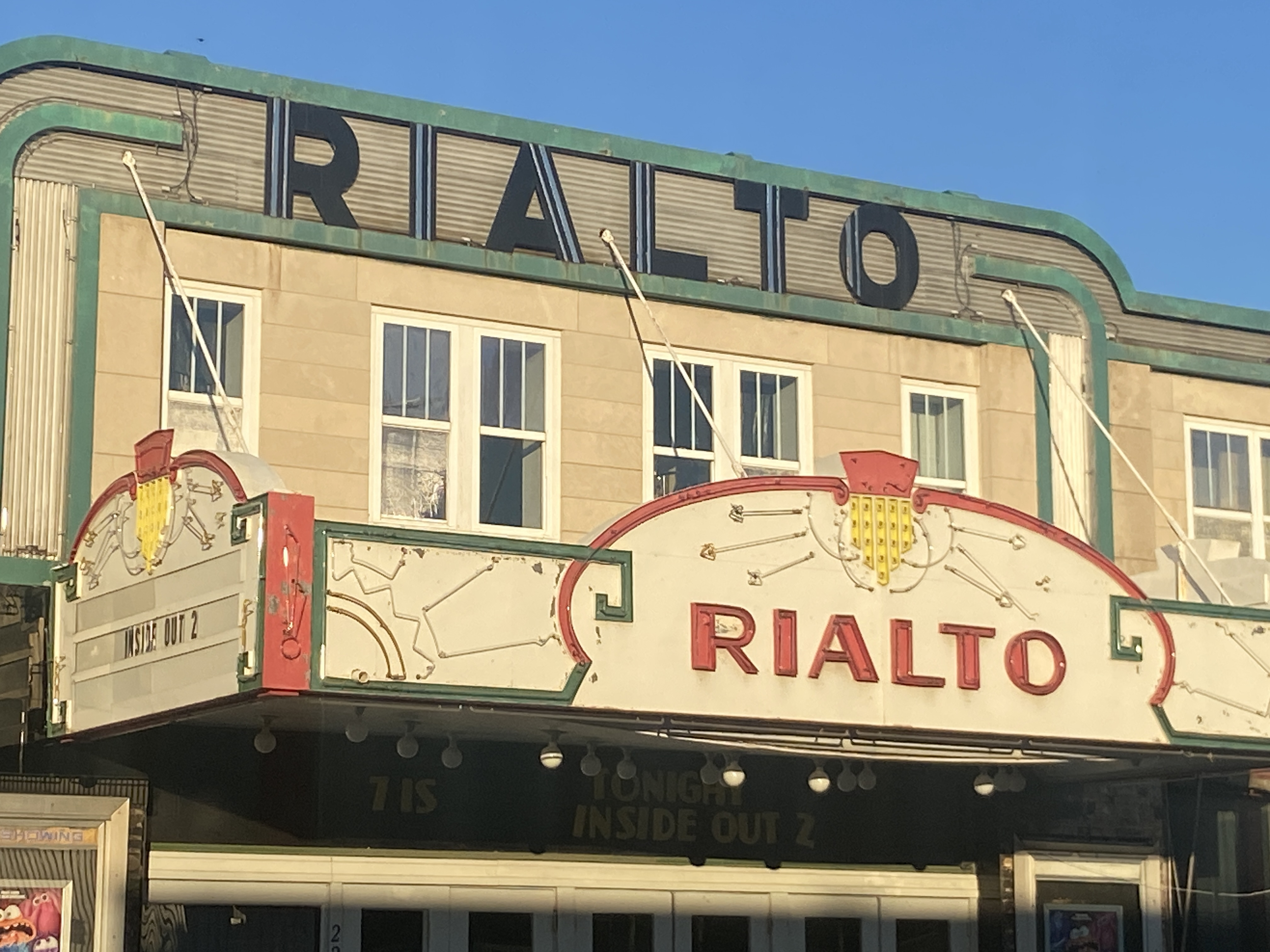
Rialto Theatre

The city's annual festivals include:

- Riverboat Heritage Days, the first weekend in August
- The Aitkin County Fair, the middle of July
- Ripplesippi Music Fest, August
- Harvest Moon Brew Fest, September
- The World Famous Fish House Parade takes place on Black Friday, the day after Thanksgiving. This event was noted in a 2003 documentary that aired on HGTV.

== Education ==
Aitkin Public Schools are part of the Aitkin Public School District. Aitkin High School educates students in grades seven through twelve in the Aitkin School District. Rippleside Elementary educates students grades preschool to sixth grade.

== Infrastructure ==
=== Transportation ===
The Aitkin Municipal Airport is on the northeast side of the city.

==== Major highways ====
The following routes are within the city of Aitkin:

- U.S. Highway 169
- Minnesota State Highway 47
- Minnesota State Highway 210
- Aitkin County Road 1
- Aitkin County Road 12
- Aitkin County Road 15
- Aitkin County Road 41
- Aitkin County Road 54

== Media ==
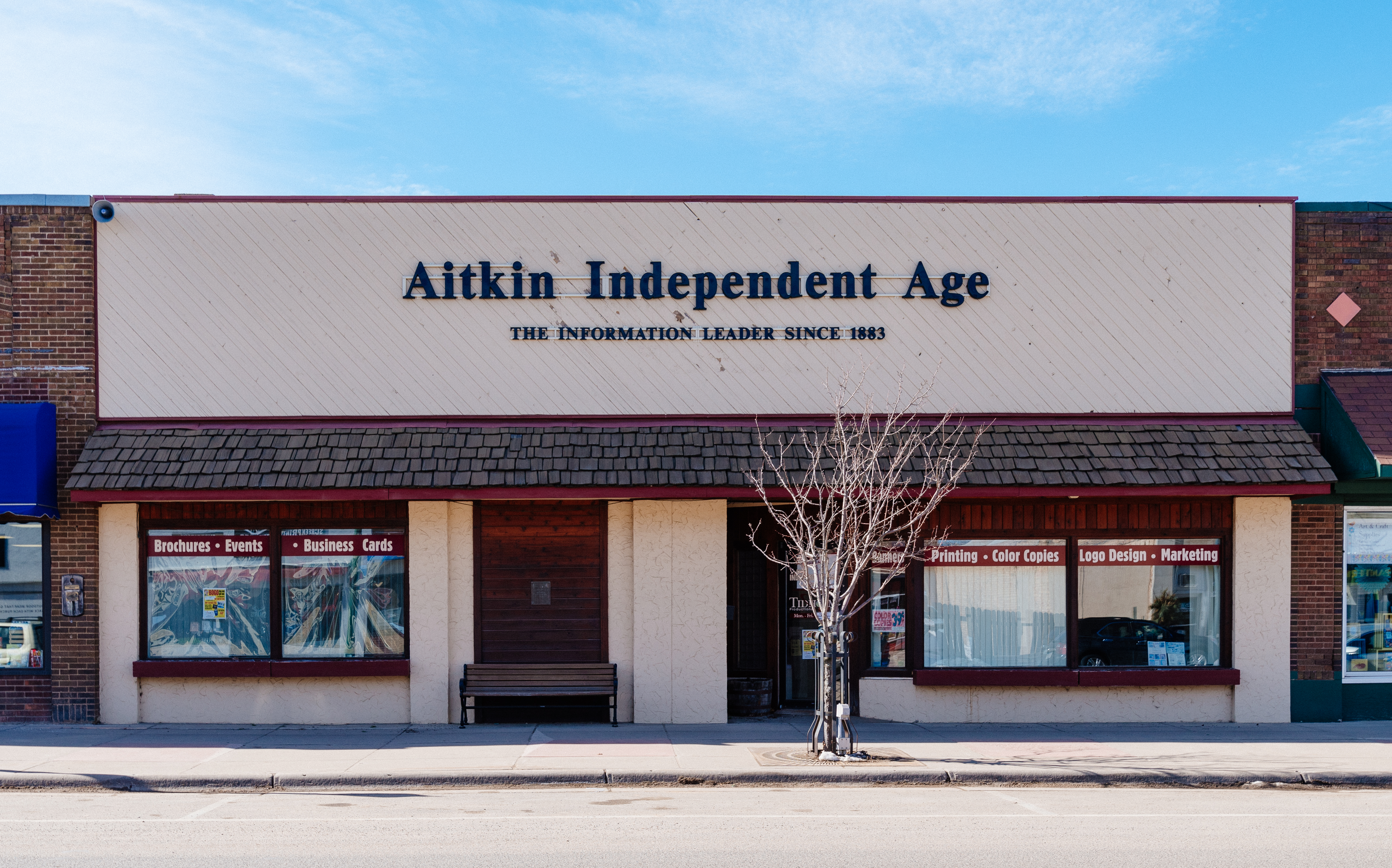
Aitkin Independent Age Newspaper Office

The Aitkin Independent Age is a weekly newspaper in Aitkin. It was founded in 1883.

== Notable people ==
- Franklin E. Ebner, legislator and lawyer
- Jonathan Edwards: singer/songwriter
- Leif Enger: author
- Francis Lee Jaques: wildlife painter
- Jean Keene: the "Eagle Lady" of the Homer Spit
- Robert Kerlan: orthopedic surgeon
- Gordon W. McKay: businessman and politician
- Marlin B. Nelsen, chiropractor and politician
- David E. Rued, politician, farmer, and educator
- Warren William: Broadway and film actor
- Edwin M. Wold, politician and businessman
