= Aitkin County Depot Museum =

County museum in Aitkin, Minnesota

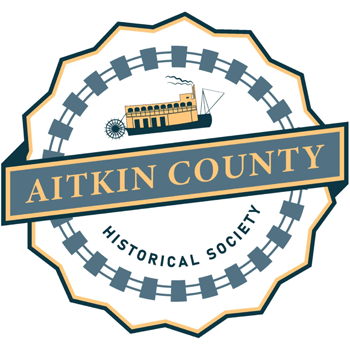

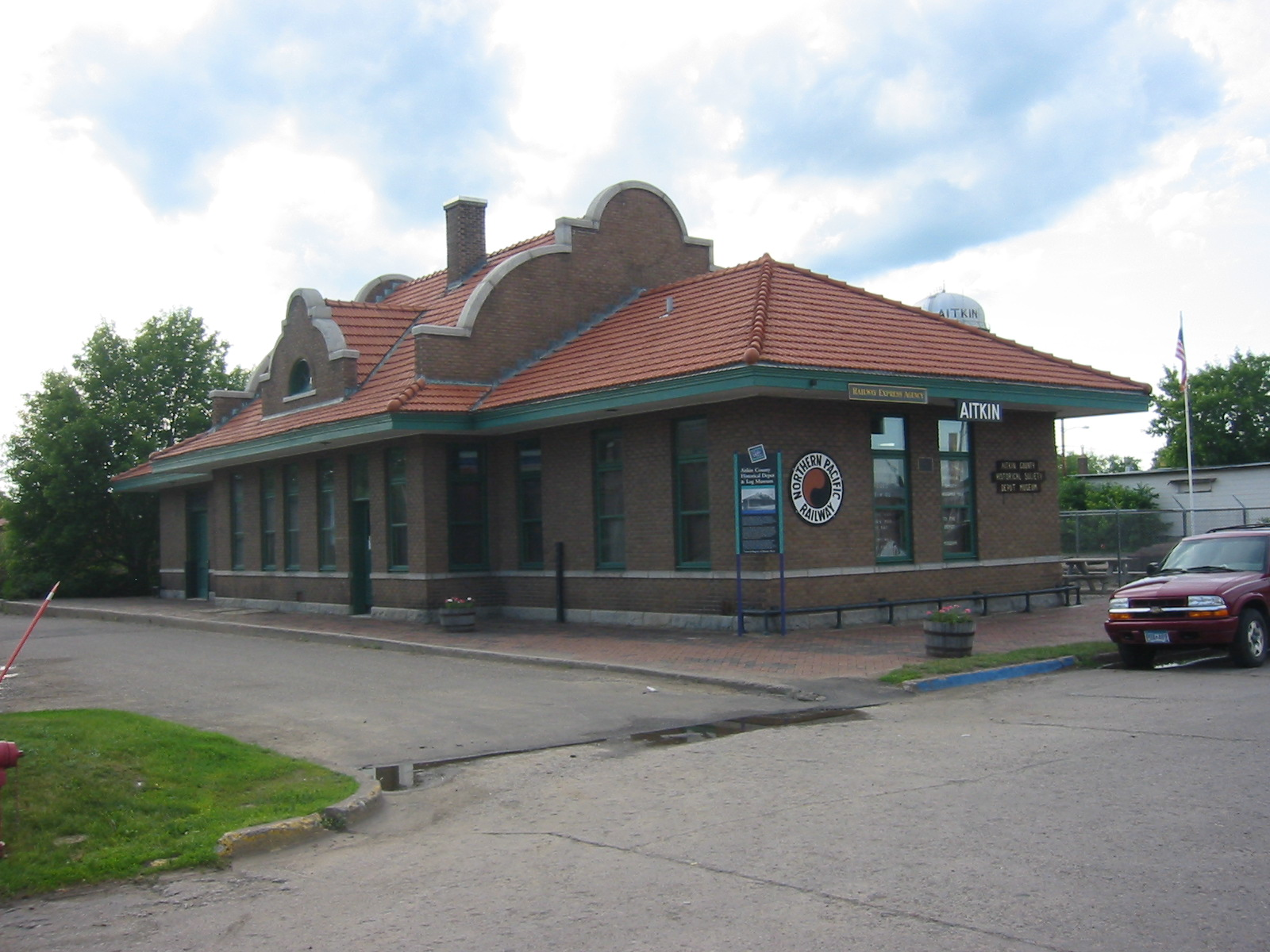
- Aitkin County Depot Museum
- Established: September 4, 1980
- Location: 20 Pacific Street SW, Aitkin, Minnesota
- Type: Local History
- Website: aitkincohs.org

The Aitkin County Depot Museum is a local history museum housed in the historic 1916 Northern Pacific Depot in Aitkin, Minnesota. The building itself is listed on the National Register of Historic Places and is managed by the Aitkin County Historical Society. The museum showcases a range of exhibits, including displays on steamboats, railroads, logging, Native American history, military artifacts, children's toys, woodworking, and agriculture.

== Aitkin County Historical Society ==
The Aitkin County Historical Society was established in 1948 to collect, preserve, and share historical information and artifacts relevant to Aitkin County's history. In 1950 a log cabin museum was built for displays next to the Aitkin County Courthouse.

Following negotiations initiated in 1970, the Burlington Northern Depot was acquired by the organization for conversion into a historical museum and was officially dedicated September 4, 1980. The depot played an important part in the county's and the village of Aitkin's history as the village as established in 1871, coinciding with the railroad's expansion from Duluth. The log cabin then was moved to a spot between the depot and Armory building. When the armory was sold in 2000, the log cabin was moved and its current home at the Aitkin County Fairgrounds. A second building was built next to the depot to house additional displays.

In 2004 the society purchased the local Northwestern Bell Telephone building from the Aitkin Iron Works to use to house artifacts currently not on display.

- Northern Pacific Depot
- U.S. National Register of Historic Places
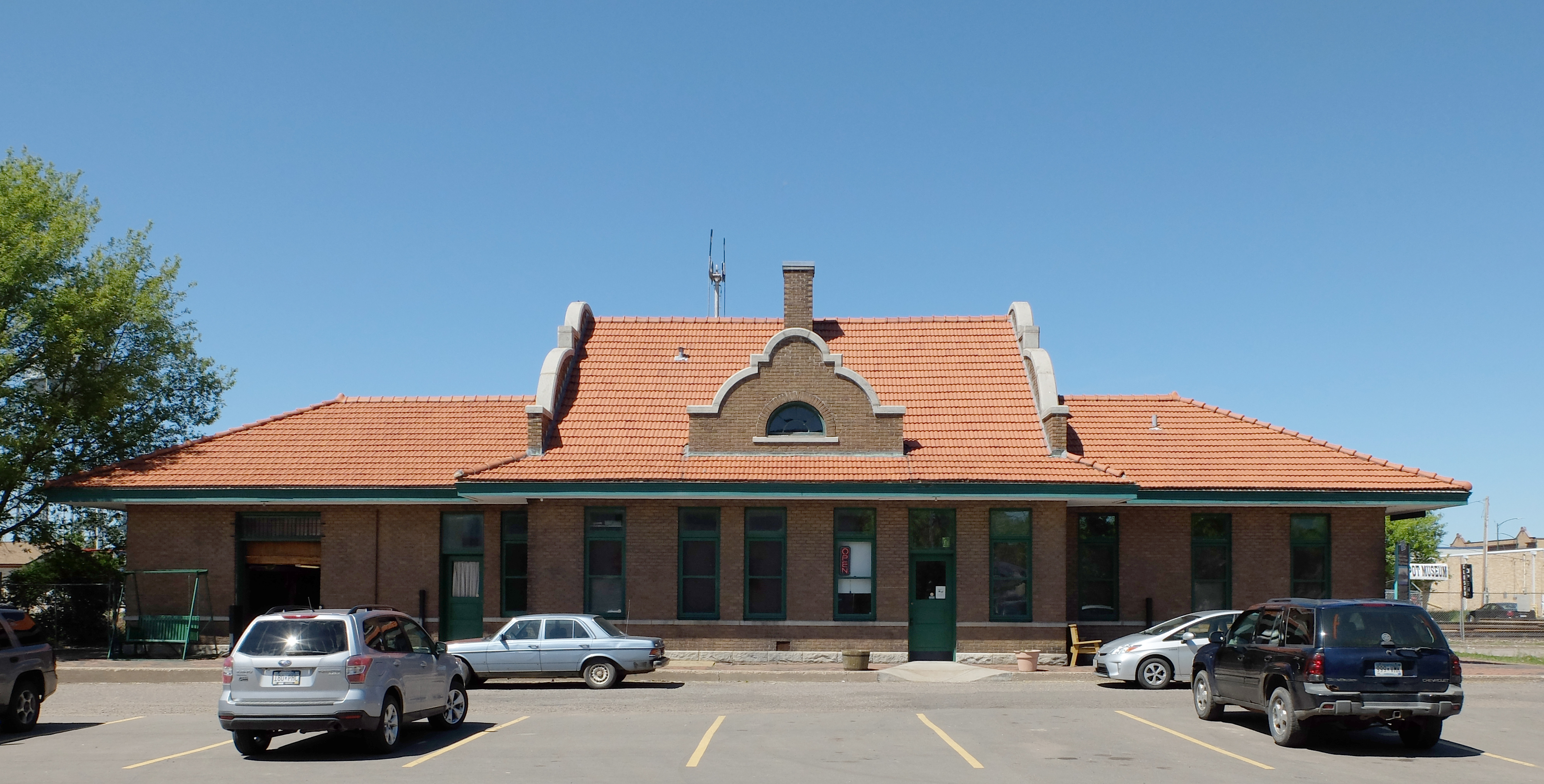

- Location within Minnesota Location within the United States
- Location: 20 Pacific St., SW, Aitkin, Minnesota
- Coordinates: 46°31′54.1″N 93°42′27.1″W
- Built: 1916
- Architectural style: Mission/Spanish Revival
- MPS: Aitkin County MRA
- NRHP reference No.: 82002926
- Added to NRHP: April 16, 1982

== Northern Pacific Depot ==
The railroad line was initially built in 1871. By the early 1900s, Aitkin was emerging as the region's leading supply center, and the old wood-framed depot was considered grossly inadequate. The railway started construction of the new brick depot in 1915. The brick passenger depot was built on the Northern Pacific Railway mainline, opening on January 26, 1916. It was built in the Mission Revival style with cut-stone trimmings and a German tile roof. The station was listed on the National Register of Historic Places in 1982 as the Northern Pacific Depot. The rail line is now part of the BNSF Railway. The depot served as a crucial stop for travelers between Staples and Duluth and symbolizes the importance of the railroad in Aitkin's growth and development.

Passenger train service to Aitkin station ended on May 24, 1969, when trains 57 and 58 were discontinued between Duluth and Staples.

== See also ==
- List of museums in Minnesota

Preceding station	Northern Pacific Railway	Following station
Cedar Lake toward Staples	Staples – Duluth	Rossburg toward Duluth
