= Marlin B. Nelsen =

American politician (1936–1980)

Member of the Minnesota House of Representatives from the 13B district
- In office January 3, 1977 – December 6, 1980

Personal details
- Born: Marlin B. Nelsen Jr. September 18, 1936 North Dakota, U.S.
- Died: December 6, 1980 (aged 44) Gallatin Range, Montana, U.S.
- Resting place: Fleming Cemetery
- Party: Democratic (DFL)
- Spouse: Mary (divorced 1980)
- Children: 3
- Education: Northfield High School
- Occupation: Politician, chiropractor

Marlin B. Nelsen Jr. (September 18, 1936 – December 6, 1980) was an American politician and chiropractor.

Nelsen was born in North Dakota and graduated from Northfield High School in Northfield, Minnesota. Nelsen lived in Aitkin, Minnesota with his wife and family and was a chiropractor. He served in the Minnesota House of Representatives from 1977 until his death in 1980. Nelsen was a Democrat. Nelsen died from a stroke while elk hunting in the Gallatin Mountain Range in Montana.
