= Salty Dawg Saloon =

Saloon bar in Homer, Alaska

Coordinates: 59.601894°N 151.421396°W

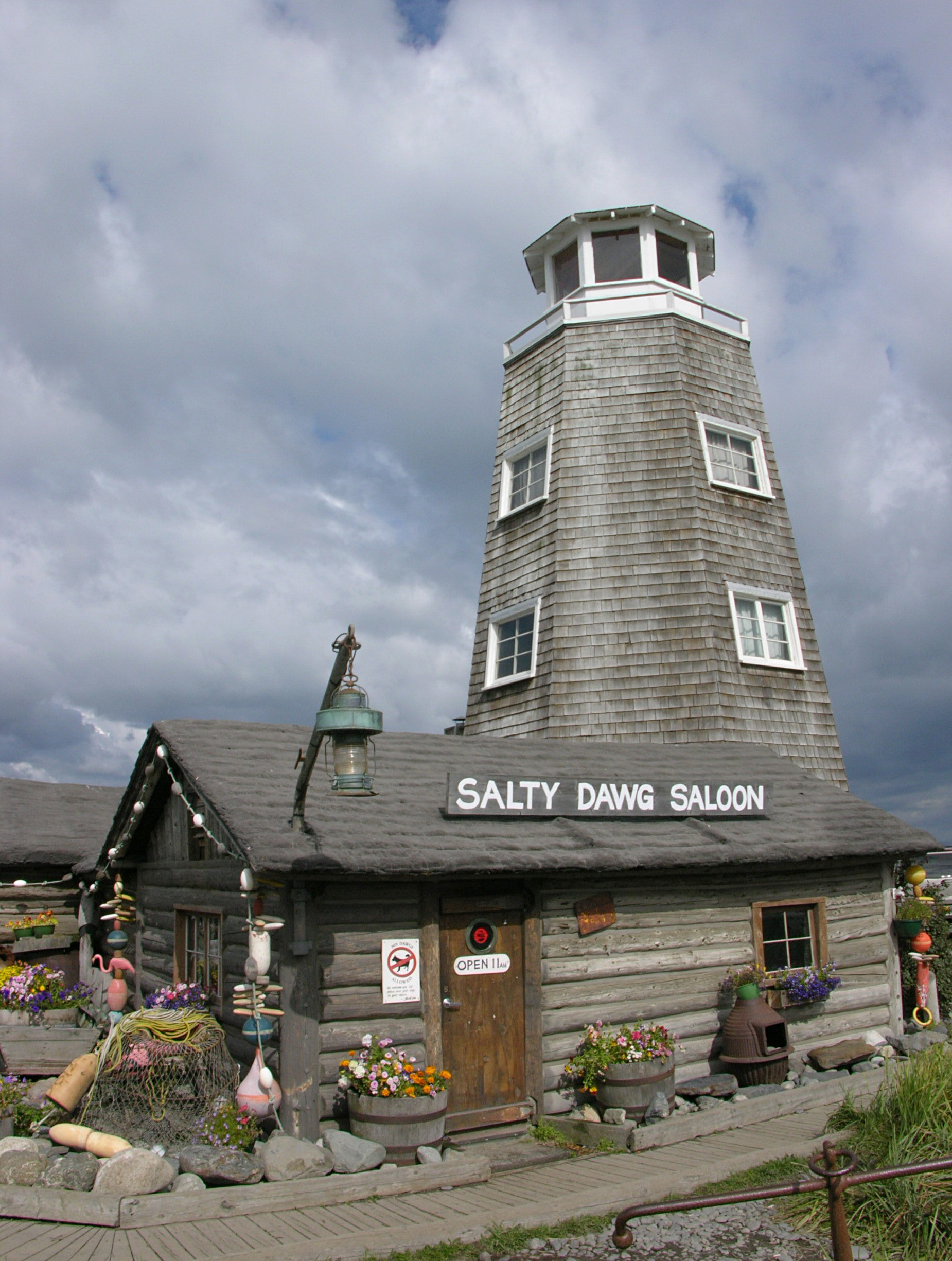
Landmark: The Salty Dawg Saloon

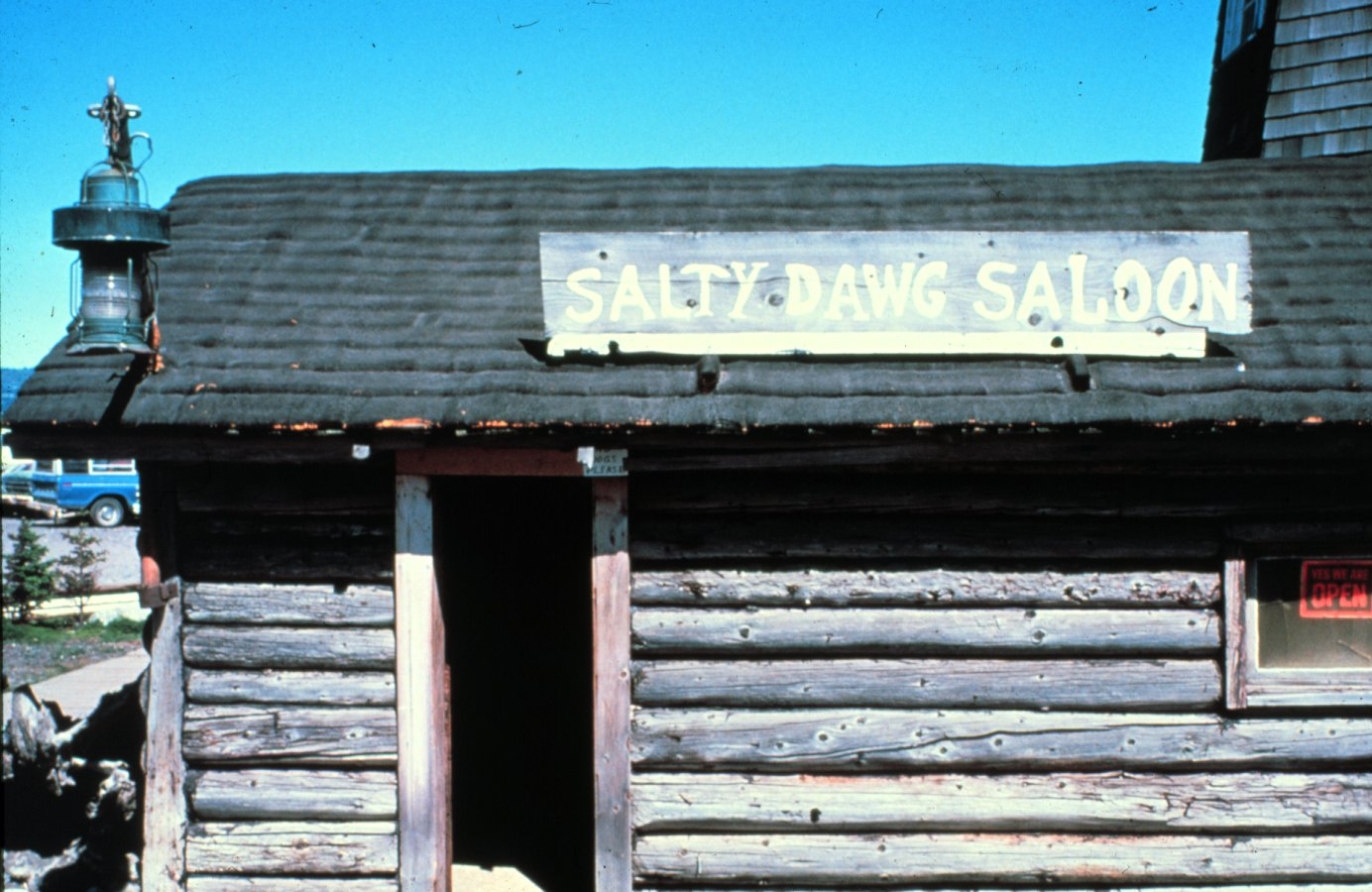
The Salty Dawg Saloon

The Salty Dawg Saloon is a well-known landmark on the Homer Spit in Homer, Alaska.

== History ==
The Salty Dawg originally was one of the first cabins built in Homer in 1897, soon after the establishment of the town site.

It was acquired in the late 1940s by Chuck Abbott. In 1949 Chuck and his friend Gerald Gifford put the cabin on skids and moved it to the Homer Spit. In April 1957, he officially opened it as the Salty Dawg Saloon. By 1960 the Salty Dawg Saloon had a building adjacent to it, coinciding with The Alaska Territory becoming the 49th state of the union in January 1959.

Earl D. Hillstrand (1913-1974), an attorney, small businessman and member of the Alaska House of Representatives, purchased it in 1960. Although an Anchorage resident, Hillstrand had a homestead near Homer and was in the process of developing the nearby Land's End Resort at the time.

The Salty Dawg Saloon is currently owned and operated by John Warren.

The saloon has been featured on Deadliest Catch on the Discovery Channel. The bar is known for the thousands of dollar bills signed by visitors and tacked to the walls. This practice started many years ago, when a visitor tacked a dollar on the wall, explaining that his friend would be by later. The dollar was intended for buying the friend a drink.
