= Edwin M. Wold =

American businessman and politician

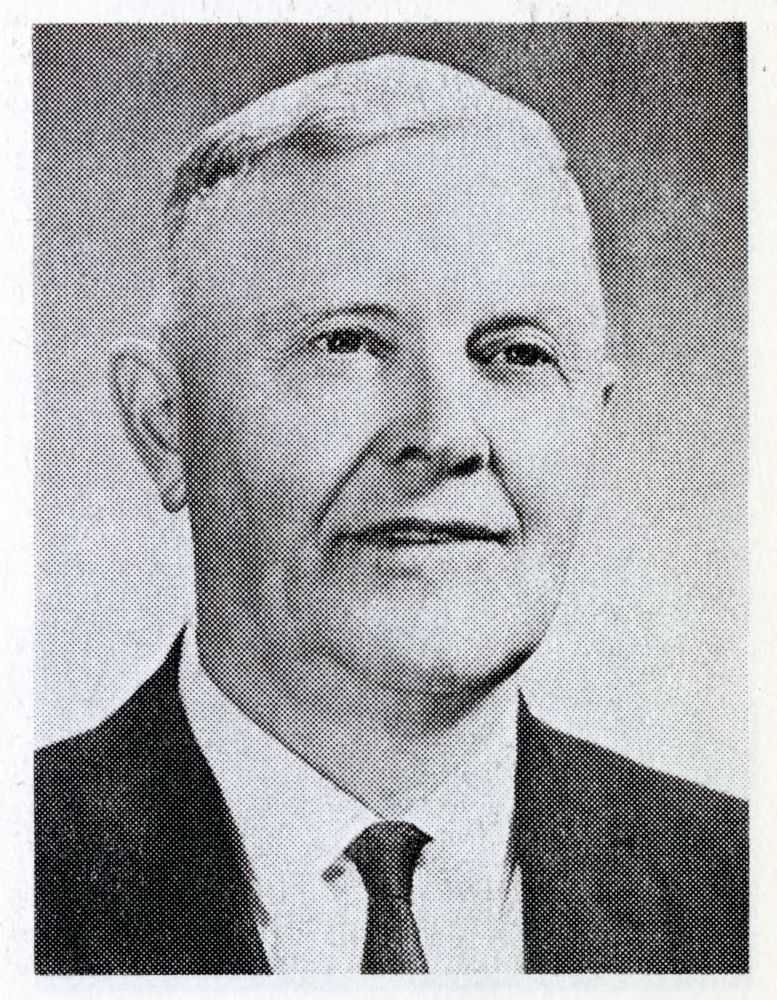

Member of the Minnesota House of Representatives from the 52 district

Personal details
- Born: August 13, 1900 Minneapolis, Minnesota
- Died: August 9, 1987 (aged 86) Aitkin, Minnesota
- Party: Nonpartisan election – Conservative Caucus
- Spouse: Esther Hansen (m. 1924)
- Children: 2
- Occupation: Farm implement dealer, Wold Implement Company

Edwin Marvel Wold (August 13, 1900 – August 9, 1987) was an American businessman and politician.

== Life ==
Wold was born in Minneapolis, Minnesota to Norwegian immigrant parents Peter Wold and Fredrikke Olsdatter Stenvig. He was one of five children: Archie, Edwin, Freeman, Myrtle, and Margaret Wold.

He attended Workman School and completed elementary school through the ninth grade. For higher education, he attended Dunwoody College of Technology in Minneapolis and Little Falls Business College in Little Falls, Minnesota.

Wold married Esther Hansen on September 3, 1924. The couple had two children, Rodger and Beverly.

He lived in Aitkin, Minnesota with his family and owned the Wold Implement Company. He was also a member of the First Congregational Church in Aitkin.

Wold died on August 9, 1987, at Aitkin Community Hospital, at the age of 86. His funeral was held at Brenny Funeral Home in the Sorensen-Root Chapel in Aitkin, and he was buried at Lakeview Cemetery in Aitkin.

== Political career ==
From 1913 to the 1970s, Minnesota legislators were elected on nonpartisan ballots. Legislators ran and caucused as either “Liberals” or “Conservatives,” roughly equivalent in most years to the Democratic-Farmer-Labor and Republican parties.

Wold served in the Minnesota House of Representatives for District 52 from 1963 to 1965 and caucused with the Conservative Caucus.

According to his obituary in the Brainerd Daily Dispatch (August 10, 1987), "He was respected, active and proud to be a Republican."
