= Jean Keene =

Known as the "Eagle Lady" of Homer, Alaska

- Born: Jean Marie Hodgdon; October 20, 1923; Aitkin County, Minnesota
- Died: 13 January 2009 (aged 85); Homer, Alaska
- Children: Lonnie Keene

Jean Keene (October 20, 1923 – January 13, 2009), also known as the Eagle Lady, was a former rodeo trick rider who became the subject of national attention due to her feeding of wild bald eagles on the Homer Spit in Homer, Alaska. Although she had many supporters for the feedings, she was also criticized for drawing a large population of eagles to the area. After her death, the city of Homer passed a law prohibiting the feeding of predatory birds.

== Early life ==
Jean Marie Hodgdon was born on October 20, 1923, in Aitkin County, Minnesota. The eldest of three sisters and one brother, she grew up on a dairy farm in Aitkin, where she helped with farm chores including herding, feeding, and milking cows. She learned to ride horses and became a talented horse breaker and trainer.

In 1952, she was recruited by the traveling rodeo outfit Red River Rodeo as a trick rider, and by the mid-1950s was anticipating an upcoming appearance with Red River at Madison Square Garden. However, her rodeo career was abruptly cut short in a riding accident during a performance at Olympia Arena in Detroit, Michigan. While performing a trick called the "death drag", she missed a handhold after leaning back too far in her saddle. She fell from her horse and was knocked unconscious when her head hit the arena wall. Her foot was still caught in the stirrup, and she was dragged around the arena, tangled in the horse's legs, until other rodeo personnel were able to stop the horse. She suffered 15 fractures in her left knee. After surgery to repair her knee, she spent several months in recovery encased from the waist down in a plaster cast. After the cast was removed, she was still able to walk and ride, but not with the facility needed to perform in the rodeo.

For a time she worked as a professional truck driver hauling cattle. In the late 1950s she married, and gave birth to a son, Lonnie, before divorcing. By the early 1960s she was a single mother. She opened up a dog and cat grooming business and also raised and bred cocker spaniels. She later became the owner and operator of Jolly Chef Truck Stop in Minneapolis, Minnesota.

Keene came to Alaska for the first time in the early 1970s to attend a cousin's wedding. Attracted by the state's beauty, she returned for several visits before making the decision in 1977 to move there — alone. Her son Lonnie was deemed old enough to make his own decisions, and he chose to remain in Minnesota. Keene took a week to drive from Minnesota to Alaska in a secondhand motorhome, ending in Homer, where she parked the motorhome at the end of Homer Spit in the Homer Spit Campground, where it remained for many years. She took a job at a fish processing facility on the Spit, the Icicle Seafoods subsidiary Seward Fisheries, in the spring of 1977, where she later became a foreman.

== Feeding the eagles ==
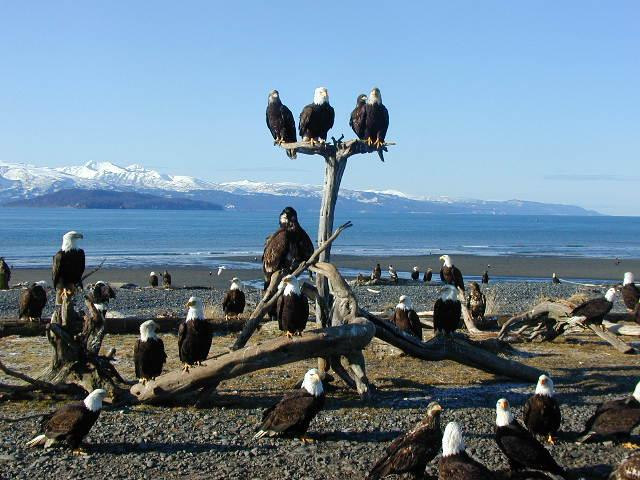
Eagles near Keene's home.

Keene's career as the "Eagle Lady" began shortly after her arrival in Homer, when one morning she noticed two bald eagles on the beach near her motorhome. Keene saw offering food to the eagles as a natural extension of her practice of keeping bird feeders filled with sunflower seeds for wild songbirds. She began to bring home surplus fish in a bucket from her job, and each morning would throw some fish to the eagles over the short driftwood fence she had made around her motorhome. By the end of that spring, a half-dozen eagles were showing up for breakfast. The eagles departed with the arrival of summer, when the Spit became more active with human visitors, but they returned in the winter when tourist season had ended, and Keene resumed the daily feeding.

Within ten years, over 200 bald eagles were visiting during winter and early spring each day, and the job of feeding them became more involved. To have enough fish to last through the winter, she would begin in August to stockpile fish scraps and freezer burned fish donated by her employer and by other local companies. The fish was sometimes supplemented by moose meat that Keene salvaged when she heard of a road-killed moose on the highway. She began feeding the eagles at about December 1 of each year, a job that took up to three hours' work each morning. Keene obtained permission from her employer to use a company forklift to move the large containers of stockpiled fish scraps and freezer-burned salmon, halibut, rockfish, cod, and herring out of the company's large freezers. She then transferred the fish by hand into barrels or garbage cans, which she loaded up in her pickup truck. Then she would drive the load to her motorhome, about 100 yards (91 m) from the Seward Fisheries plant, and cut the fish into fist-sized pieces to be thrown out to the eagles. If the fish was fully frozen, she would use an axe, chainsaw, or blowtorch to break the fish down into smaller chunks, or might even have to lug the large garbage cans into her motorhome to thaw. "I don't know if anyone else would do this," she told a reporter in 1986. "My motorhome smells like fish. My yard is fish. My truck is fish. I am fish. It gets kind of gross sometimes, especially when you're handling a lot of slimy carcasses."

Keene had been persistent in her efforts. In 1985 she broke her leg, but managed to keep to the feeding schedule even on crutches. In the winter of 1994 she was diagnosed with breast cancer and on her doctor's advice underwent a mastectomy. She hired a friend to conduct feeding operations in her absence, but was back to do it herself three days after surgery.

On July 1, 1998, an ammonia leak and explosion at the Seward Fisheries plant caused a fire that led to the evacuation of Homer Spit and the ultimate destruction of the facility, which until then had been the major supplier of fish remains for Keene's feeding operation. But Keene was able to report when winter came that she had found other sources and was ready for the eagles when they returned.

Although the number of visiting eagles fluctuated, about 200 to 300 eagles would show up each day during the months of winter and early spring. Crows and gulls were also attracted to the area. Keene fed them an estimated 500 pounds (227 kg) of fish per day, about 50,000 pounds (22,680 kg) per year. Her fish supply included surplus and freezer-burned fish from fish processing facilities still on the Spit, her own purchases using her limited funds from Social Security or retirement benefits, or fish contributed by her supporters. Visitors could come and watch the eagles Keene fed on the Spit at no cost, but were asked to stay in their cars for their own safety and for the safety of the eagles.

== Public attention ==
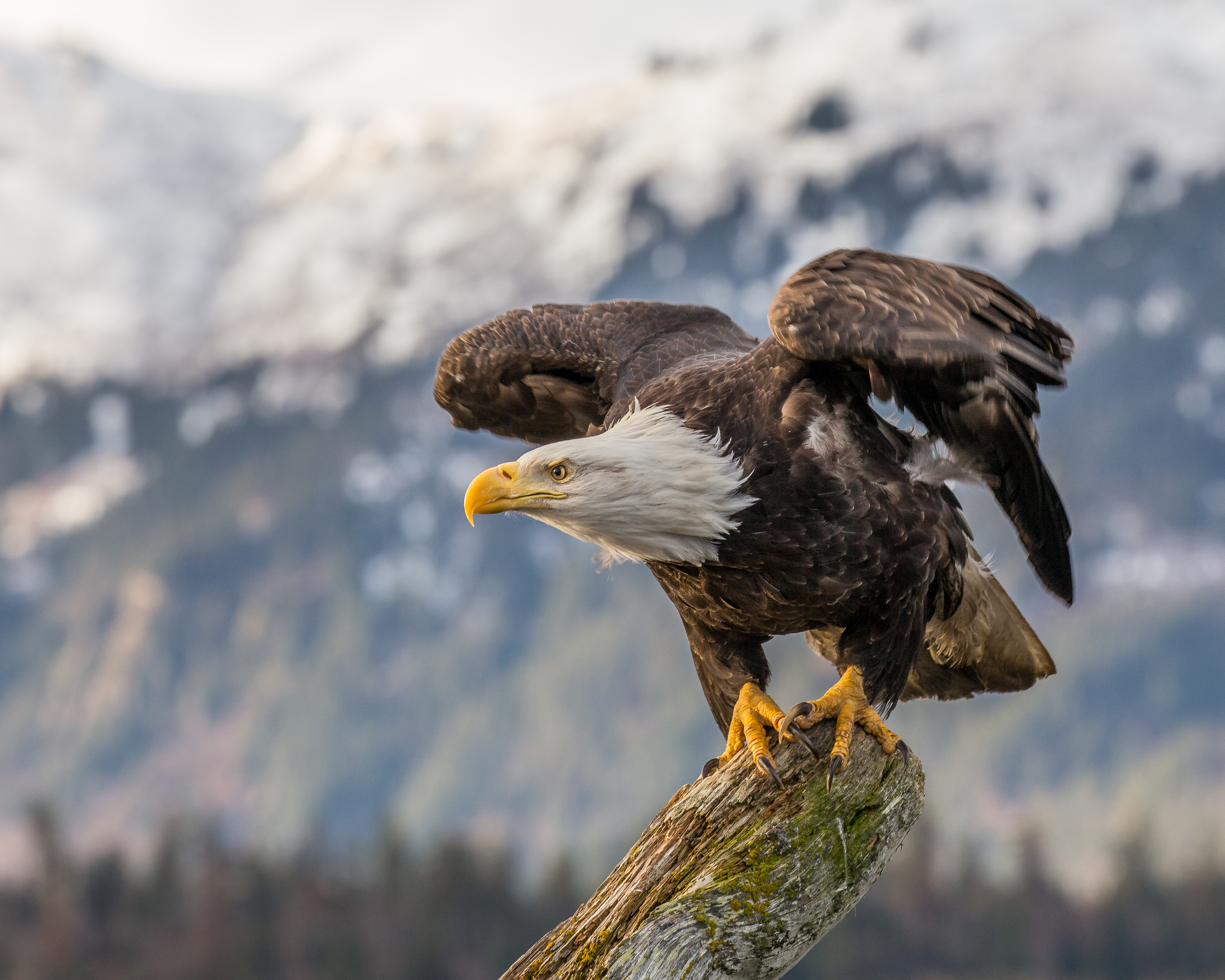
Careful positioning of shots allowed photographers to take pictures on the Homer Spit that appeared to be in a more wild location.

Keene's work has been publicized in Reader's Digest, National Geographic, The Washington Post, People, Life, "Ripley's Believe It or Not!", and on The Rush Limbaugh Show. A 2004 book, The Eagle Lady by Alaska author and photographer Cary Anderson, documents Keene's life and her relationship with the eagles. Keene received the 2004 Lifetime Meritorious Service Award from the Bald Eagle Foundation. Many of Keene's strongest supporters were local hotel owners who got extra business in the normally sluggish winter season, and photographers who were able to use clever framing of shots in order to make it appear they were photographing eagles in the wild. These photographers made enough money from these works that they bought Keene a new house with some of the profits. The news satire program The Daily Show reported on its April 17, 2006, edition that Homer had been overpopulated by bald eagles due in large part to Keene's activities. A crew from the show spent two days in March 2006 shooting footage for the show, including a feeding session and interview with Keene and interviews with other Homer residents about Keene and the controversy then in progress about feeding eagles.

== Criticism ==
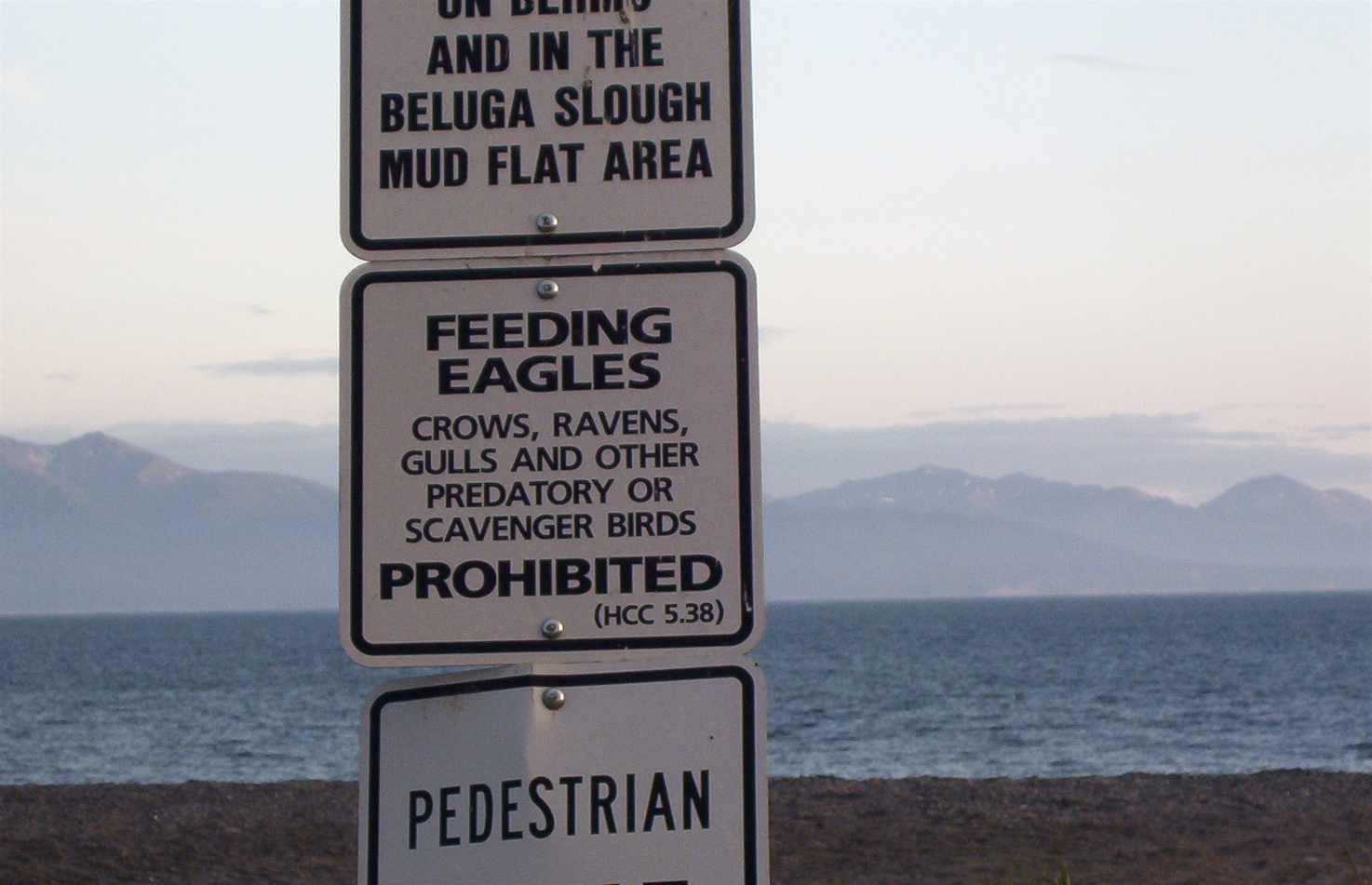
Signs like this were posted on Homer beaches

Some environmentalists were concerned with the large population of eagles drawn to Homer by Keene. They believed some eagles have been harmed due to their familiarity with people. Others were worried about the spread of disease or the change in the birds' natural migrations. Allegedly, some other bird populations in the area, such as sandhill cranes, loons, and kittiwakes, have been driven out or killed by eagles, though there is no direct evidence. In fact, kittiwakes have increased in the area to the degree of founding a new colony close to Keene's home. According to an ABC News broadcast, many Homer residents now consider the birds a "menace", as they have been known to cause car accidents and steal pets. In a few cases, the birds have been shot at. An ordinance passed by the Homer City Council in 2006 prohibits the feeding of eagles within the city limits; however, the city council granted Keene an exemption, giving her special permission to continue feeding bald eagles within city limits until April 2010, at which time Keene would have been 86.

== Death ==
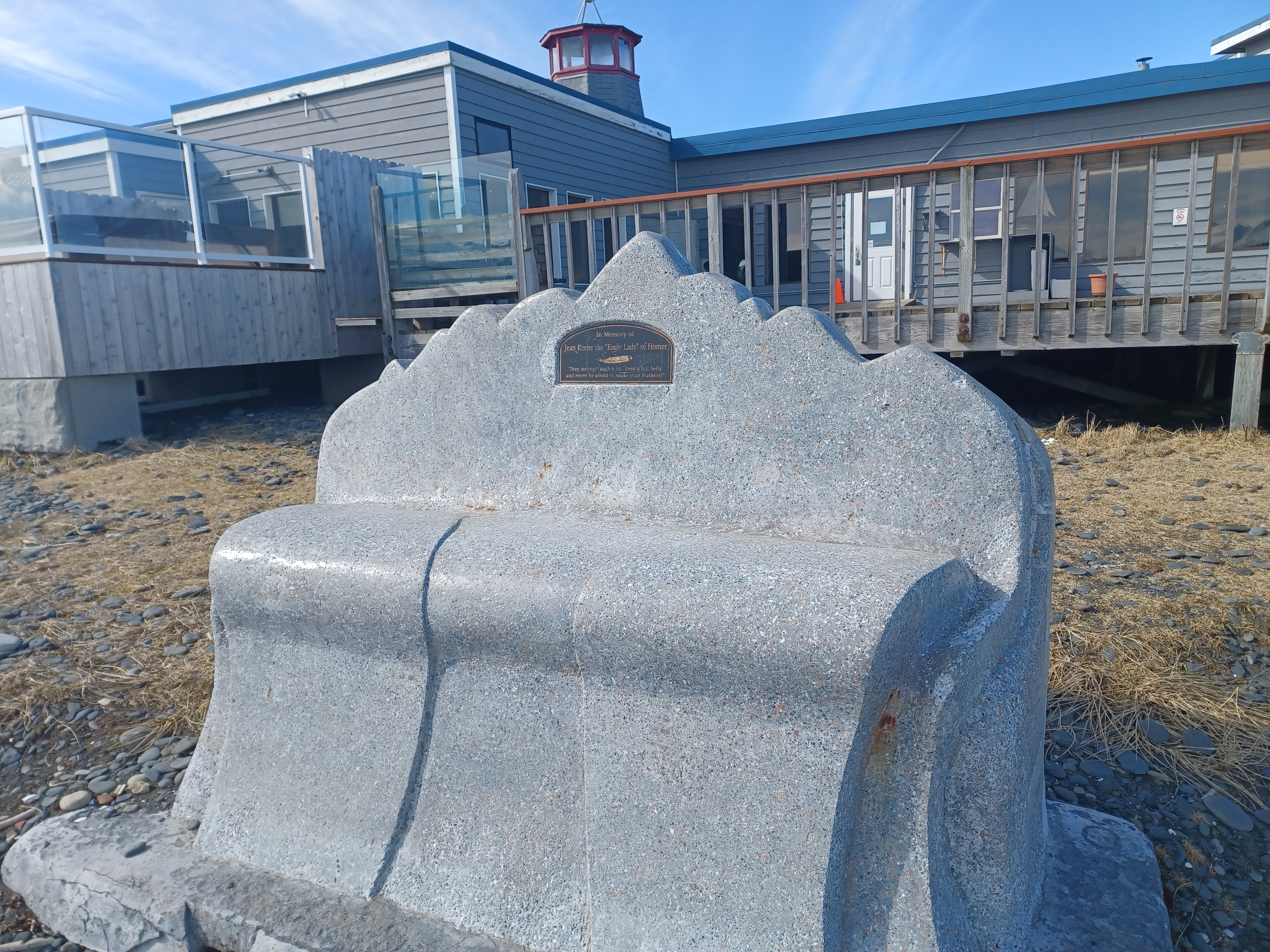
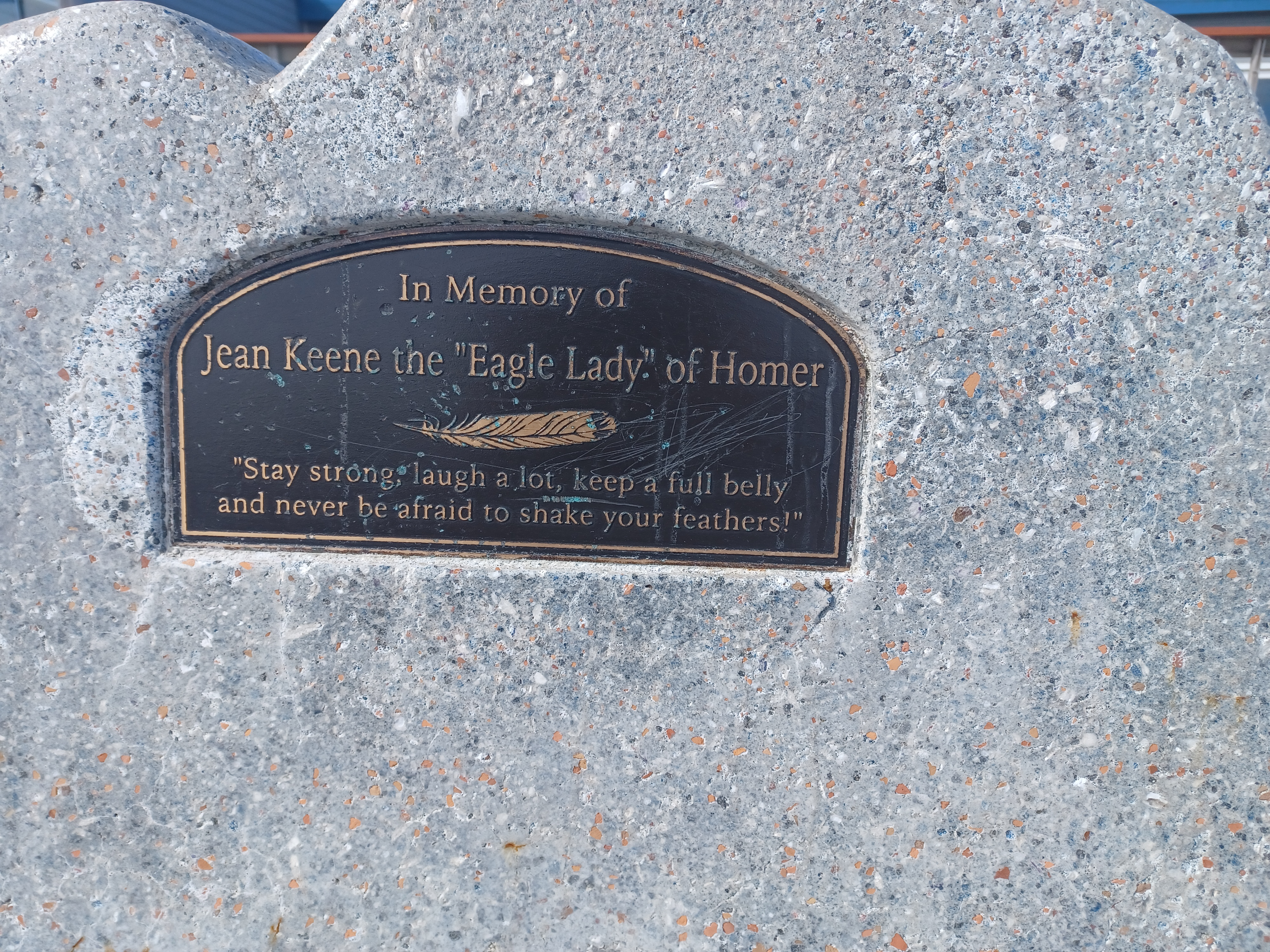
Memorial bench on the beach at Coal Point, the very end of the Homer Spit

Keene died at home on January 13, 2009, aged 85, from a respiratory condition. After her death, the Homer city council passed a new resolution banning the feeding of eagles, crows, ravens and other predatory and scavenger birds by any person, effective March 19, 2009. The resolution's effective date was delayed until spring out of concern that the birds would either die of starvation or become highly aggressive if the feeding ended in the middle of winter.
