= Aitkin Carnegie Library =

- U.S. National Register of Historic Places
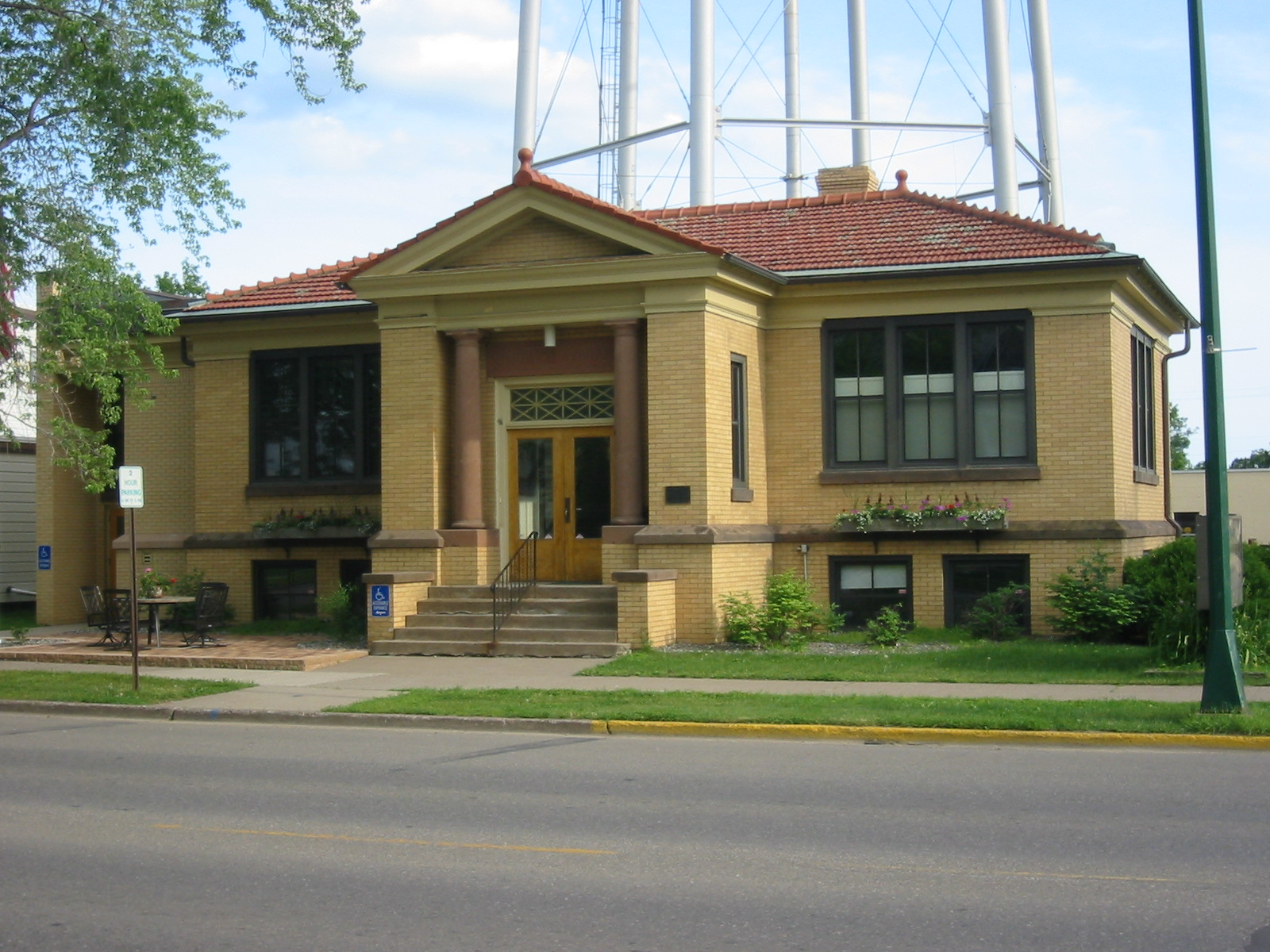

- Location within Minnesota Location within the United States
- Location: 121 2nd St., NW; Aitkin, Minnesota
- Coordinates: 46°31′59.57″N 93°42′32.81″W
- Built: 1911
- Architect: Claude & Starck
- Architectural style: Classical Revival
- MPS: Aitkin County MRA
- NRHP reference No.: 82002924
- Added to NRHP: April 16, 1982

The Aitkin Carnegie Library is a Carnegie library in Aitkin, Minnesota, United States. It was designed by architects Claude & Starck and was built in the Classical Revival style. It was listed on the National Register of Historic Places in 1982.

It is a one-story buff-colored brick building upon an elevated basement and a concrete foundation. It has a central classical pedimented portico.

In 1981 it was deemed "significant both for its role in the intellectual and cultural development of Aitkin and as a well-preserved example of the Minnesota small-town library structures financed by Andrew Carnegie, noted turn-of-the-century steel magnate. Aitkin citizens organized a free public library in 1904. The library collection was temporarily housed in the village council chamber until the present structure's construction in 1911 with a $6,500 grant from the Carnegie Foundation. The library, unlike many Carnegie-funded libraries which have been demolished or altered as community library systems have expanded, retains its original design integrity while continuing to serve the community in its intended educational role. Architecturally, the library is a notable local example of public Neo-classical design."

In 1982 it was placed on the National Register of Historic Places and the building currently serves as the Jaques Art Center. In 1995 the building was purchased for $1 by area citizens wanting a home for the preservation and exhibition of the work of Aitkin County artist, Francis Lee Jaques. The building was renovated in 2004 adding an elevator, the Jaques Gallery, and a classroom. Tremendous care was taken during the renovation to preserve the historical integrity of the structure, however the maintenance of this structure is costly and the Jaques Art Center has been in search of funding for maintenance and repairs. The nonprofit Jaques Art Center is home to the largest collection of Francis Lee Jaques art outside of the Bell Museum and hosts new art exhibits approximately every 8 weeks. In keeping with the original Carnegie Library tradition, the gift shop also has an extensive book collection.
