= David E. Rued =

American politician, farmer and educator (1932–2023)

David Evan Rued (May 17, 1932 – June 3, 2023) was an American politician, farmer and educator.

== Life and career ==
Born May 17, 1932, Rued lived in Aitkin, Minnesota with his wife and family. He went to Big Lake High School in Big Lake, Minnesota and to St. Cloud State University. Rued served in the United States Air Force during the Korean War. He graduated from the University of Minnesota in 1959 and went to graduate school concerning agricultural education at University of Minnesota. He was a farmer and an agricultural vocational teacher. Reu= served on the Aitken, Minnesota School Board and was involved with the Aitkin County Agricultural Society. Rued served in the Minnesota Senate from 1978 to 1982 and was a Republican.

Rued died in Aitkin on June 3, 2023, at the age of 91.
