= Aitkin Municipal Airport =

Aitkin Municipal Airport Steve Kurtz Field
- IATA: none; ICAO: KAIT; FAA LID: AIT

Summary
- Airport type: Public
- Owner: County & City of Aitkin
- Serves: Aitkin, Minnesota
- Elevation AMSL: 1,205 ft (367 m)
- Coordinates: 46°32′54″N 093°40′36″W

Map
- Location of airport in Minnesota/United States AIT (the United States)

Runways
Direction	Length		Surface
Direction	ft	m	Surface
16/34	4,018	1,225	Asphalt
8/26	3,335	1,017	Turf

Statistics (2007)
- Aircraft operations: 16,000
- Based aircraft: 47
- Source: Federal Aviation Administration

Aitkin Municipal Airport (ICAO: KAIT, FAA LID: AIT), also known as Steve Kurtz Field, is a public use airport located two nautical miles (4 km) northeast of the central business district of Aitkin, a city in Aitkin County, Minnesota, United States. It is owned by the County & City of Aitkin.

Although most U.S. airports use the same three-letter location identifier for the FAA and IATA, this airport is assigned AIT by the FAA but has no designation from the IATA (which assigned AIT to Aitutaki, Cook Islands).

Aitkin County and the city opened the airport in the early 1950s with a single grass runway. The runway was paved and lighted in 1975.

The airport is named after the owner and founder of Steve's Flight Service, Steve Kurtz.

== Facilities and aircraft ==
Aitkin Municipal Airport covers an area of 299 acres (121 ha) at an elevation of 1,205 feet (367 m) above mean sea level. It has two runways: 16/34 with a 4,018 x 75 ft (1,225 x 23 m) asphalt pavement and 8/26 with a 3,335 x 150 ft (1,017 x 46 m) turf surface.

For the 12-month period ending June 30, 2007, the airport had 16,000 general aviation aircraft operations, an average of 43 per day. At that time there were 47 aircraft based at this airport: 94% single-engine, 4% multi-engine and 2% glider.

== See also ==
- List of airports in Minnesota
