= Homer Spit =

Landform in Homer, Alaska

Coordinates: 59°37′12″N 151°27′17″W

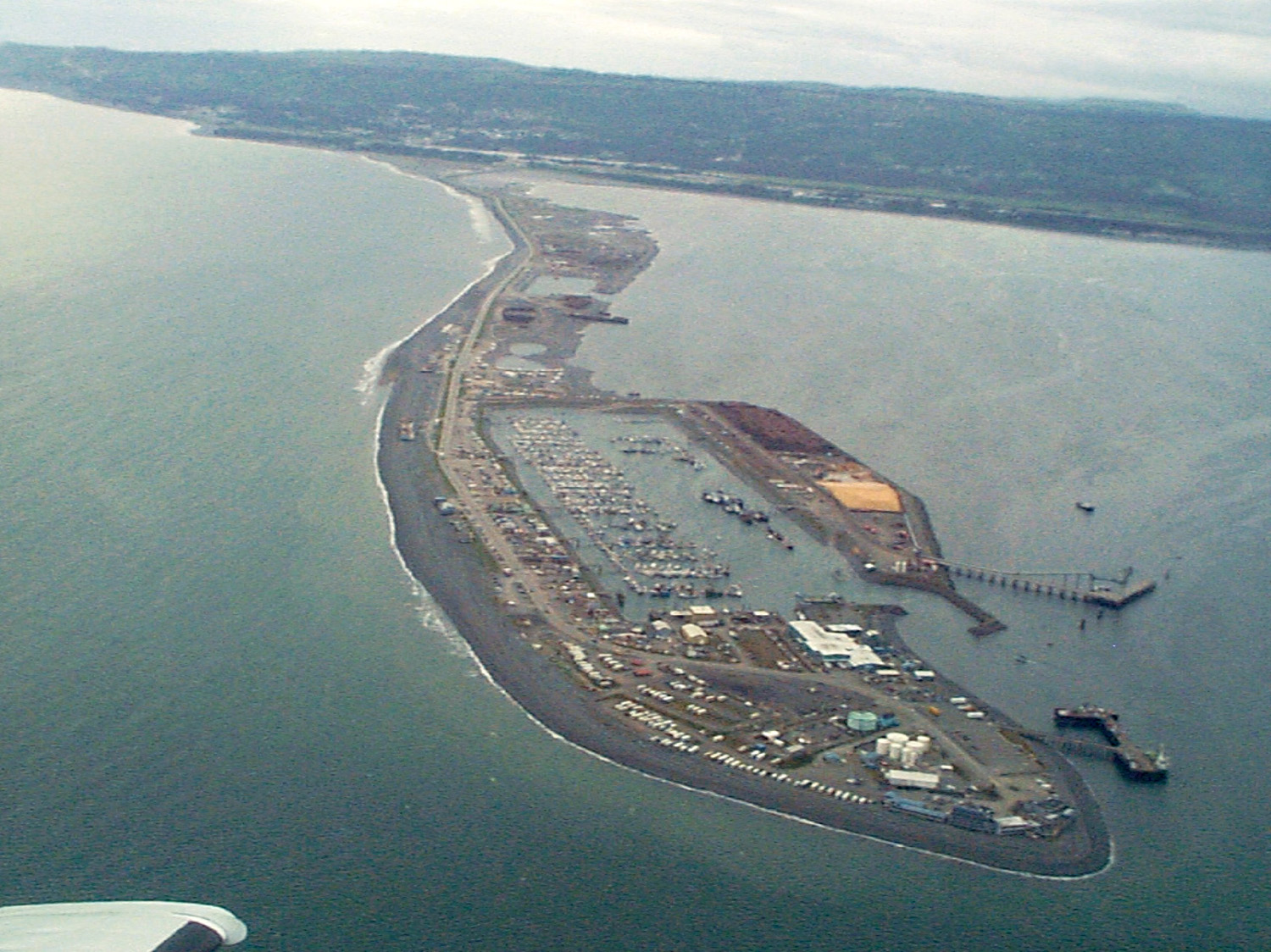
Homer Spit, Homer, Alaska

The Homer Spit (Dena'ina: Uzintun) is a geographical landmark located in Homer, Alaska, on the southern tip of the Kenai Peninsula. The spit is a 4.5-mile (7.2 km) long piece of land jutting out into Kachemak Bay. The spit is also home to the Homer Boat Harbor. The harbor contains both deep and shallow water docks and serves up to 1500 commercial and pleasure boats at its summer peak. Additional features and attractions include The Nick Dudiak Fishing Lagoon, which is an artificial "fishing hole", campgrounds, hotels, and restaurants, and the Salty Dawg Saloon, which is constructed out of several historic buildings from Homer. Hundreds of eagles formerly gathered there in winter to be fed by Jean Keene, the "Eagle Lady".

== History ==
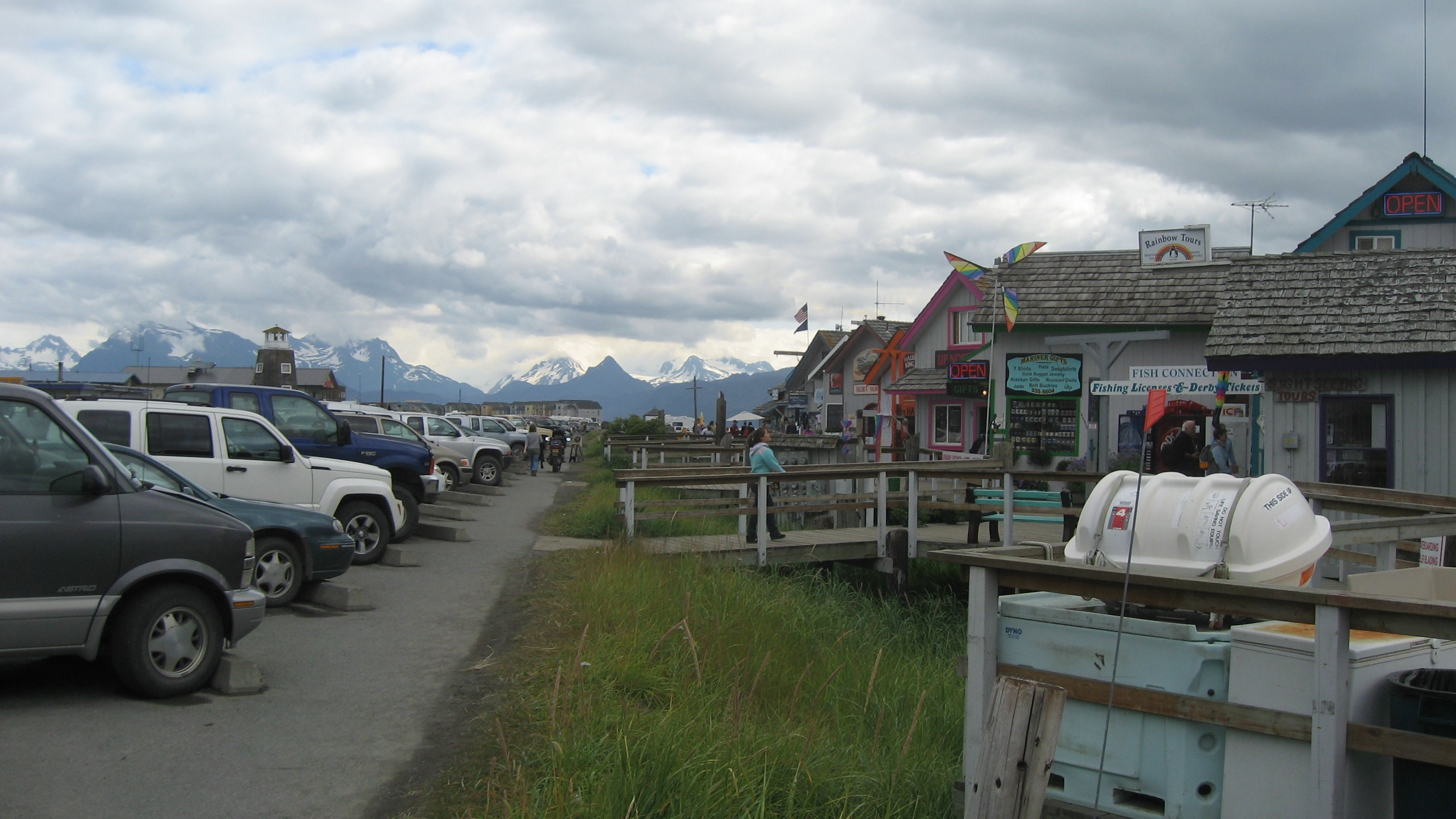
Businesses on the spit are mostly on boardwalks

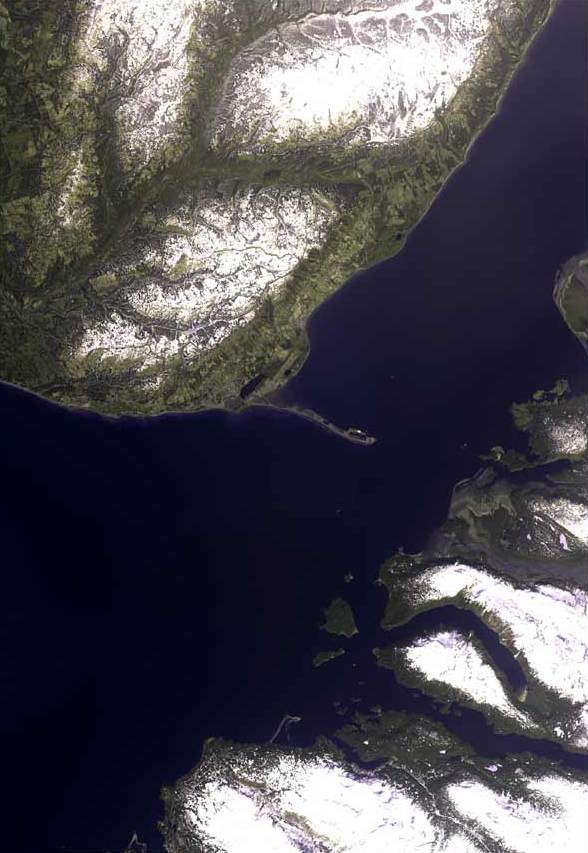
The spit from space

Two different theories postulate that the spit originates either from the tidal swells and currents of Cook Inlet and Kachemak Bay over millennia of sand buildup, or that it was pushed into place by now-retreated glaciers. The Dena'ina called the spit Uzintun, meaning "extends out into the distance". In 1899, the Cook Inlet Coal Fields Company laid a railroad track along the spit, connecting the docks to the coal fields along Kachemak Bay. The resulting business led to the development of what eventually became Homer, Alaska. In the 1960s, several hippies, known as "spit rats", traveled from all around to camp on the Homer Spit, many of them becoming successful commercial fishermen over time. The 1964 Alaska earthquake shrank it to 508 acres (2.06 km^{2}), and killed most of the vegetation, making it today mostly gravel and sand.

== Nick Dudiak Fishing Lagoon ==
This artificial lagoon is known locally as the "fishing hole". Every spring it is stocked with salmon fry from the Trail Lakes hatchery facility. The fry are fed by volunteers so that they will imprint on the location in the normal manner of salmon. They then proceed to live normal lives as wild salmon, returning as adults to the lagoon due to their instinctual desire to mate and spawn. The lagoon is a popular attraction for both tourists and locals, as it is an easily accessible and inexpensive salmon fishery. There is even a ramp for those who have to use wheelchairs. During the summer months it can become very crowded if there is an active salmon run occurring, and there is additional competition from harbor seals who often enter the lagoon to chase salmon. The official name is a tribute to the biologist from the Alaska Department of Fish and Game who proposed the idea and managed the project.

== Potential threats ==
Because the spit sits only about 19 feet (5.8 m) above sea level, it is susceptible to threats such as storm surge, tsunamis, including ones that could be caused by eruptions of several nearby volcanoes, and climate change, as well as erosion; the ocean side is exposed to heavy waves.

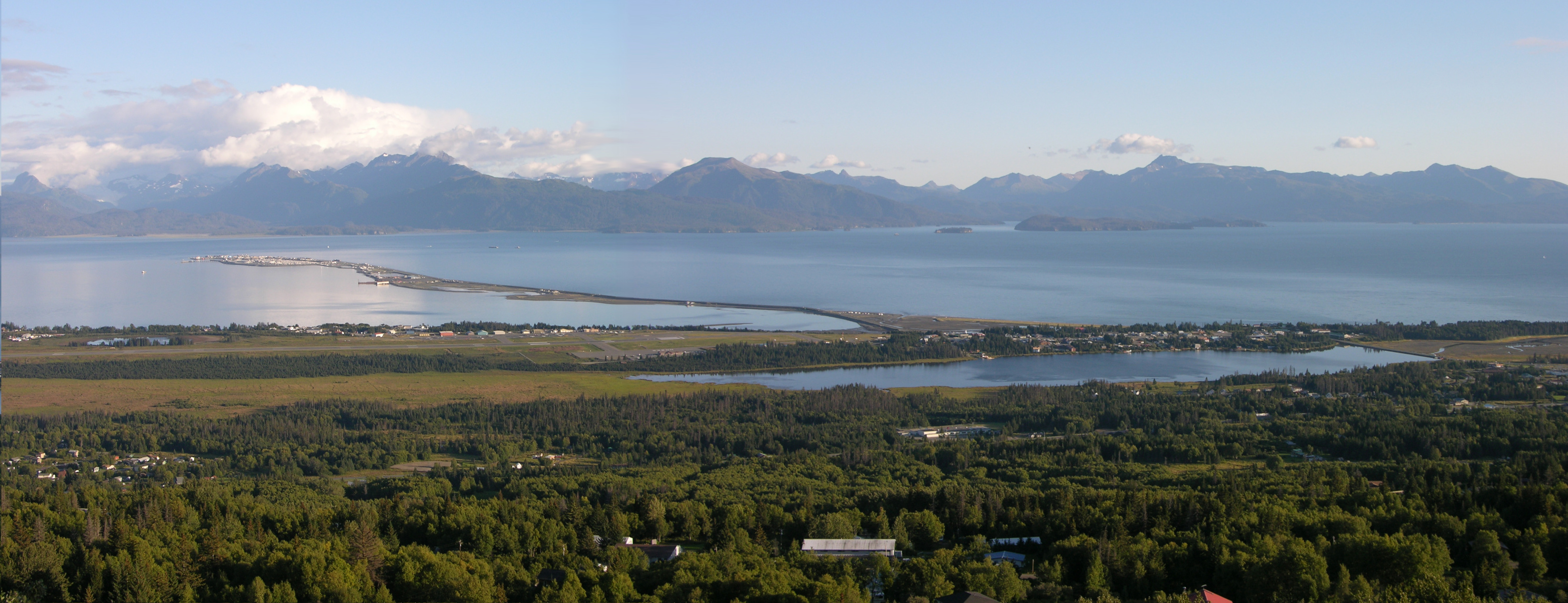
Homer Spit
