= Aitkin County Courthouse and Jail =

- U.S. National Register of Historic Places
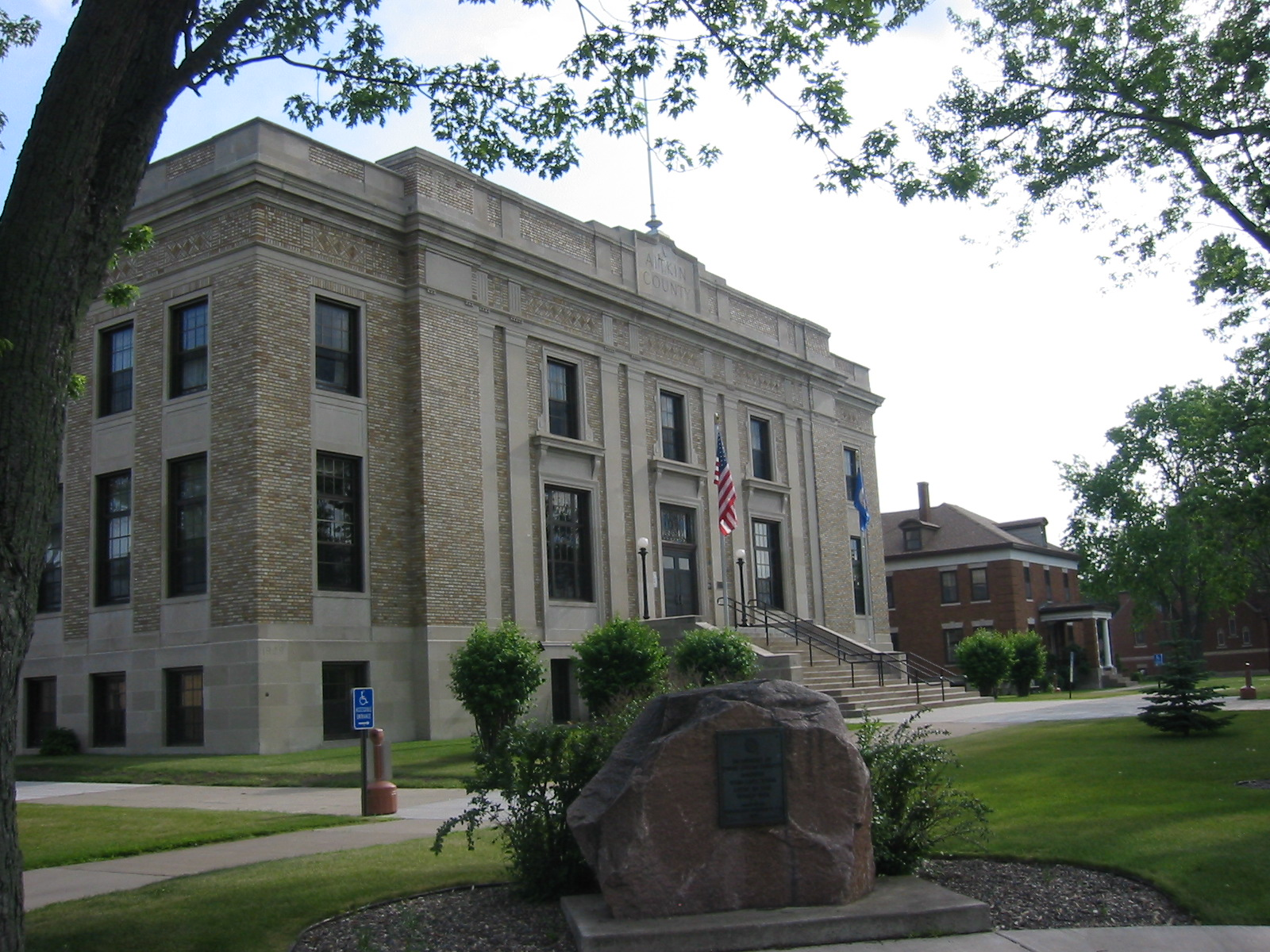
- Aitkin County Courthouse.

- Location within Minnesota Location within the United States
- Interactive map showing the location of Aitkin County Courthouse
- Location: 209 and 217 2nd St., NW; Aitkin, Minnesota
- Coordinates: 46°31′58.9″N 93°42′37.02″W
- Built: 1929
- Architect: E.C. Pell; Toltz, King & Day
- Architectural style: Beaux-Arts
- MPS: Aitkin County MRA
- NRHP reference No.: 82002923
- Added to NRHP: April 16, 1982

The Aitkin County Courthouse and Jail, in Aitkin, Minnesota, United States, serves as the county seat of Aitkin County. The building is actually the second courthouse for the county. The first courthouse was built in 1888, but in 1920, a grand jury reported that the building was dangerous and "falling apart". After difficulties securing financing, the county commissioners approved a plan for a new courthouse, which was finished in 1929. The design mixes Beaux-Arts architecture and Moderne elements. The interior features marble wainscoting, oak woodwork, terrazzo floors, and stained glass skylights.
